= RMS Lusitania =

British ocean liner (1907–1915)

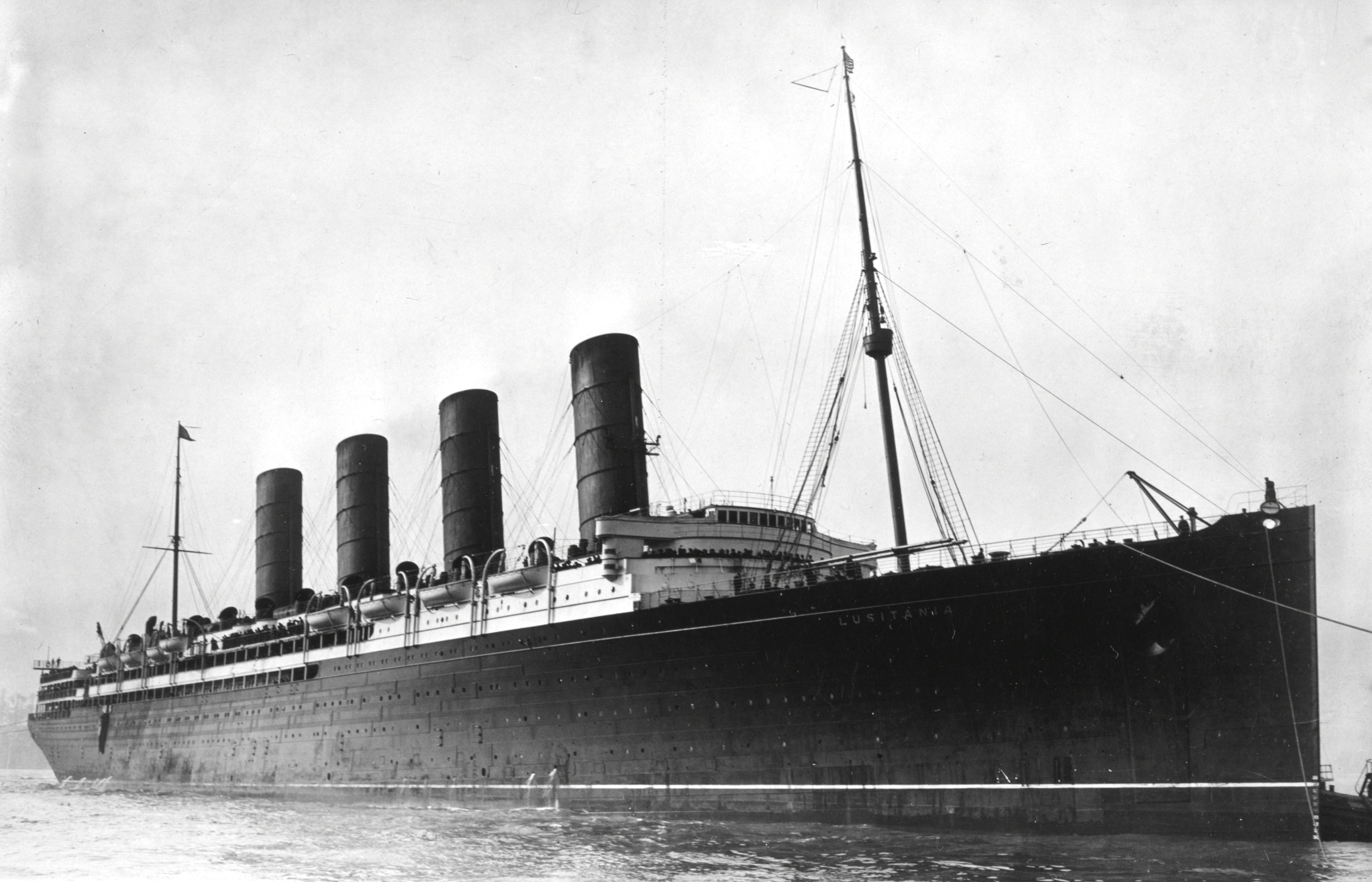
- RMS Lusitania arriving in New York City in 1907

History

United Kingdom
- Name: RMS Lusitania
- Namesake: Lusitania
- Owner: Cunard Line
- Port of registry: Liverpool, UK
- Route: Liverpool – Queenstown – New York
- Builder: John Brown & Co, Clydebank
- Yard number: 367
- Laid down: 17 August 1904
- Launched: 7 June 1906
- Christened: Mary, Lady Inverclyde
- Acquired: 26 August 1907
- Maiden voyage: 7 September 1907
- In service: 1907 – 1915
- Out of service: 7 May 1915
- Identification: UK official number 124082; code letters HLJW; by 1913: wireless call sign MFA
- Fate: Torpedoed and sunk on 7 May 1915

General characteristics
- Type: Ocean liner
- Tonnage: 31,550 GRT, 12,611 NRT
- Displacement: 44,060 long tons (44,767.0 t)
- Length: 787 ft (239.9 m) overall (Note: The ship's overall length is often misquoted at either 785 or 790 feet.); 762.2 ft (232.3 m) registered
- Beam: 87.8 ft (26.8 m)
- Height: 65 ft (19.8 m) to boat deck, 165 ft (50.3 m) to aerials, 104 ft (31.7 m) from keel to top of boat deck, 144 ft (43.9 m) from keel to top of funnels
- Draught: 33.6 ft (10.2 m)
- Depth: 56.6 ft (17.3 m)
- Decks: 6 passenger decks, 10 overall
- Installed power: 25 fire-tube boilers; four direct-acting Parsons steam turbines producing 76,000 hp (57 MW)
- Propulsion: as built: four triple blade propellers; from 1909: quadruple blade propellers
- Speed: 26 knots (48 km/h; 30 mph)
- Capacity: 552 first class, 460 second class, 1,186 third class; 2,198 total.
- Crew: 850
- Notes: First British four-funnelled ocean liner

RMS Lusitania was a British ocean liner launched by the Cunard Line in 1906 as a Royal Mail Ship. She was the world's largest passenger ship until the completion of the Mauretania three months later. In 1907, she gained the Blue Riband appellation for the fastest Atlantic crossing, which had been held by German ships for a decade.

Though reserved for conversion as an armed merchant cruiser, Lusitania was not commissioned as such during World War I, but continued a transatlantic passenger service, sometimes carrying war materials in her cargo. The German submarine U-20 hit her with a torpedo on 7 May 1915 at 14:10, 11 nautical miles (20 km; 13 mi) off the Old Head of Kinsale, Ireland, leading to her sinking about 18 minutes later. Only six of several dozen lifeboats and rafts were successfully lowered; there were 763 survivors out of the 1,960 people on board, while 1,197 perished.

The sinking killed 128 US citizens and significantly increased American public support for entering the war, which occurred in 1917 with the United States declaration of war on Germany, after three other US merchant ships had been torpedoed.

== Overview ==
German shipping lines were Cunard's main competitors for the custom of transatlantic passengers in the early 20th century, and Cunard responded by building two new 'ocean greyhounds': Lusitania and RMS Mauretania. Cunard used assistance from the British Admiralty to build both new ships, on the understanding that the ship would be available for military duty in times of war. During construction gun mounts for deck cannons were installed but no guns were ever fitted. Both Lusitania and Mauretania were powered by steam turbines which enabled them to maintain a service speed of 24 knots (44 km/h; 28 mph). They were equipped with lifts, wireless telegraphy, and electric lights, and provided 50 percent more passenger space than any other ship; the first-class decks were known for their sumptuous furnishings.

A series of tit-for-tat moves intensified the naval portion of World War I. The Royal Navy had blockaded the German Empire at the start of the war; as a reprisal to German naval mining efforts, the United Kingdom then declared the North Sea a military area in the autumn of 1914 and mined the approaches. As their own reprisal, Germany had declared the seas around the United Kingdom a war zone, wherein all Allied ships would be liable to be sunk without warning. Britain then declared all food imports for Germany were contraband. When submarines failed to sink many ships, the German authorities loosened U-boat rules of engagement. The German embassy in the United States also placed fifty newspaper advertisements warning people of the dangers of sailing on a British ship in the area, which happened to appear just as RMS Lusitania left New York for Britain on 1 May 1915. Objections were made by the British and Americans that threatening to torpedo all ships indiscriminately was wrong, whether it was announced in advance or not.

On the afternoon of 7 May, a German U-boat torpedoed Lusitania 11 nautical miles (20 km; 13 mi) off the southern coast of Ireland inside the declared war zone. A second internal explosion occurred. The damage caused her to sink in 18 minutes, killing 1,197 passengers and crew. Hundreds of bodies washed ashore, but most were never found.

The German government attempted to find justifications for sinking Lusitania. Special justifications focused on the small declared cargo of 173 tons of war materials on board the 44,000-ton displacement ship, and false claims that she was an armed warship and carried Canadian troops. In defence of indiscriminately sinking ships without warning, they asserted that cruiser rules were obsolete, as British merchant ships could be armed and had been instructed to evade or ram U-boats if the opportunity arose, and that the general warning given to all ships in the war zone was sufficient.

After the First World War, successive British governments maintained that there were no "munitions", apart from small arms ammunition on board Lusitania, and the Germans were not justified in treating the ship as a naval vessel. But the most important protests at the time came from the US. Under neutrality inspections, the US was aware the ship was not armed, was acting in accordance with American law, and was chiefly a passenger vessel carrying almost two thousand civilian passengers and crew, including over a hundred American citizens among the dead. The US government argued that whatever the circumstances, nothing could justify the killing of large numbers of un-resisting civilians, and that the United States had a responsibility to protect the lives of law-abiding Americans. The Americans had already warned the Germans repeatedly about their actions, and the Germans had also demonstrated that submarines were able to sink merchant ships under cruiser rules.

The sinking shifted public and leadership opinion in the United States against Germany. US and internal German pressure led to a suspension of German Admiralty policy of deliberately targeting passenger ships, as well as later stronger restrictions. War was eventually declared in 1917 after the German government chose to violate these restrictions, deliberately attacking American shipping and preparing the way for conflict with the Zimmermann Telegram.

== Development and construction ==
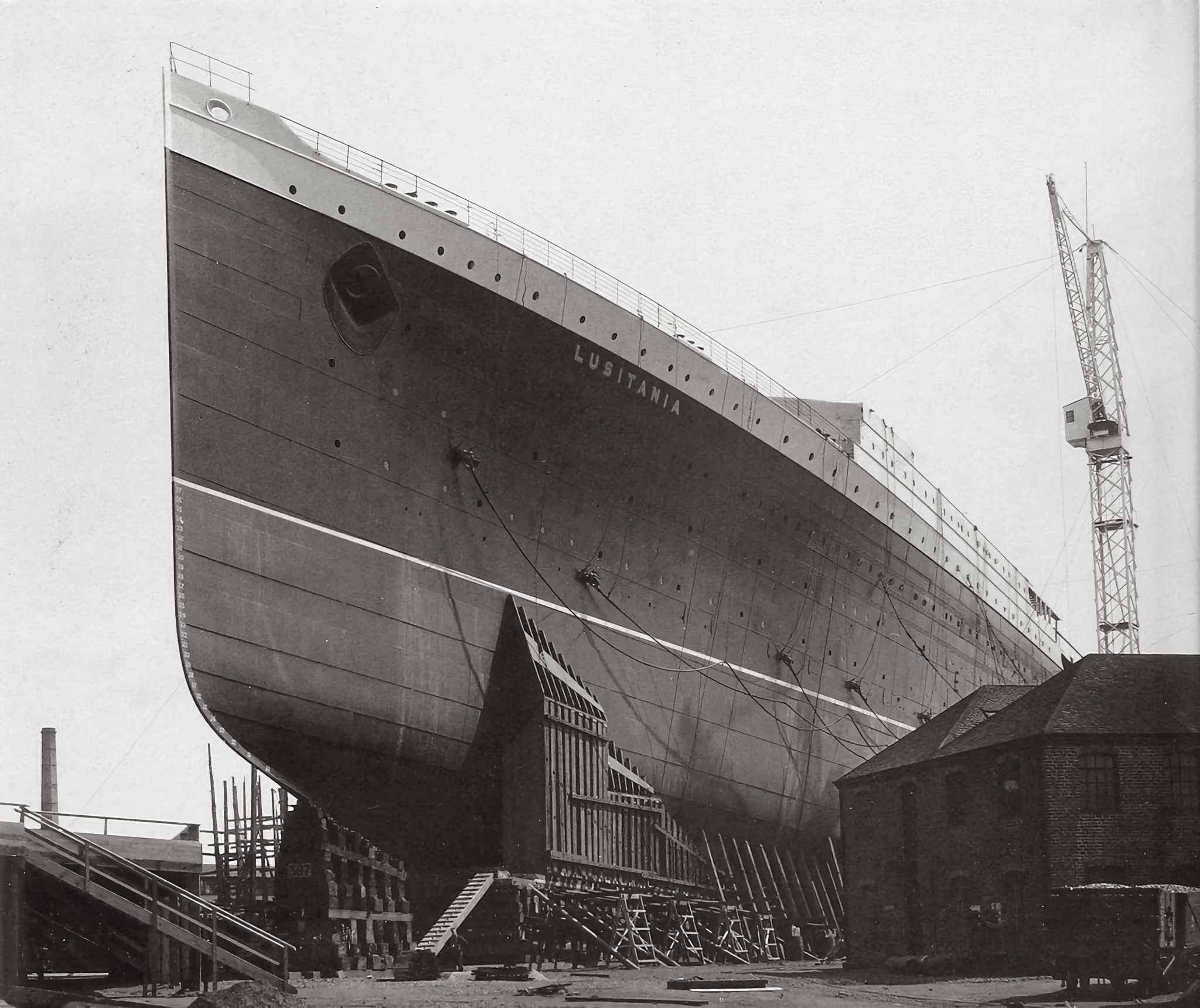
Lusitania, prior to her launch

Lusitania and Mauretania were commissioned by Cunard, responding to increasing competition from rival transatlantic passenger companies, particularly the German Norddeutscher Lloyd (NDL) and Hamburg America Line (HAPAG). They had larger, faster, more modern, and more luxurious ships than Cunard, and they were better placed to capture the lucrative trade in emigrants leaving Europe for North America. The NDL liner Kaiser Wilhelm der Grosse captured the Blue Riband from Cunard's Campania in 1897, before the prize was taken in 1900 by the HAPAG ship Deutschland. NDL regained the prize in 1903 with the Kaiser Wilhelm II and Kronprinz Wilhelm, and Cunard saw its passenger numbers affected as a result of the "Kaiser-class ocean liners".

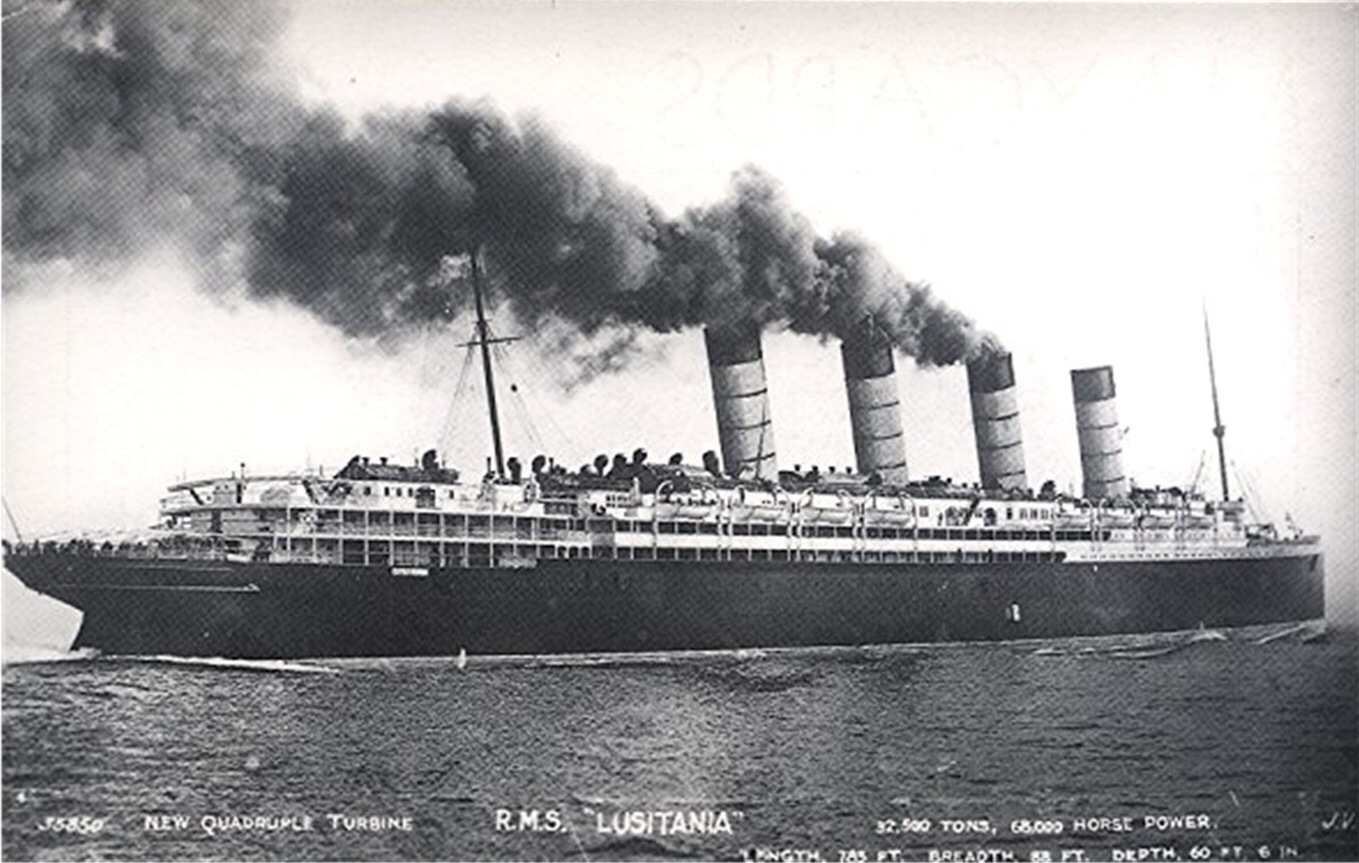
RMS Lusitania – built 1904–1906

American businessman J. P. Morgan had decided to invest in transatlantic shipping by creating International Mercantile Marine (IMM). He purchased the British freight shipper Frederick Leyland & Co. in 1901, as well as a controlling interest in the British passenger White Star Line, and folded them into IMM. In 1902, IMM, NDL, and HAPAG entered into a "Community of Interest" to fix prices and divide the transatlantic trade. The partners also acquired a 51-percent stake in the Dutch Holland America Line. IMM made offers to purchase Cunard which was now its principal rival, along with the French Compagnie Générale Transatlantique (CGT).

Cunard chairman Lord Inverclyde approached the British government for assistance. The government was faced with the impending collapse of the British liner fleet and the consequent loss of national prestige, as well as the reserve of shipping for war purposes which it represented, and they agreed to help. Under the terms of an agreement signed in June 1903, Cunard was given a loan of £2.6 million to finance two ships, repayable over 20 years at a favourable interest rate of 2.75-percent. The ships would receive an annual operating subsidy of £75,000 each plus a mail contract worth £68,000. In return, the ships would be built to Admiralty specifications so that they could be used as auxiliary cruisers in wartime. Lusitania and her sister ship received special permission to fly the Blue Ensign, as a Royal Naval Reserve Merchant Vessel.

=== Design ===
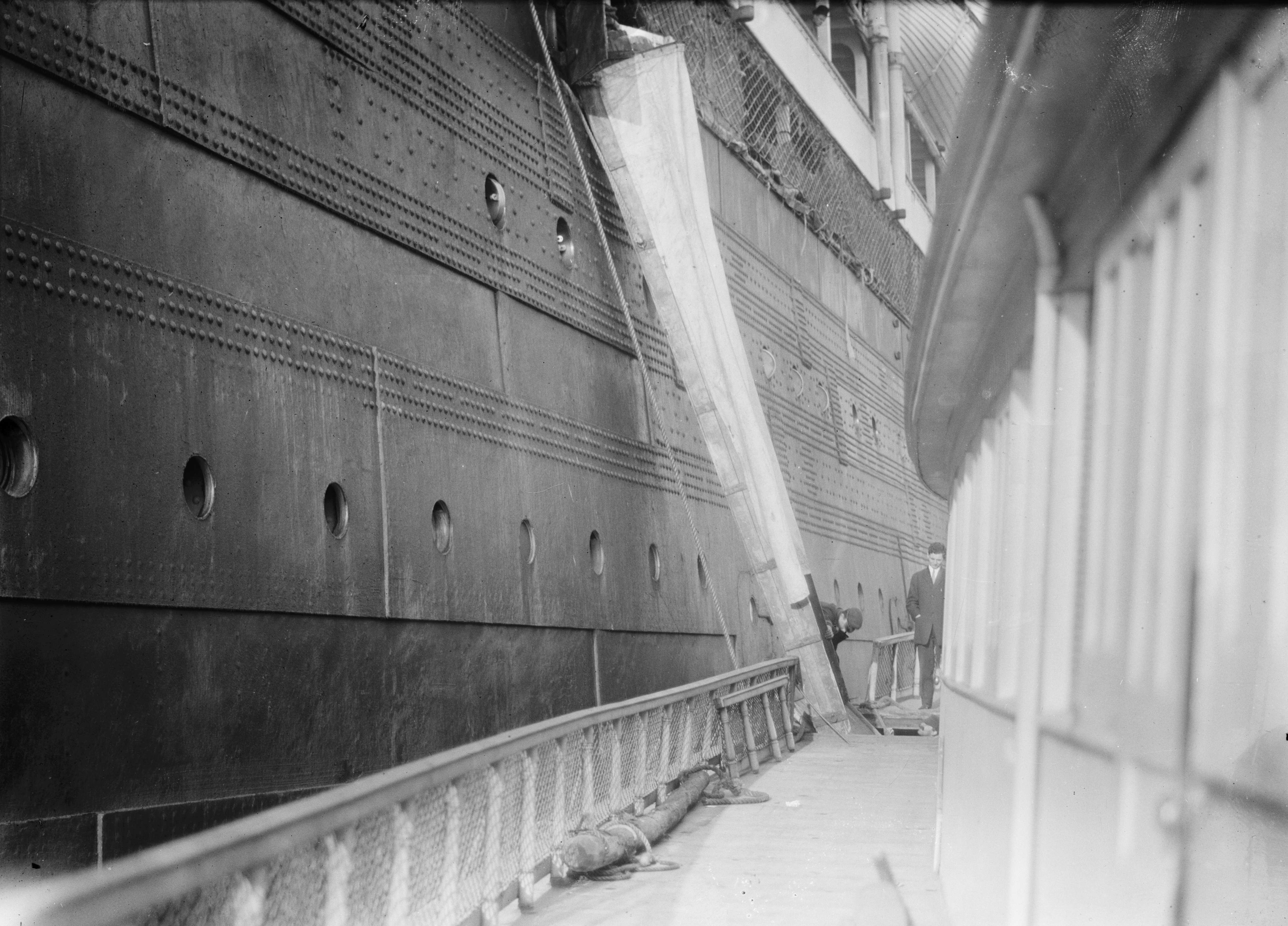
Lusitania unloading Christmas mail to a post office boat

Cunard established a committee to decide upon the design for the new ships, of which James Bain, Cunard's Marine Superintendent was the chairman. Other members included Rear Admiral H. J. Oram, who had been involved in designs for steam turbine-powered ships for the Royal Navy, and Charles Parsons, whose company Parsons Marine was now producing turbine engines.

Parsons maintained that he could design engines capable of maintaining a speed of 25 knots (46 km/h; 29 mph), which would require 68,000 shaft horsepower (68,000 hp; 51,000 kW). The largest turbine sets built so far had been of 23,000 shp (23,000 hp; 17,000 kW) for the battleship Dreadnought, and 41,000 shp (41,000 hp; 31,000 kW) for Invincible-class battlecruisers, which meant the engines would be of a new, untested design. Turbines offered the advantages of generating less vibration than the reciprocating engines and greater reliability in operation at high speeds, combined with lower fuel consumption. Having initially turned down the use of this relatively untried type of engine, Cunard was persuaded by the Admiralty to set up a committee of marine professionals to look at its possible use on the new liners. The relative merits of turbines and reciprocating engines were investigated in a series of trials between Newhaven and Dieppe using the turbine-driven cross-Channel ferry Brighton and the similarly-designed Arundel, which had reciprocating engines. The Turbine Committee was convinced by these and other tests that turbines were the way forward and recommended on 24 March 1904 that they should be used on the new express liners. In order to gain some experience of these new engines, Cunard asked John Brown to fit turbines on Carmania, the second of a pair of 19,500 GRT intermediate liners under construction at the yard. Carmania was completed in 1905 and this gave Cunard almost two years of experience before the introduction of their new super liners in 1907.

The ship was designed by Leonard Peskett and built by John Brown and Company of Clydebank, Scotland. The ship's name was taken from Lusitania, an ancient Roman province on the west of the Iberian Peninsula—the region that is now southern Portugal and Extremadura (Spain). Her sister ship, Mauretania, was named for the ancient land on the nearby northwest African coast. The name Lusitania had also been used by a previous ship built in 1871 and wrecked in 1901, making the name available from Lloyd's for Cunard's giant.

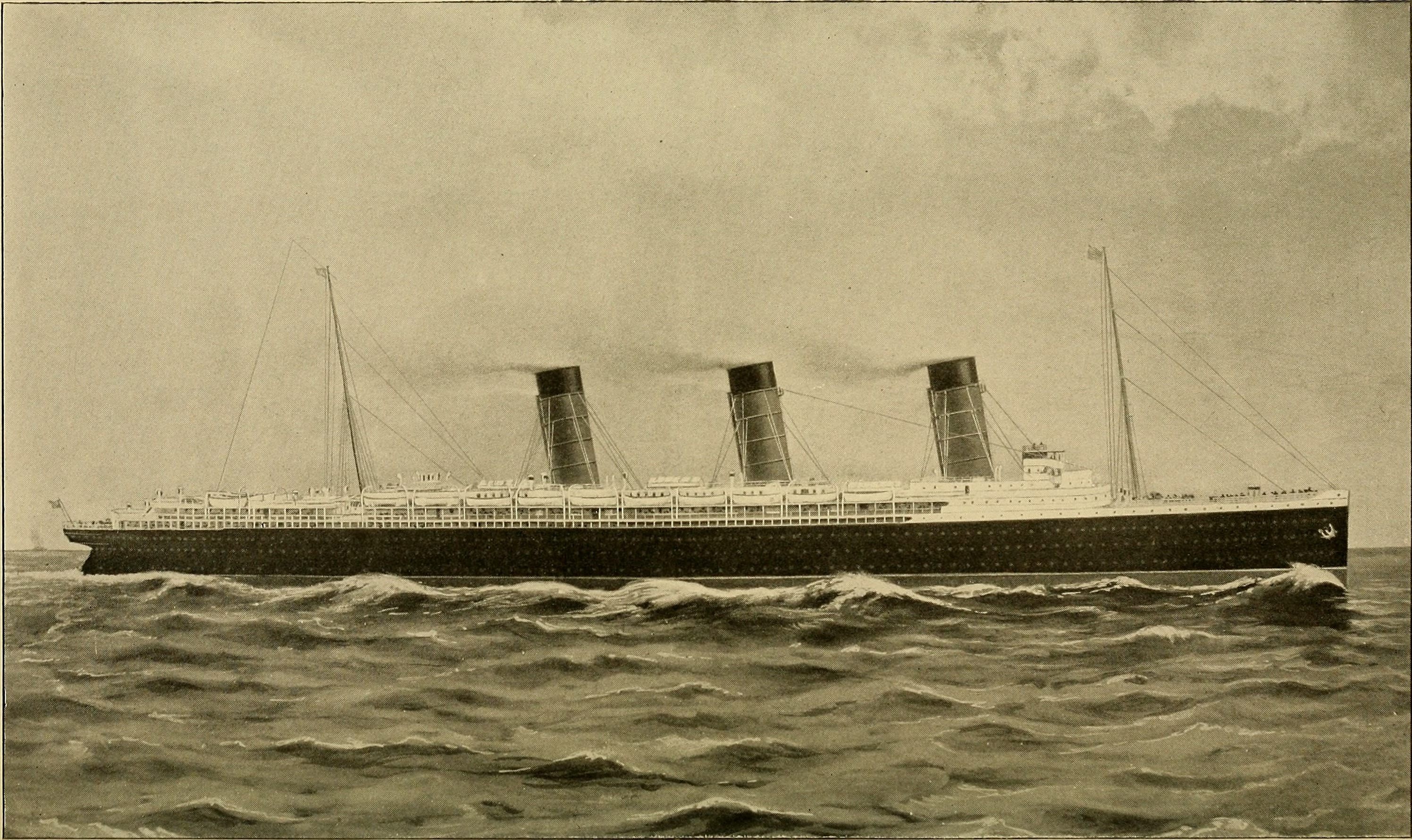
Early concept art of Lusitania with three funnels

Peskett had built a large model of the proposed ship in 1902 showing a three-funnel design. A fourth funnel was implemented into the design in 1904 as it was necessary to vent the exhaust from additional boilers fitted after steam turbines had been settled on as the power plant. The original plan called for three propellers, but this was altered to four because it was felt the necessary power could not be transmitted through just three. Four turbines would drive four separate propellers, with additional reversing turbines to drive the two inboard shafts only. To improve efficiency, the two inboard propellers rotated inward, while those outboard rotated outward. The outboard turbines operated at high pressure; the exhaust steam then passing to those inboard at relatively low pressure.

The propellers were driven directly by the turbines, for sufficiently robust gearboxes had not yet been developed, and only became available in 1916. Instead, the turbines had to be designed to run at a much lower speed than those normally accepted as being optimum. Thus, the efficiency of the turbines installed was less at low speeds than a conventional reciprocating steam engine, but considerably superior when the engines were run at high speed, as was usually the case for an express liner. The ship was fitted with 23 double-ended and two single-ended boilers (which fitted the forward space where the ship narrowed), operating at a maximum 195 pounds per square inch (1,340 kPa) and containing 192 individual furnaces.

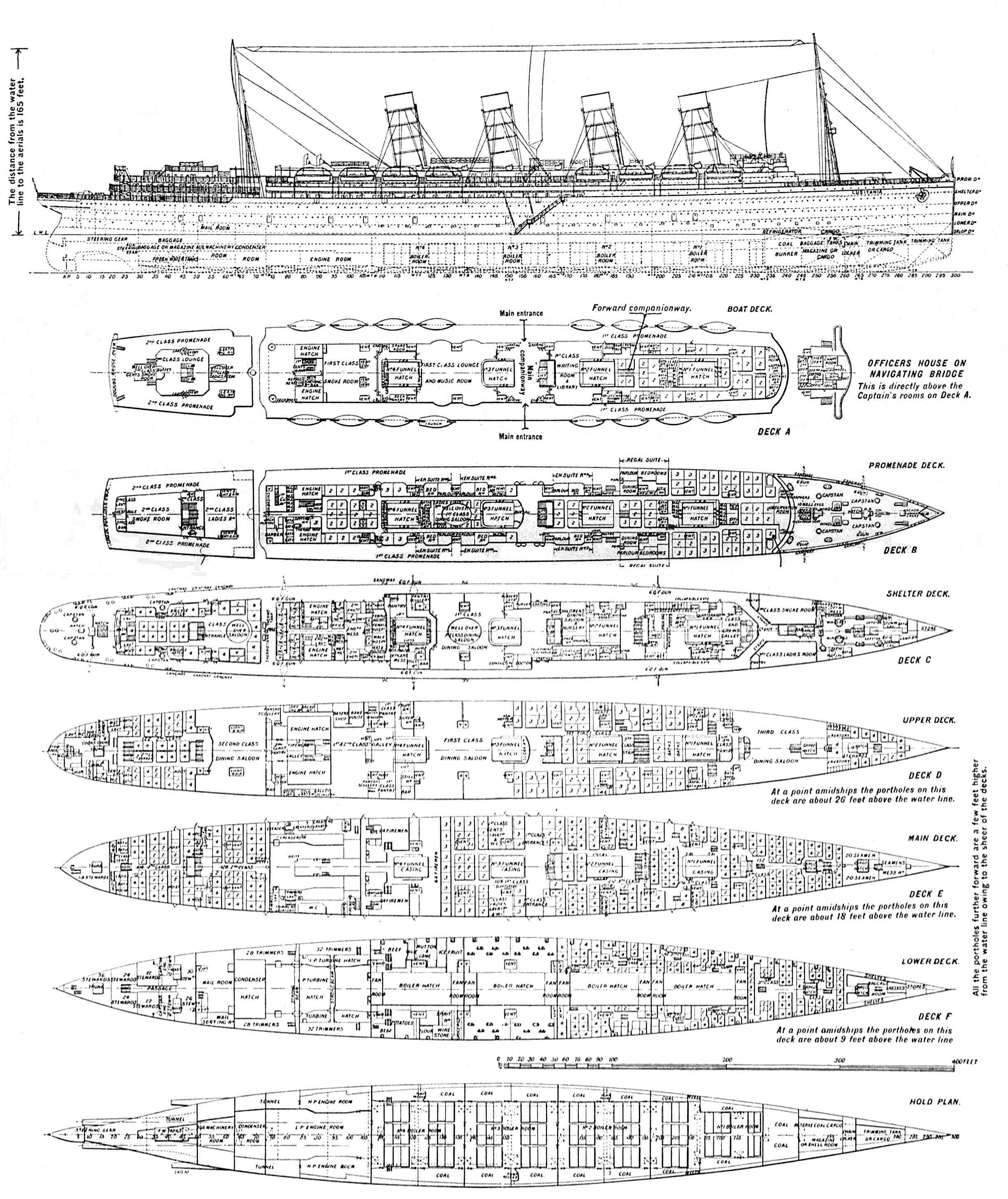
Deck plans of Lusitania. Modifications were made both during and after the ship's construction. By 1915 the lifeboat arrangement had been changed to 11 fixed boats on either side, plus collapsible boats stored under each lifeboat and on the poop deck.

Work to refine the hull shape was conducted in the Admiralty experimental tank at Haslar, Gosport. As a result of experiments, the beam of the ship was increased by 10 ft (3.0 m) over that initially intended to improve stability. The hull immediately in front of the rudder and the balanced rudder itself followed naval design practice to improve the vessel's turning response. The Admiralty contract required that all machinery be below the waterline, where it was considered to be better protected from gunfire, and the aft third of the ship below water was used to house the turbines, the steering motors and four 503-shaft-horsepower (503 hp; 375 kW) steam-driven turbo-generators. The central half contained four boiler rooms, with the remaining space at the forward end of the ship being reserved for cargo and other storage.

Coal bunkers were placed along the length of the ship outboard of the boiler rooms, with a large transverse bunker immediately in front of that most forward (number 1) boiler room. Apart from convenience ready for use, the coal was considered to provide added protection for the central spaces against attack. At the very front were the chain lockers for the anchor chains and ballast tanks to adjust the ship's trim.

The hull space was divided into 13 watertight compartments, any two of which could be flooded without risk of the ship sinking, connected by 35 hydraulically operated watertight doors. A critical flaw in the arrangement of the watertight compartments was that sliding doors to the coal bunkers needed to be open to provide a constant feed of coal whilst the ship was operating, and closing these in emergency conditions could be problematic. The ship had a double bottom with the space between divided into separate watertight cells. The ship's exceptional height was due to the six decks of passenger accommodation above the waterline, compared to the customary four decks in existing liners.

High-tensile steel was used for the ship's plating, as opposed to the more conventional mild steel. This allowed a reduction in plate thickness, reducing weight but still providing 26 per cent greater strength than otherwise. Plates were held together by triple rows of rivets. The ship was heated and cooled throughout by a thermo-tank ventilation system, which used steam-driven heat exchangers to warm air to a constant 65 °F (18.3 °C), while steam was injected into the airflow to maintain steady humidity.

Forty-nine separate units driven by electric fans provided seven complete changes of air per hour throughout the ship, through an interconnected system, so that individual units could be switched off for maintenance. A separate system of exhaust fans removed air from galleys and bathrooms. As built, the ship conformed fully with Board of Trade safety regulations which required sixteen lifeboats with a capacity of about 1,000 people.

At the time of her completion, Lusitania was briefly the largest ship ever built, but was soon eclipsed by the slightly larger Mauretania which entered service shortly afterwards. She was 3 ft (0.91 m) longer, a full 2 knots (3.7 km/h; 2.3 mph) faster, and had a capacity of 10,000 gross register tons over and above that of the most modern German liner, Kronprinzessin Cecilie. Passenger accommodation was 50% larger than any of her competitors, providing for 552 saloon class, 460 cabin class and 1,186 in third class. Her crew comprised 69 on deck, 369 operating engines and boilers and 389 to attend to passengers. Both she and Mauretania had a wireless telegraph, electric lighting, electric lifts, sumptuous interiors and an early form of air-conditioning.

=== Interiors ===
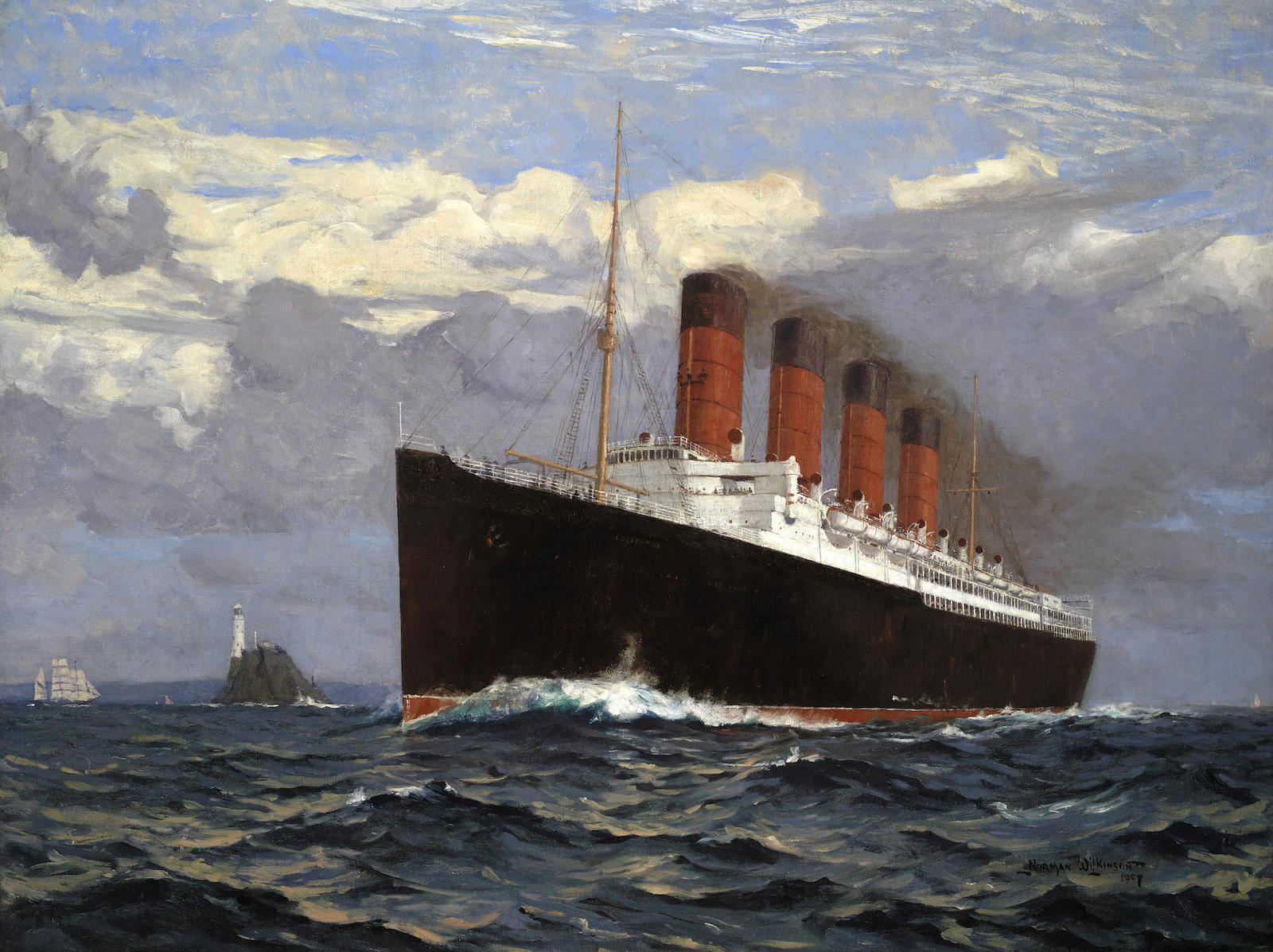
Painting of Lusitania by Norman Wilkinson

Lusitania and Mauretania possessed the most luxurious, spacious, and comfortable interiors afloat at the time. Scottish architect James Miller was chosen to design Lusitania's interiors, while Harold Peto was chosen to design Mauretania. Miller chose to use plasterwork to create interiors, whereas Peto made extensive use of wooden panelling, with the result that the overall impression given by Lusitania was brighter than Mauretania.

The ship's passenger accommodation was spread throughout six decks. From the top deck down to the waterline, they were: Boat Deck (A Deck), the Promenade Deck (B Deck), the Shelter Deck (C Deck), the Upper Deck (D Deck), the Main Deck (E Deck), and the Lower Deck (F Deck), with each of the three passenger classes being allotted their own space on the ship. First-class, second-class, and third-class passengers were strictly segregated from one another, as was the norm for cruise ships at the time. She was designed to carry 2,198 passengers and 827 crew members, according to her original configuration in 1907.

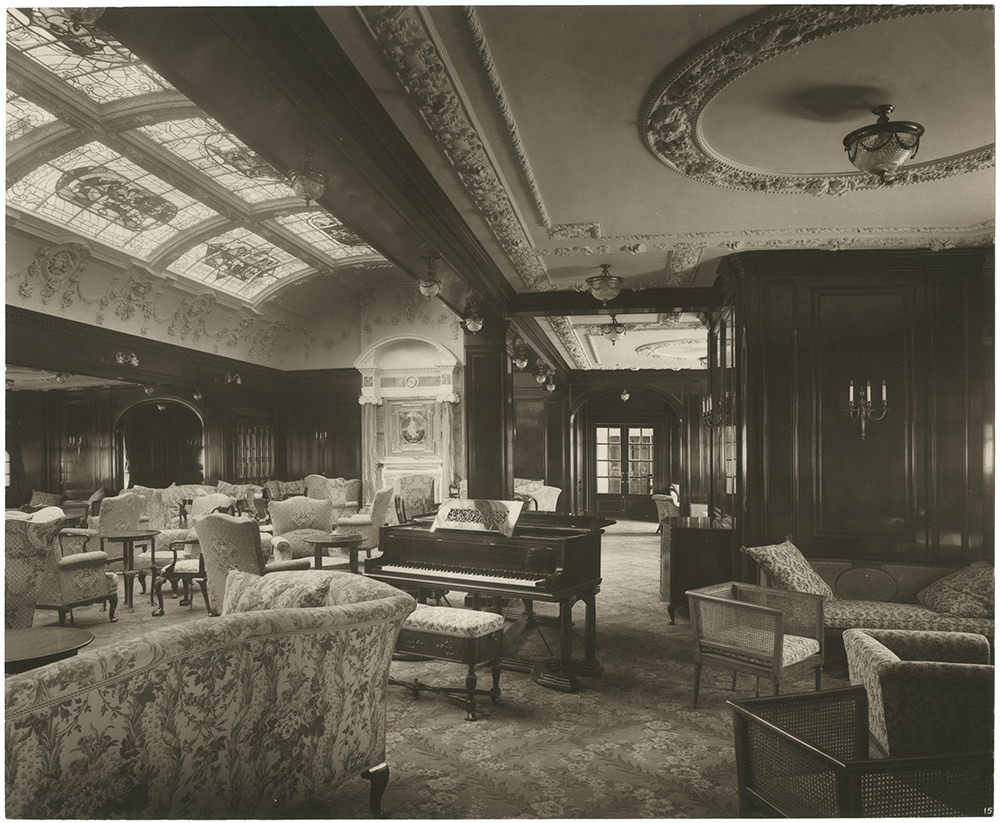
Lounge and music room

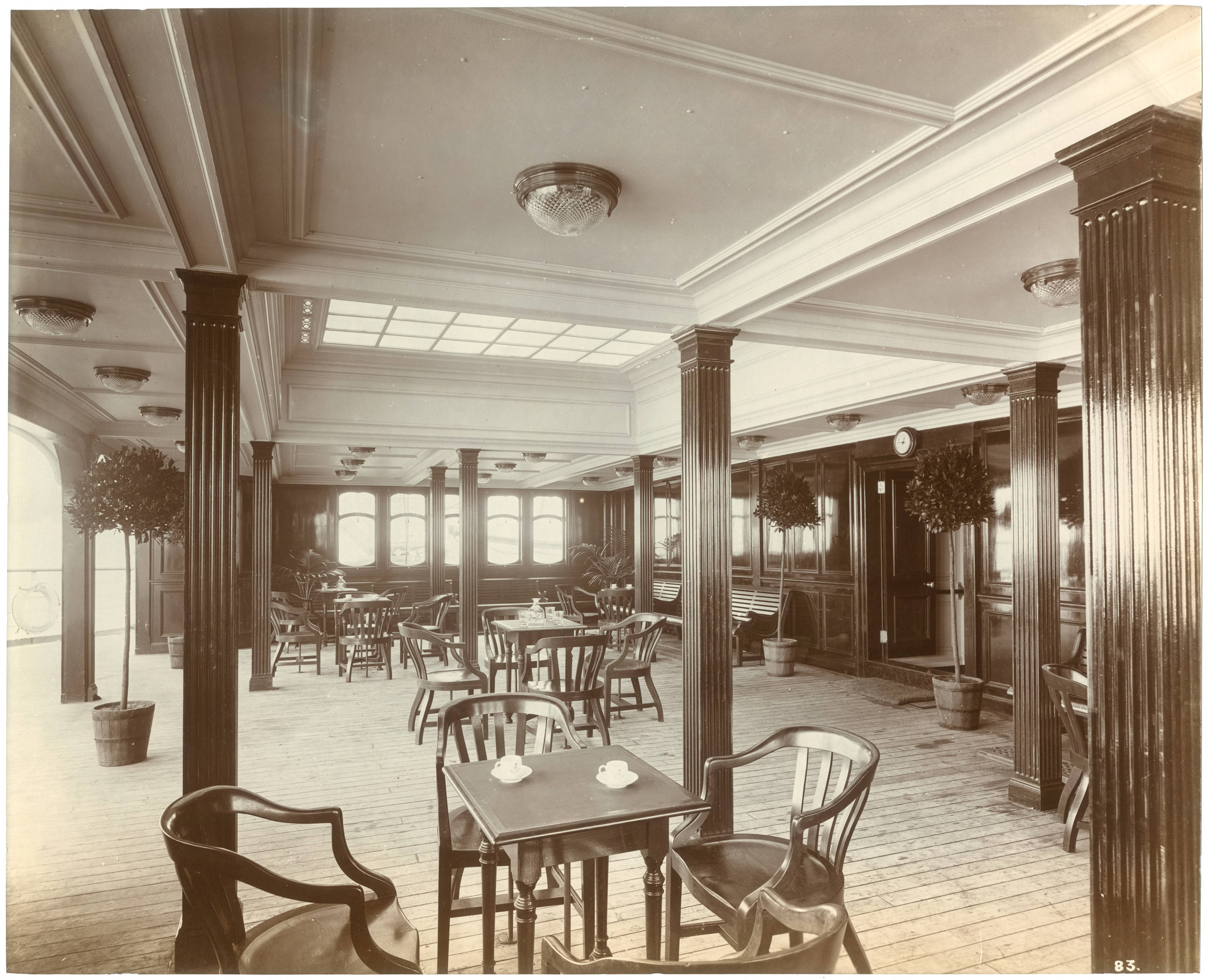
Verandah cafe

Lusitania's first-class accommodation was in the centre section of the ship on the five uppermost decks, mostly concentrated between the first and fourth funnels. She could cater to 552 first-class passengers when fully booked.

Lusitania's first-class interiors were decorated with a mélange of historical styles. The first-class dining saloon was the grandest of the ship's public rooms, arranged over two decks with an open circular well at its centre and crowned by an elaborate dome measuring 29 feet (8.8 m), decorated with frescos in the style of François Boucher, realised throughout in the neoclassical Louis XVI style. The lower floor measured 85 feet (26 m) and could seat 323, with a further 147 on the 65-foot (20 m) upper floor. The walls were finished with white and gilt carved mahogany panels, with Corinthian decorated columns which were required to support the floor above. The one concession to seaborne life was that furniture was bolted to the floor, meaning that passengers could not rearrange their seating for their personal convenience.

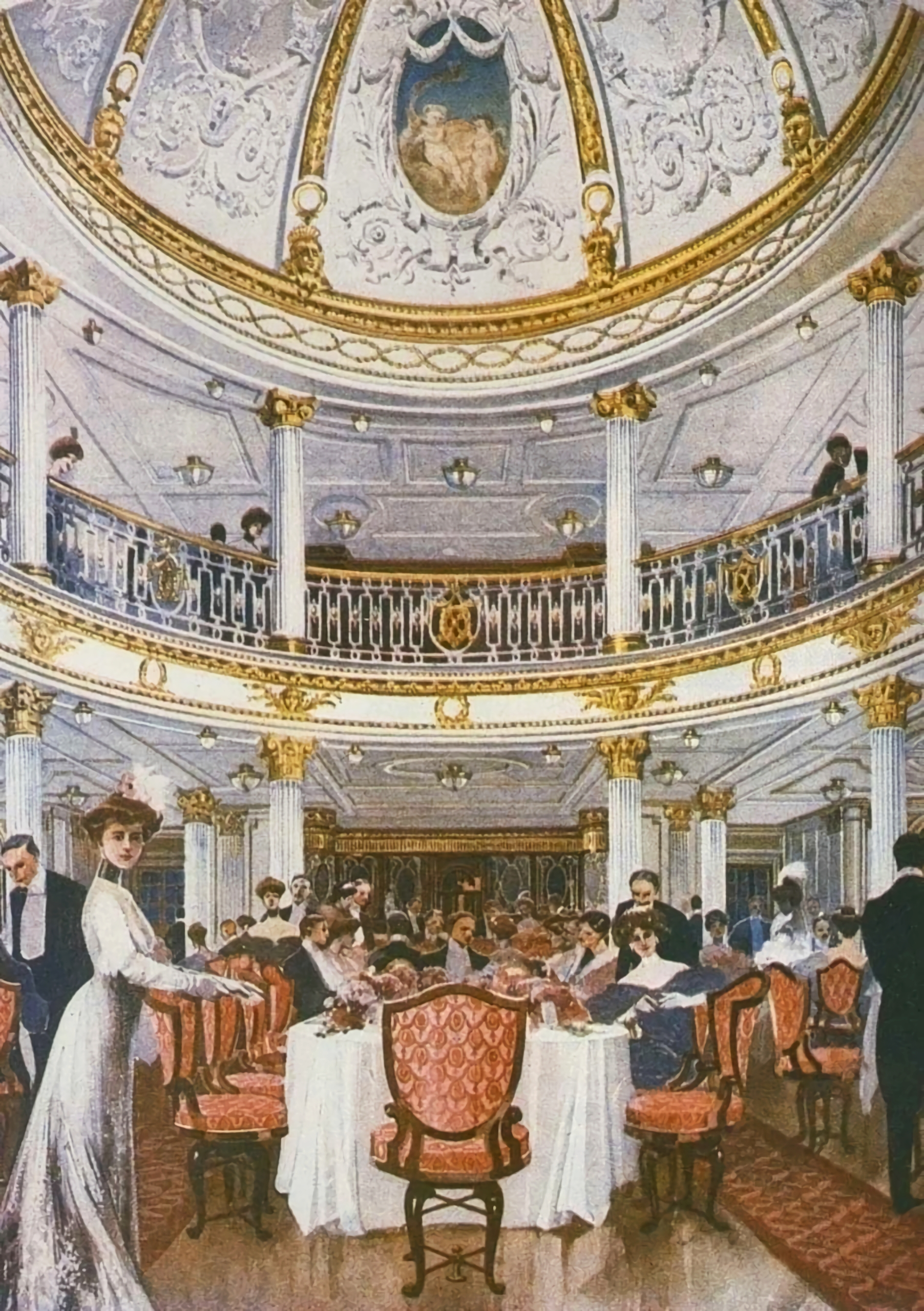
Promotional material showing the first-class dining room

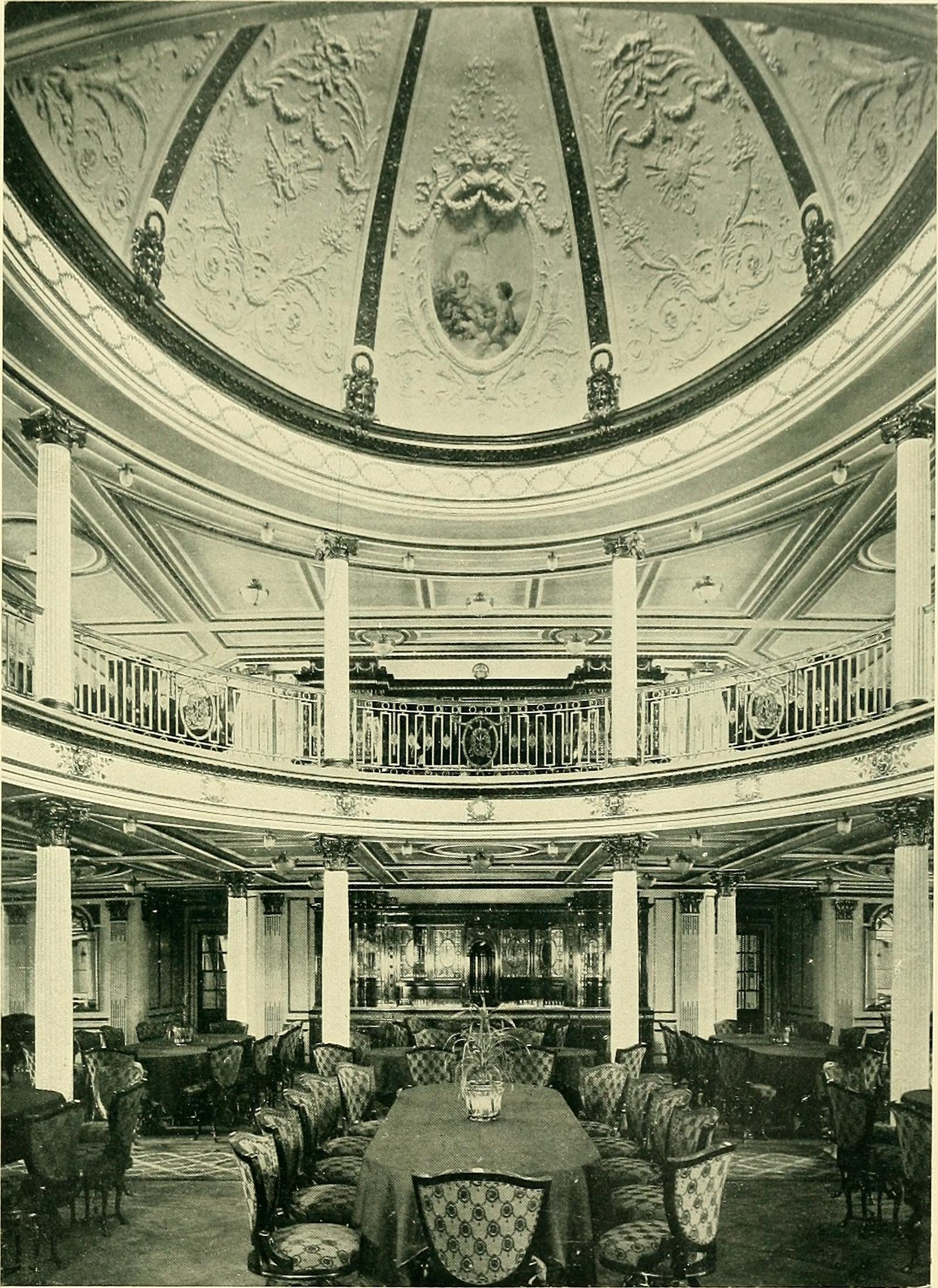
Finished first-class dining room

All other first-class public rooms were situated on the boat deck and composed of a lounge, reading and writing room, smoking room, and veranda café. The café was an innovation on a Cunard liner; one side could be opened up in warm weather to give the impression of sitting outdoors. This would have been a rarely used feature given the often inclement weather of the North Atlantic.

The first-class lounge was decorated in Georgian style with inlaid mahogany panels surrounding a jade green carpet with a yellow floral pattern, measuring overall 68 ft (21 m). It had a barrel vaulted skylight rising to 20 ft (6.1 m) with stained glass windows each representing one month of the year.

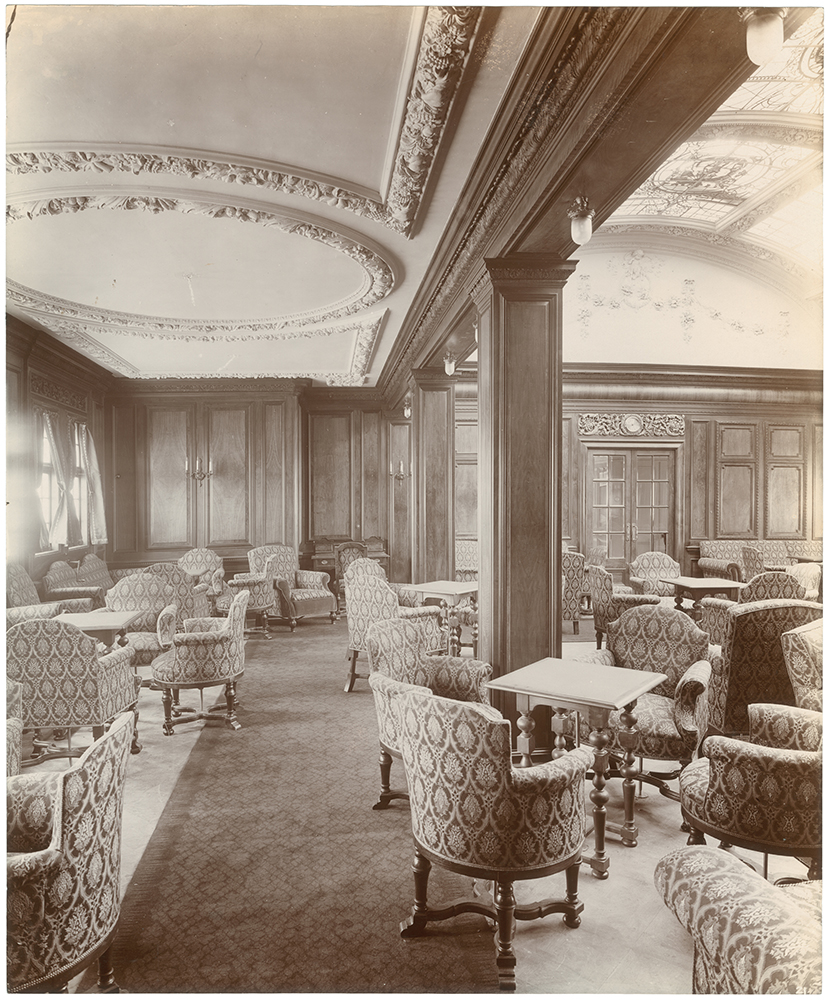
First-class smoking room

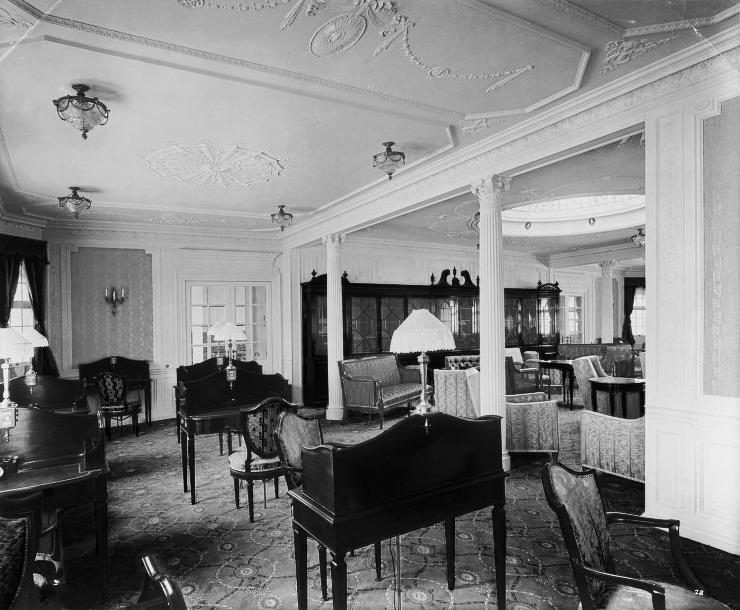
First-class reading and writing room

Each end of the lounge had a 14-foot (4.3 m) high green marble fireplace incorporating enamelled panels by Alexander Fisher. The design was linked overall with decorative plasterwork. The library walls were decorated with carved pilasters and mouldings marking out panels of grey and cream silk brocade. The carpet was rose, with Rose du Barry silk curtains and upholstery. The chairs and writing desks were mahogany, and the windows featured etched glass. The smoking room was Queen Anne style, with Italian walnut panelling and Italian red furnishings. The grand stairway linked all six decks, with wide hallways on each level and two lifts. First-class cabins ranged from one shared room through various suite arrangements in a choice of decorative styles, culminating in the two regal suites which had two bedrooms, dining room, parlour, and bathroom. The port suite decoration was modelled on the Petit Trianon.

Lusitania's second-class accommodation was confined to the stern behind the aft mast, with quarters for 460 passengers. The second-class public rooms were situated on partitioned sections of boat and promenade decks housed in a separate section of the superstructure aft of the first-class passenger quarters. Design work was deputised to Robert Whyte, who was the architect employed by John Brown. The design of the dining room reflected that of first class, with just one floor of diners under a ceiling with a smaller dome and balcony. Walls were panelled and carved with decorated pillars, all in white. The dining room was situated lower down in the ship on the saloon deck. The smoking and ladies' rooms occupied the accommodation space of the second-class promenade deck, with the lounge on the boat deck.

The 42-foot (13 m) room had mahogany tables, chairs, and settees set on a rose carpet. The smoking room was 52 ft (16 m) with mahogany panelling, white plaster work ceiling and dome. One wall had a mosaic of a river scene in Brittany, while the sliding windows were blue-tinted. Second-class passengers were allotted shared two- and four-berth cabins arranged on the shelter, upper, and main decks.

Third class aboard Lusitania was praised for the improvement in travel conditions that it provided to passengers; Lusitania proved to be a popular ship for emigrants. Third-class accommodation in most ships of the time consisted of large open spaces where hundreds of people would share open berths and hastily constructed public spaces, often consisting of no more than a small portion of open deck space and a few tables constructed within their sleeping quarters. In an attempt to break that mould, the Cunard Line began designing ships such as Lusitania with more comfortable third-class accommodation. Third-class accommodation aboard Lusitania was located at the forward end of the ship on the shelter, upper, main, and lower decks, and it was comfortable and spacious compared with other ships of the time. The 79-foot (24 m) dining room was at the bow of the ship on the saloon deck, finished in polished pine, as were the smoke room and ladies room on the shelter deck.

When Lusitania was fully booked in third class, the smoking and ladies room could easily be converted into overflow dining rooms for added convenience. Meals were eaten at long tables with swivel chairs and there were two sittings for meals. A piano was provided for passenger use. What greatly appealed to emigrants and lower class travellers was the honeycomb of two, four, six, and eight berth cabins allotted to third-class passengers on the main and lower decks, instead of being confined to open berth dormitories.

The Bromsgrove Guild had designed and constructed most of the trim on Lusitania. Waring and Gillow supplied a number of the furnishings.

=== Construction and trials ===
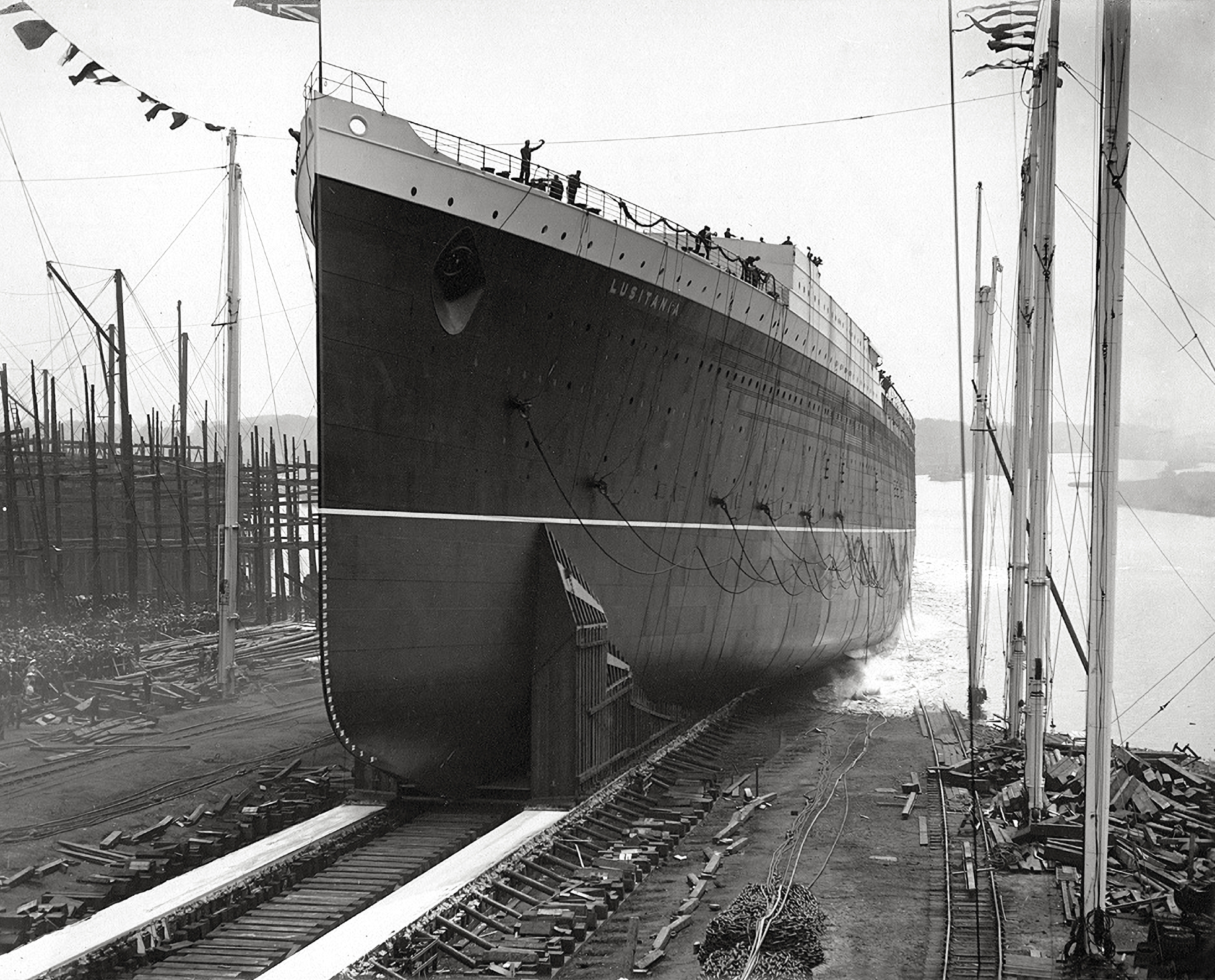
Lusitania's launch, 7 June 1906

Lusitania's keel was laid at John Brown on Clydebank as yard no. 367 on 17 August 1904, Lord Inverclyde hammering home the first rivet. Cunard nicknamed her 'the Scottish ship' in contrast to Mauretania whose contract went to Swan Hunter in England and who started building three months later. Final details of the two ships were left to designers at the two yards so that the ships differed in details of hull design and finished structure. The ships may most readily be distinguished in photographs through the flat-topped ventilators used on Lusitania, whereas those on Mauretania used a more conventional rounded top.

The shipyard at John Brown had to be re-organised because of her size so that she could be launched diagonally across the widest available part of the river Clyde where it met a tributary (the River Cart), the ordinary width of the river being only 610 feet (190 m) compared to the 786-foot (240 m) long ship. The new slipway took up the space of two existing ones and was built on reinforcing piles driven deeply into the ground to ensure it could take the temporary concentrated weight of the whole ship as it slid into the water. In addition, the company spent £8,000 to dredge the Clyde, £6,500 on a new gas plant, £6,500 on a new electrical plant, £18,000 to extend the dock and £19,000 for a new crane capable of lifting 150 tons as well as £20,000 on additional machinery and equipment. Construction commenced at the bow working backwards, rather than the traditional approach of building both ends towards the middle. This was because designs for the stern and engine layout were not finalised when construction commenced. Railway tracks were laid alongside the ship and across deck plating to bring materials as required. The hull, completed to the level of the main deck but not fitted with equipment weighed about 16,000 tons.

The ship's stockless bower anchors weighed 10 1/4 tons, attached to 125 ton, 600 metres (330 fathoms) chains all manufactured by N. Hingley & Sons Ltd. The steam capstans to raise them were constructed by Napier Brothers Ltd, of Glasgow. The turbines were 25 ft (7.6 m) long with 12 ft (3.7 m) diameter rotors, the large diameter necessary because of the relatively low speeds at which they operated. The rotors were constructed on site, while the casings and shafting were constructed in John Brown's Atlas works in Sheffield. The machinery to drive the 56-ton rudder was constructed by Brown Brothers of Edinburgh. A main steering engine drove the rudder through worm gear and clutch operating on a toothed quadrant rack, with a reserve engine operating separately on the rack via a chain drive for emergency use. The 17-foot (5.2 m) three-bladed propellers were fitted and then cased in wood to protect them during the launch.

The ship was launched on 7 June 1906, eight weeks later than planned due to labour strikes and eight months after Lord Inverclyde's death. Princess Louise was invited to name the ship but could not attend, so the honour fell to Inverclyde's widow Mary. The launch was attended by 600 invited guests and thousands of spectators. One thousand tons of drag chains were attached to the hull by temporary rings to slow it once it entered the water. The wooden supporting structure was held back by cables so that once the ship entered the water it would slip forward out of its support. Six tugs were on hand to capture the hull and move it to the fitting out berth. Testing of the ship's engines took place in June 1907 prior to full trials scheduled for July. A preliminary cruise, or Builder's Trial, was arranged for 27 July with representatives of Cunard, the Admiralty, the Board of Trade, and John Brown aboard. The ship achieved speeds of 25.6 knots (47.4 km/h; 29.5 mph) over a measured 1 mile (1.6 km) at Skelmorlie with turbines running at 194 revolutions per minute producing 76,000 SHP. At high speeds the ship was found to suffer such vibration at the stern as to render the second-class accommodation uninhabitable. VIP invited guests now came on board for a two-day shakedown cruise during which the ship was tested under continuous running at speeds of 15, 18 and 21 knots but not her maximum speed. On 29 July, the guests departed and three days of full trials commenced. The ship travelled four times between the Corsewall Light off Scotland to the Longship Light off Cornwall at 23 and 25 knots, between the Corsewall Light and the Isle of Man, and the Isle of Arran and Ailsa Craig. Over 300 mi (480 km) an average speed of 25.4 knots was achieved, comfortably greater than the 24 knots required under the Admiralty contract. The ship could stop in 4 minutes in 3/4 of a mile starting from 23 knots at 166 rpm and then applying full reverse. She achieved a speed of 26 knots over a measured mile loaded to a draught of 33 feet (10 m), and managed 26.5 knots over a 60-mile (97 km) course drawing 31.5 ft (9.6 m). At 180 revolutions a turning test was conducted and the ship performed a complete circle of diameter 1000 yards in 50 seconds. The rudder required 20 seconds to be turned hard to 35 degrees.

The vibration was determined to be caused by interference between the wake of the outer propellers and inner and became worse when turning. At high speeds the vibration frequency resonated with the ship's stern making the matter worse. The solution was to add internal stiffening to the stern of the ship but this necessitated gutting the second-class areas and then rebuilding them. This required the addition of a number of pillars and arches to the decorative scheme. The ship was finally delivered to Cunard on 26 August although the problem of vibration was never entirely solved and further remedial work went on throughout her life.

=== Comparison with the Olympic class ===
The White Star Line's Olympic-class vessels were almost 100 ft (30 m) longer and slightly wider than Lusitania and Mauretania. This made the White Star vessels about 15,000 tons larger than the Cunard vessels. Both Lusitania and Mauretania were launched and had been in service for several years before Olympic or Titanic were ready for the North Atlantic run. Although significantly faster than the Olympic class would be, the speed of Cunard's vessels was not sufficient to allow the line to run a weekly two-ship transatlantic service from each side of the Atlantic. A third ship was needed for a weekly service, and in response to White Star's announced plan to build the three Olympic-class ships, Cunard ordered a third ship: Aquitania. Like Olympic, Cunard's Aquitania had a lower service speed, but was a larger and more luxurious vessel.

Due to their increased size the Olympic-class liners could offer many more amenities than Lusitania and Mauretania. Both Olympic and Titanic offered swimming pools, Victorian-style Turkish baths, a gymnasium, a squash court, large reception rooms, À la Carte restaurants separate from the dining saloons, and many more staterooms with private bathroom facilities than their two Cunard rivals.

Heavy vibrations as a by-product of the four steam turbines on Lusitania and Mauretania would plague both ships throughout their voyages. When Lusitania sailed at top speed the resultant vibrations were so severe that second- and third-class sections of the ship could become uninhabitable. In contrast, the Olympic-class liners used two traditional reciprocating engines and only one turbine for the central propeller, which greatly reduced vibration. Because of their greater tonnage and wider beam, the Olympic-class liners were also more stable at sea and less prone to rolling. Lusitania and Mauretania both featured straight prows in contrast to the angled prows of the Olympic class. Designed so that the ships could plunge through a wave rather than crest it, the unforeseen consequence was that the Cunard liners would pitch forward alarmingly, even in calm weather, allowing huge waves to splash the bow and forward part of the superstructure. This would be a major factor in damage that Lusitania suffered at the hands of a rogue wave in January 1910.

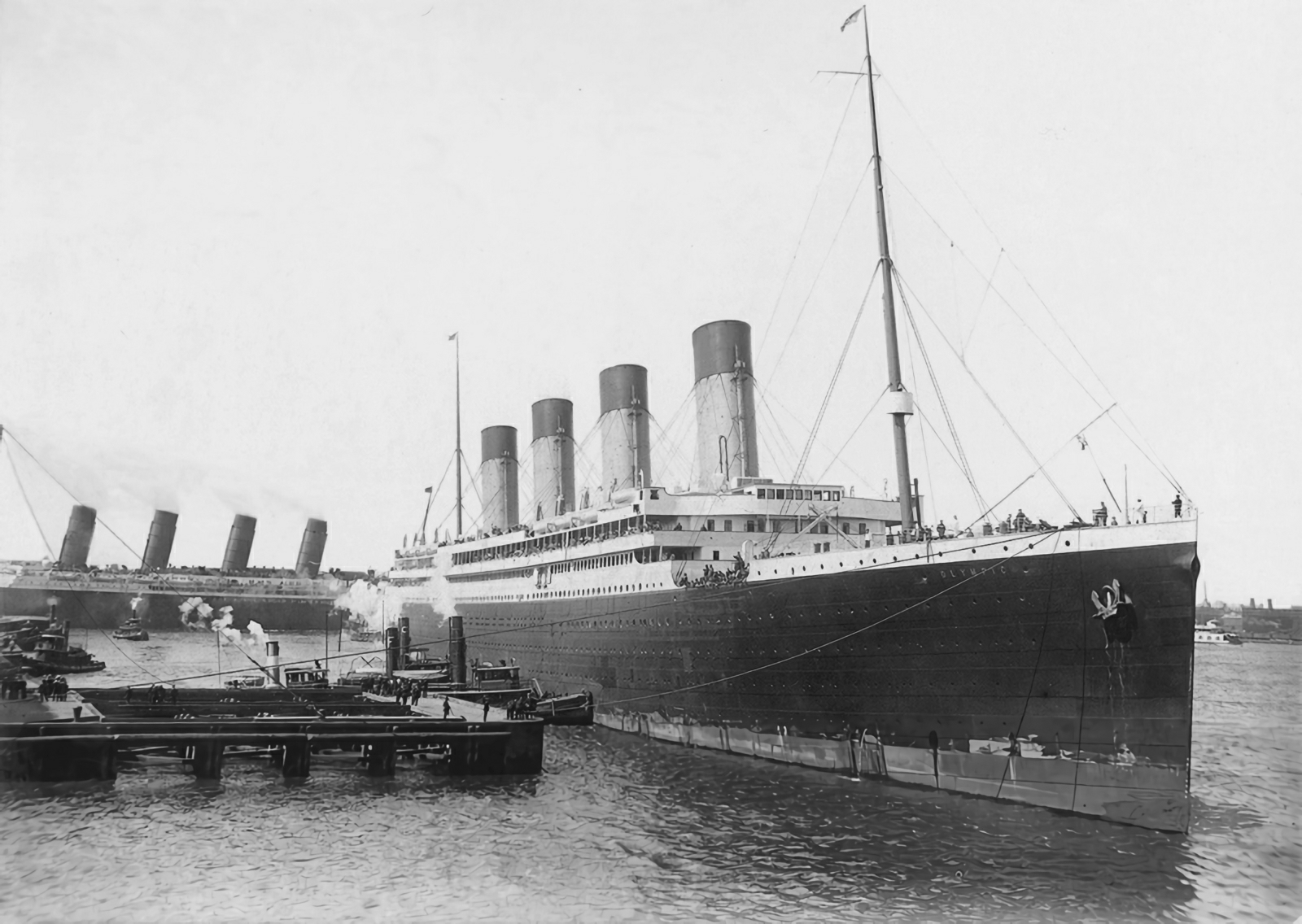
Olympic arriving at port on maiden voyage June 1911, with Lusitania departing in the background

The vessels of the Olympic class also differed from Lusitania and Mauretania in the way in which they were compartmented below the waterline. The White Star vessels were divided by transverse watertight bulkheads. While Lusitania also had transverse bulkheads, it also had longitudinal bulkheads running along the ship on each side, between the boiler and engine rooms and the coal bunkers on the outside of the vessel. The British commission that had investigated the sinking of Titanic in 1912 heard testimony on the flooding of coal bunkers lying outside longitudinal bulkheads. Being of considerable length, when flooded, these could increase the ship's list and "make the lowering of the boats on the other side impracticable"—and this was precisely what later happened with Lusitania. The ship's stability was insufficient for the bulkhead arrangement used: flooding of only three coal bunkers on one side could result in negative metacentric height. On the other hand, Titanic was given ample stability and sank with only a few degrees list, the design being such that there was very little risk of unequal flooding and possible capsize.

Lusitania did not carry enough lifeboats for all her passengers, officers and crew on board at the time of her maiden voyage (carrying four lifeboats fewer than Titanic would carry in 1912). This was a common practice for large passenger ships at the time, since the belief was that in busy shipping lanes help would always be nearby and the few boats available would be adequate to ferry all aboard to rescue ships before a sinking. After the Titanic sank, Lusitania and Mauretania were equipped with an additional six clinker-built wooden boats under davits, making for a total of 22 boats rigged in davits. The rest of their lifeboat accommodations were supplemented with 26 collapsible lifeboats, 18 stored directly beneath the regular lifeboats and eight on the after deck. The collapsibles were built with hollow wooden bottoms and canvas sides, and needed assembly in the event they had to be used.

This contrasted with Olympic and Britannic which received a full complement of lifeboats all rigged under davits. This difference would have been a major contributor to the high loss of life involved with Lusitania's sinking, since there was not sufficient time to assemble collapsible boats or life-rafts, had it not been for the fact that the ship's severe listing made it impossible for lifeboats on the port side of the vessel to be lowered, and the rapidity of the sinking did not allow the remaining lifeboats that could be directly lowered (as these were rigged under davits) to be filled and launched with passengers. When Britannic, working as a hospital ship during the First World War, sank in 1916 after hitting a mine in the Kea Channel the already davited boats were swiftly lowered saving nearly all on board, but the ship took nearly three times as long to sink as Lusitania and thus the crew had more time to evacuate passengers.

== Career ==
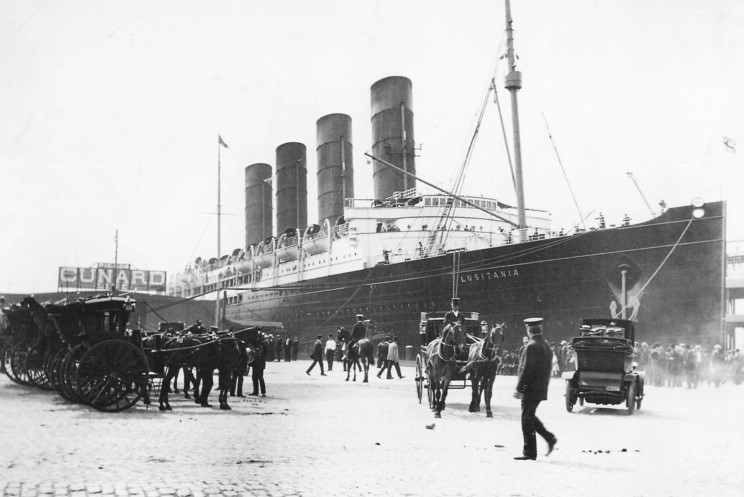
Lusitania arriving in New York on her maiden voyage

Lusitania, commanded by Commodore James Watt, moored at the Liverpool landing stage for her maiden voyage at 4:30 pm on Saturday 7 September 1907 as the onetime Blue Riband holder RMS Lucania vacated the pier. At the time Lusitania was the largest ocean liner in service and would continue to be until the introduction of Mauretania in November that year. A crowd of 200,000 people gathered to see her departure at 9:00 pm for Queenstown, where she was to take on more passengers. She anchored again at Roche's Point, off Queenstown, at 9:20 am the following morning, where she was shortly joined by Lucania, which she had passed in the night, and 120 passengers were brought out to the ship by tender bringing her total of passengers to 2,320.

At 12:10 pm on Sunday, Lusitania was again under way and passing the Daunt Rock Lightship. In the first 24 hours, she achieved 561 mi (903 km), with further daily totals of 575, 570, 593, and 493 mi (793 km) before arriving at Sandy Hook at 9:05 am Friday 13 September, taking in total 5 days and 54 minutes, 30 minutes outside the record time held by Kaiser Wilhelm II of the North German Lloyd line. Fog had delayed the ship on two days, and her engines were not yet run in. In New York hundreds of thousands of people gathered on the bank of the Hudson River from Battery Park to pier 56. All New York's police had been called out to control the crowd. From the start of the day, 100 horse-drawn cabs had been queuing, ready to take away passengers. During the week's stay the ship was made available for guided tours. At 3 pm on Saturday 21 September, the ship departed on the return journey, arriving at Queenstown at 4:00 am 27 September and Liverpool 12 hours later. The return journey was 5 days 4 hours and 19 minutes, again delayed by fog.

On her second voyage in better weather, Lusitania arrived at Sandy Hook on 11 October 1907 in the Blue Riband record time of 4 days, 19 hours and 53 minutes. She had to wait for the tide to enter harbour where news had preceded her and she was met by a fleet of small craft, whistles blaring. Lusitania averaged 23.99 knots (44.43 km/h) westbound and 23.61 knots (43.73 km/h) eastbound. In December 1907, Mauretania entered service and took the record for the fastest eastbound crossing. Lusitania made her fastest westbound crossing in 1909 after her propellers were changed, averaging 25.85 knots (47.87 km/h). She briefly recovered the record in July of that year, but Mauretania recaptured the Blue Riband the same month, retaining it until 1929, when it was taken by SS Bremen. During her eight-year service, she made a total of 201 crossings on the Cunard Line's Liverpool-New York Route, carrying a total of 155,795 passengers westbound and another 106,180 eastbound.

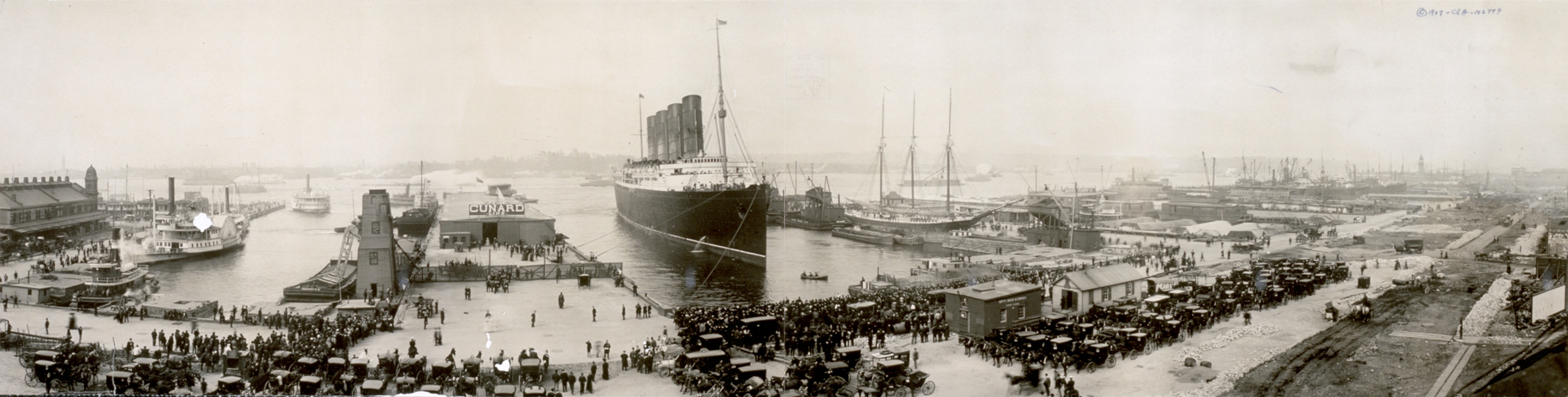
Lusitania at the end of the first leg of her maiden voyage, New York City, September 1907. (The photo was taken with a panoramic camera.)

=== Hudson Fulton Celebration ===
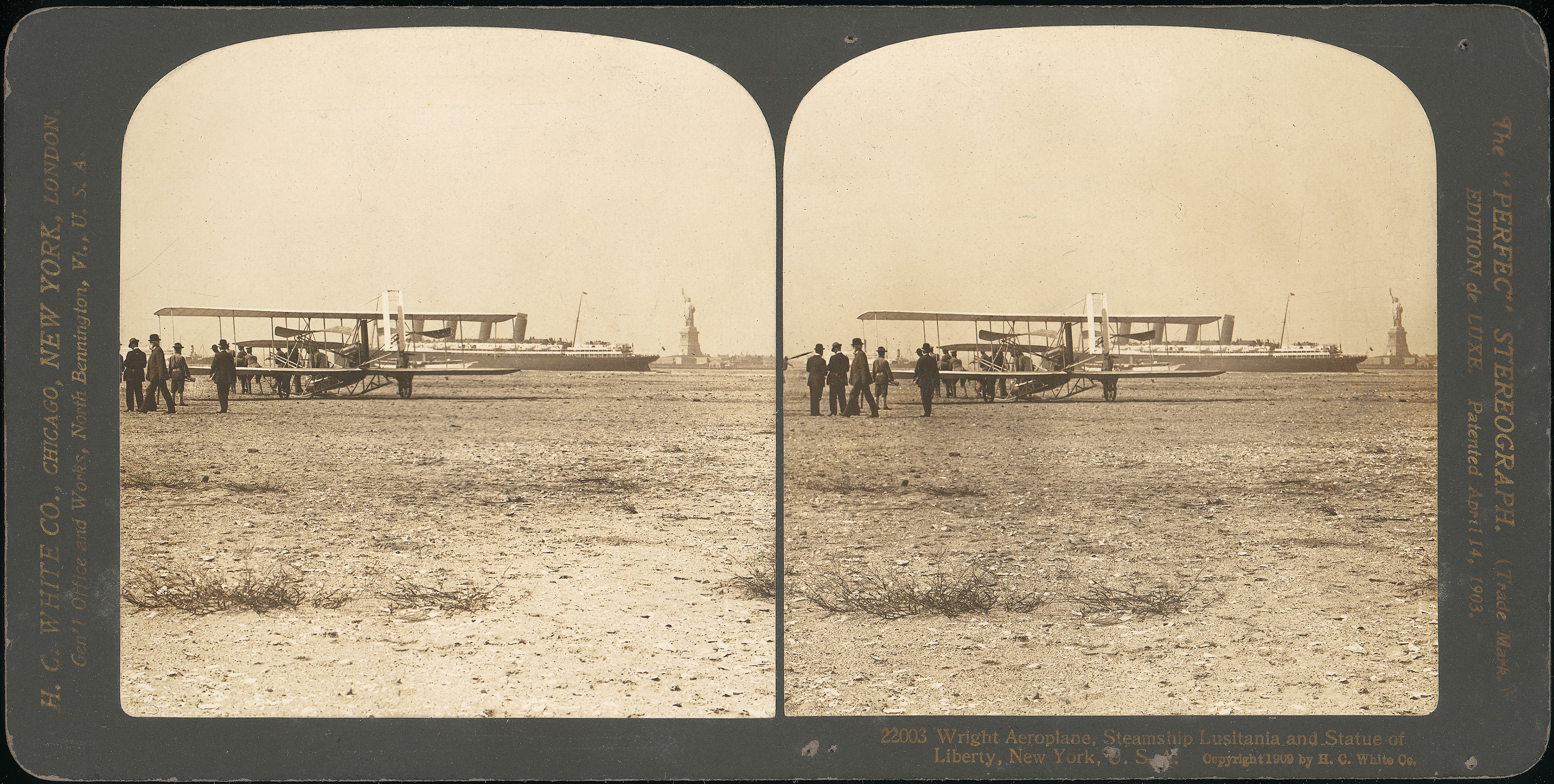
Stereo picture of Wright Flyer, Lusitania (Europe-bound), and the Statue of Liberty, during Hudson Fulton Celebration. In a generation the aeroplane would replace ocean queens like Lusitania as the mainstay of trans-atlantic travel.

Lusitania and other ships participated in the Hudson-Fulton Celebration in New York City from the end of September to early October 1909. The celebration was also a display of the different modes of transportation then in existence, Lusitania representing the newest advancement in steamship technology. A newer mode of travel was the aeroplane. Wilbur Wright had brought a Flyer to Governors Island and made demonstration flights before millions of New Yorkers who had never seen an aeroplane. Some of Wright's trips were directly over Lusitania; several photographs of Lusitania from that week still exist.

== Rogue wave crash ==
On 10 January 1910, Lusitania was two days into a voyage from Liverpool to New York when she encountered a rogue wave 75 feet (23 m) high. The wave rolled over the bow, impacting and damaging the bridge. The forecastle deck was damaged, the bridge windows were smashed, the bridge structure itself was shifted a couple of inches aft, and the deck and bridge were given a permanent depression of a few inches. One person was injured, and Lusitania continued on as normal, arriving a few hours late in New York.

== Outbreak of the First World War ==
Lusitania's construction and operating expenses were subsidised by the British government, with the provision that she could be converted to an armed merchant cruiser (AMC) if needed. This included pillars and supports to enable the emplacement of 12 6-inch naval guns, and on the official Navy List the ship was listed as a "Royal Naval Reserve Merchant Vessel". In the 1914 edition of Jane's All the World's Fighting Ships, its silhouette was listed for identification reasons as a civilian liner, together with Mauretania and all liners of all nations capable of over 18 knots. Brassley's 1914 The Naval Annual categorised her as a "Royal Naval Reserved Merchant Cruiser". When war was declared the Admiralty issued orders for nine liners, including Mauretania and Lusitania to be taken up as armed merchant cruisers. However, the large Cunard liners were soon released, due to their large fuel costs relative to their usefulness and a shortage of guns. They were thus never armed or commissioned.

The treatment of civilian vessels in war is governed by the Cruiser Rules according to international customary law. These required the lives of the crew and passengers to be safeguarded when the ship is confiscated or sunk, unless out of urgent, unforeseen reasons of strict military necessity. Nevertheless, fears ran high for the safety of Lusitania and other great liners despite these rules. Lusitania was painted in a grey colour scheme during her first east-bound crossing after the war started, in an attempt to mask her identity and make her more difficult to detect visually.

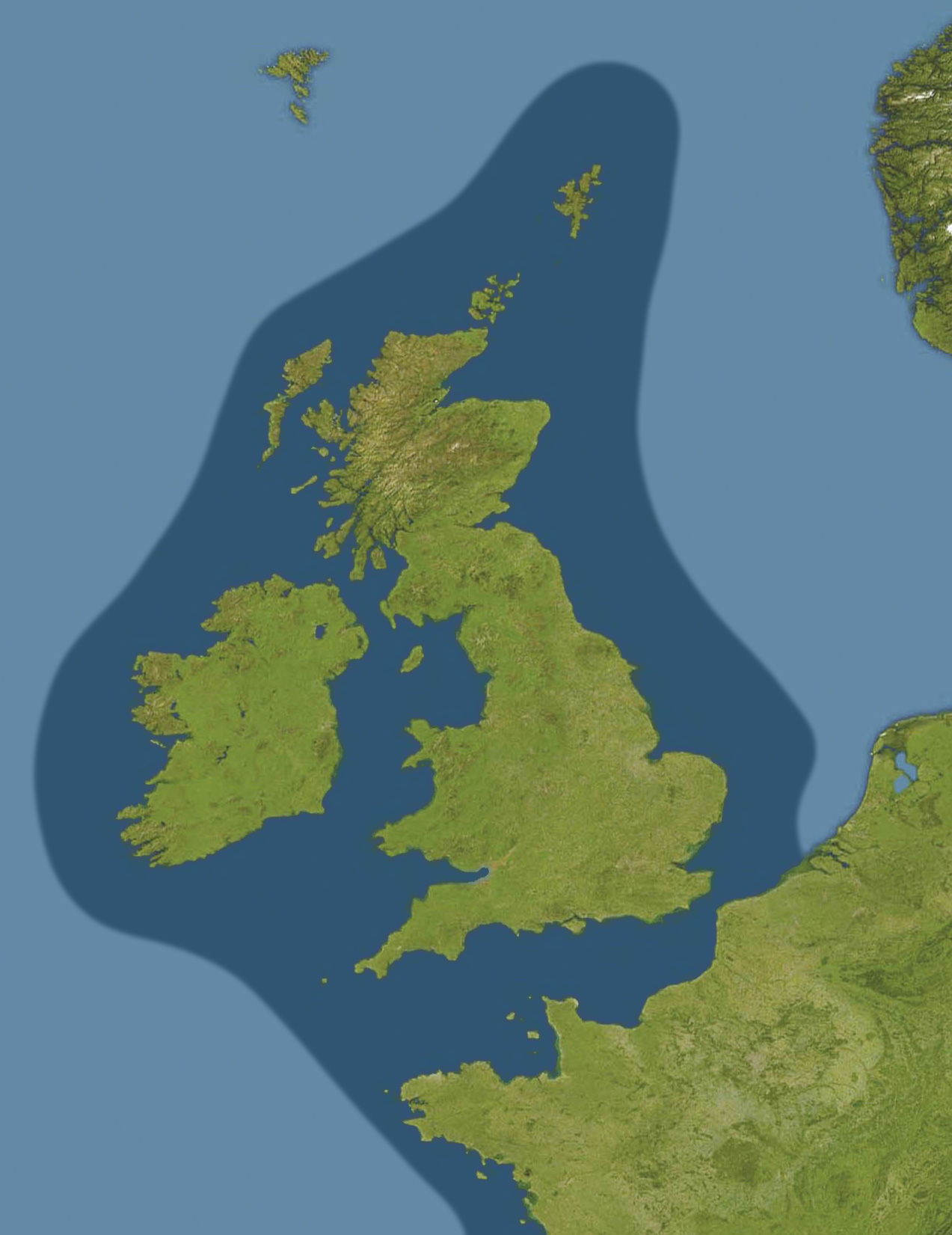
Germany's declared exclusion zone of February 1915. Ships within this area were liable to search and attack.

Many of the large liners were laid up from 1914 to 1915, due in part to falling demand for passenger travel across the Atlantic, and in part to protect them from damage due to mines or other dangers. Some of these liners were eventually used as troop transports, while others became hospital ships, but Lusitania remained in commercial service. Bookings were not strong during that autumn and winter, but demand was high enough to keep her in civilian service.

Cunard took measures to economise, such as shutting down her Number 4 boiler room to conserve coal and crew costs. This reduced her maximum speed from over 25 knots (46 km/h; 29 mph) to 21 knots (39 km/h; 24 mph). The ship's disguised paint scheme was also dropped, and she was returned to civilian colours. Her name was picked out in gilt, her funnels were repainted in their normal Cunard livery, and her superstructure was painted white again. One alteration was the addition of a gold-coloured band around the base of the superstructure just above the black paint.

== 1915 ==
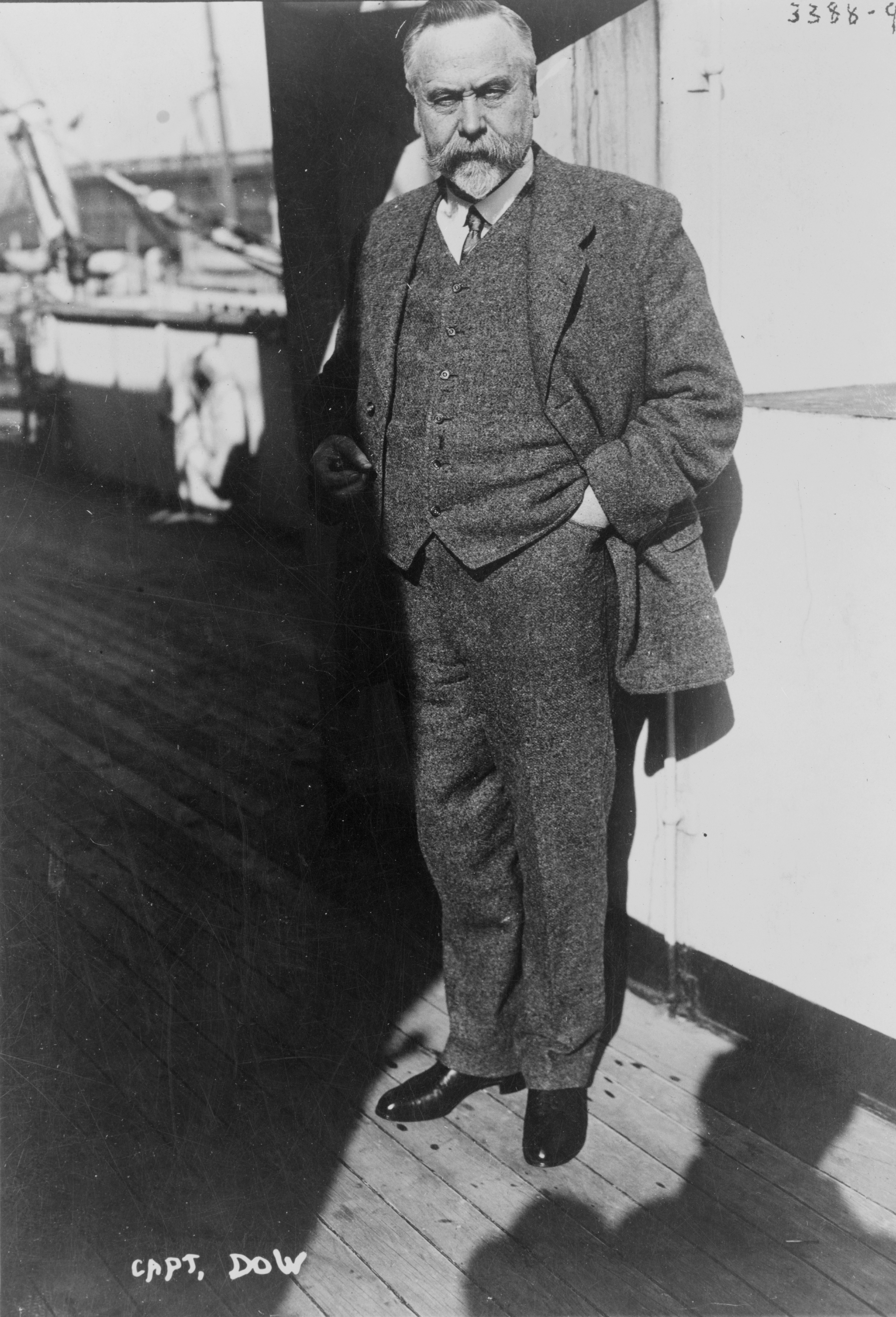
Captain Daniel Dow, Lusitania's penultimate master

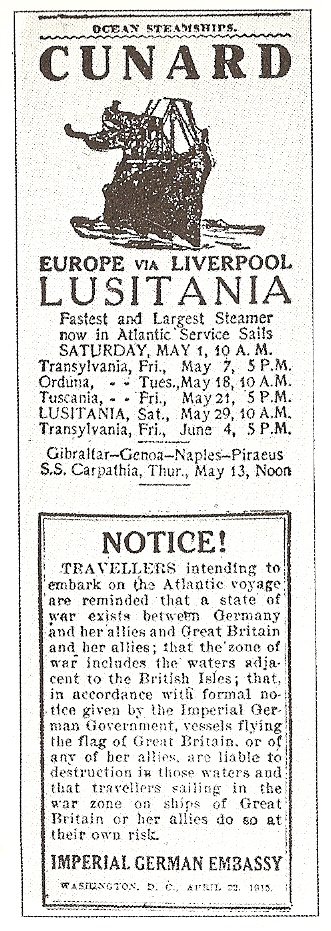
The warning issued by the Imperial German Embassy about travel to the UK, coincidentally juxtaposed with an advert for the Lusitania.

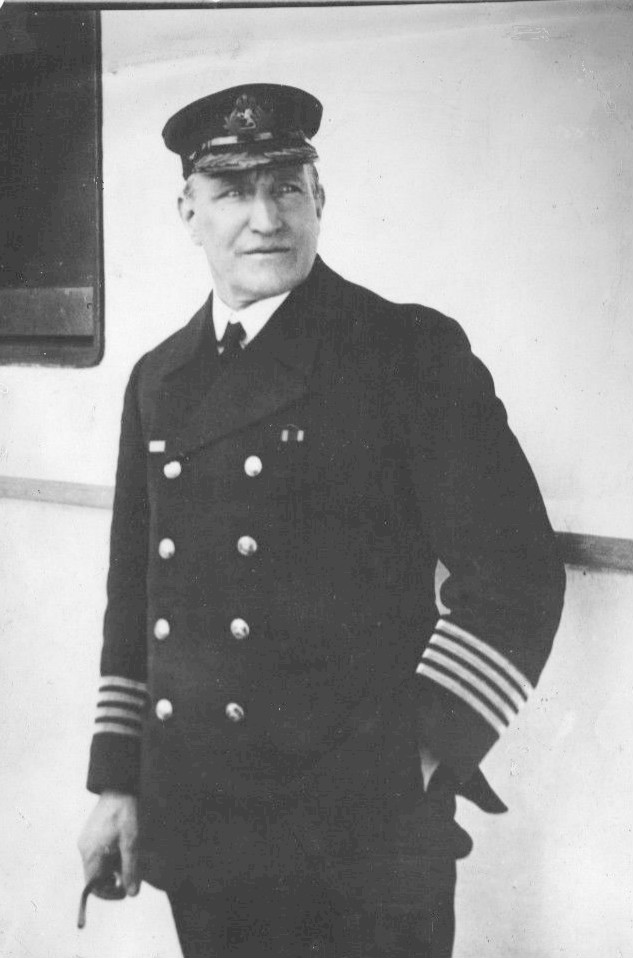
Captain William Thomas Turner, photographed on 11 March 1915.

By early 1915, the new threat of submarines began to grow. On 4 February 1915, Germany declared the seas around Great Britain and Ireland to be a war zone, warning that Allied ships in the area would be sunk without warning beginning by 18 February. This was not wholly unrestricted submarine warfare, as the Germans would take efforts to avoid sinking neutral ships, but "enemy" passenger craft were included as targets, despite the US demand for "strict accountability". U-boat success rates proved to be lower than expected, so the Germans loosened the rules of engagement in April.

Lusitania arrived in Liverpool on 6 February flying the neutral US ensign, which had been raised off southern Ireland causing controversy. She was next scheduled to arrive in Liverpool on 6 March 1915. The Admiralty issued specific instructions on how to avoid submarines, adding to earlier advice that ships should try to evade submarines if possible or steer towards them to force them to dive. Bailey and Ryan have argued that such instructions could compromise the ship's rights under cruiser rules. Admiral Henry Oliver ordered HMS Louis and HMS Laverock to escort Lusitania, and took the further precaution of sending the Q-ship HMS Lyons to patrol Liverpool Bay. (Note: Referred to in Lusitania, by Preston (2002a), and Lusitania: An Illustrated Biography by Layton (2010).) Due to a communications issue, Captain Daniel Dow did not make contact with the destroyers but proceeded to Liverpool unescorted.

Some alterations were made to the ship's protocols. She was ordered not to fly any flags in the war zone. There was no hope of disguising her identity, however, as her profile was so well known, and the British made no attempt to paint out the ship's name at the bow. (Note: New photographic evidence presented in Lusitania: An Illustrated Biography.Layton (2010)) Captain Dow was replaced by Captain William Thomas Turner, who had commanded Lusitania, Mauretania, and Aquitania in the years before the war.

On 17 April 1915, Lusitania left Liverpool on her 201st transatlantic voyage, arriving in New York on 24 April. On 22 April, the German Embassy under Johann Heinrich von Bernstorff submitted a general warning about travel to 50 American newspapers, including those in New York, which coincidentally appeared in newspapers just before the ship sailed.

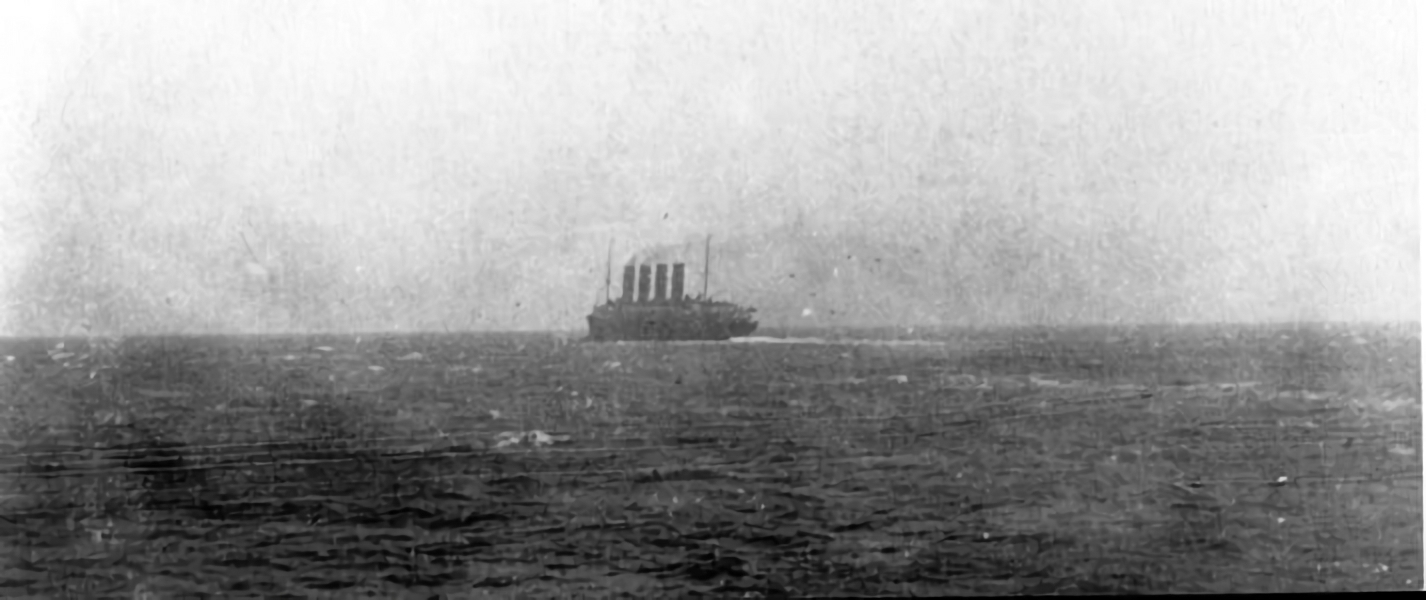
Lusitania departing New York on her final voyage, 1 May 1915

The ship departed Pier 54 in New York on 1 May 1915 at 12:20 pm on her final voyage. The Saturday evening edition of The Washington Times published two articles on its front page referring to the previous day's warnings.

== Sinking ==
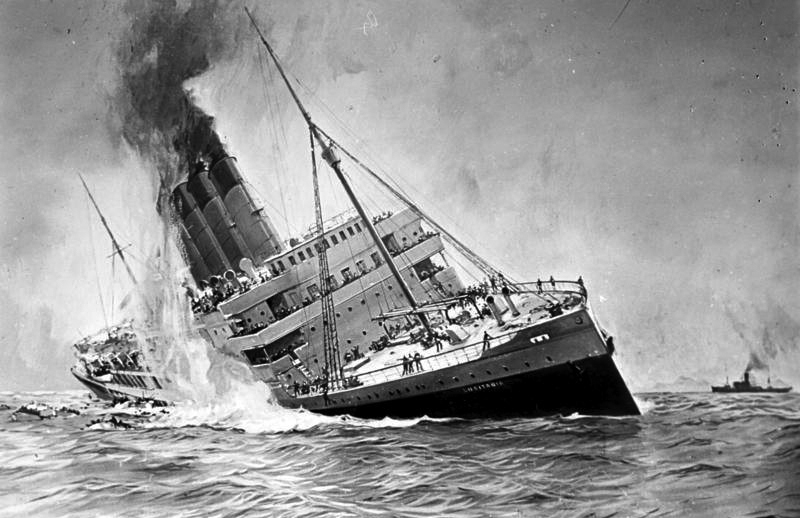
Painting of the sinking, from the German Federal Archives

Sinking of RMS Lusitania on a map of Ireland (present-day boundaries shown)

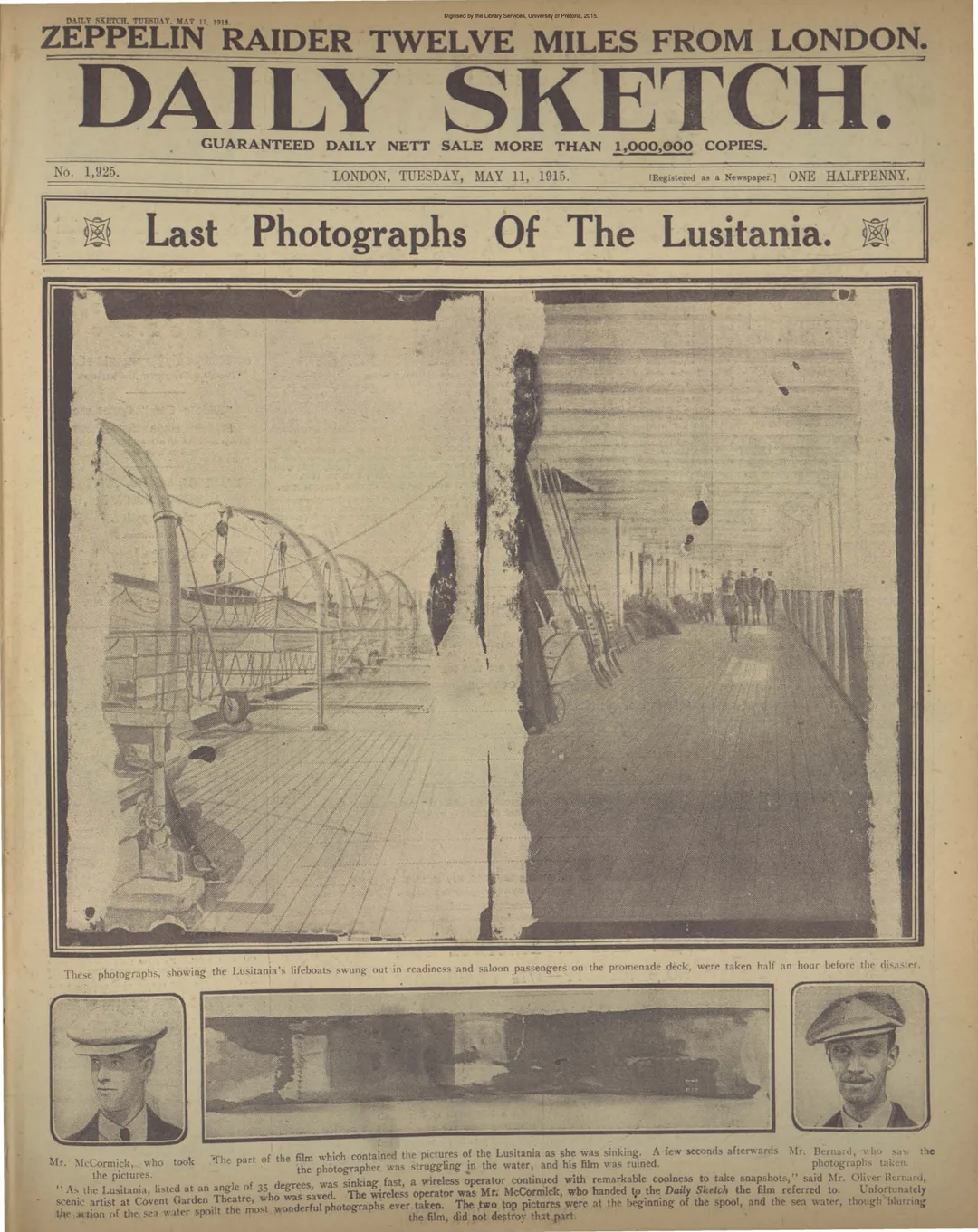
Last Pictures [bottom] of the sinking of the Lusitiana May 1915 from the "Daily Sketch" 11 May 1915

On 7 May 1915, Lusitania was nearing the end of her 202nd crossing, bound for Liverpool from New York, and was scheduled to dock at the Prince's Landing Stage later that afternoon. Aboard her were 1,264 passengers, three stowaways, and a crew of 693, totalling 1,960 people. She was also carrying around 173 tons of war supplies on board, consisting of 4.2 million rounds of rifle ammunition, almost 5,000 shrapnel-filled artillery shell casings and 3,240 brass percussion fuses.

She was running parallel to the south coast of Ireland and was roughly 11 nautical miles (20 km; 13 mi) off the Old Head of Kinsale when she crossed in front of U-20 at 2:10 pm. The U-boat's commanding officer Walther Schwieger later claimed not to have identified the ship, and he gave the order to fire one torpedo. He reported that it struck Lusitania on the starboard bow, just behind the bridge. Moments later, a second explosion erupted from within Lusitania's hull where the torpedo had struck, and the ship began to founder rapidly, with a prominent list to starboard. (Note: From Beesly (1982, pp. 84–85): U-20 log entry transcript. Log first published in L'illustration in 1920)

The crew scrambled to launch the lifeboats almost immediately, but the conditions of the sinking made their usage extremely difficult or even impossible because of the ship's severe list. Only six out of 48 lifeboats were launched successfully, with several more overturning and breaking apart. The ship's trim levelled out 18 minutes later, and she sank at position 51°24′45″N 08°32′52″W, with the funnels and masts the last to disappear.

Map showing the movements of RMS Lusitania and SM U-20 prior to the sinking of the former. Marked are ships sunk by U-20 on 6 and 7 May and key geographic points.

A total of 1,199 lost their lives out of the 1,960 passengers and crew aboard at the time of the sinking. In the hours after the sinking, both the survivors and the Irish rescuers who had heard word of Lusitania's distress signals performed many acts of heroism, and this brought the survivor count to 767, four of whom later died from injuries. HMS Juno sortied briefly in contravention of Royal Navy policy, but turned back believing that there was no "urgent necessity". By the following morning, the true scope of the disaster had spread around the world. Most of those lost in the sinking were British or Canadian, but 128 Americans were also lost, including writer and publisher Elbert Hubbard, builder Albert Clay Bilicke, theatrical producer Charles Frohman, businessman Alfred Gwynne Vanderbilt, and Newport News Shipbuilding president Albert L. Hopkins.

== Aftermath ==
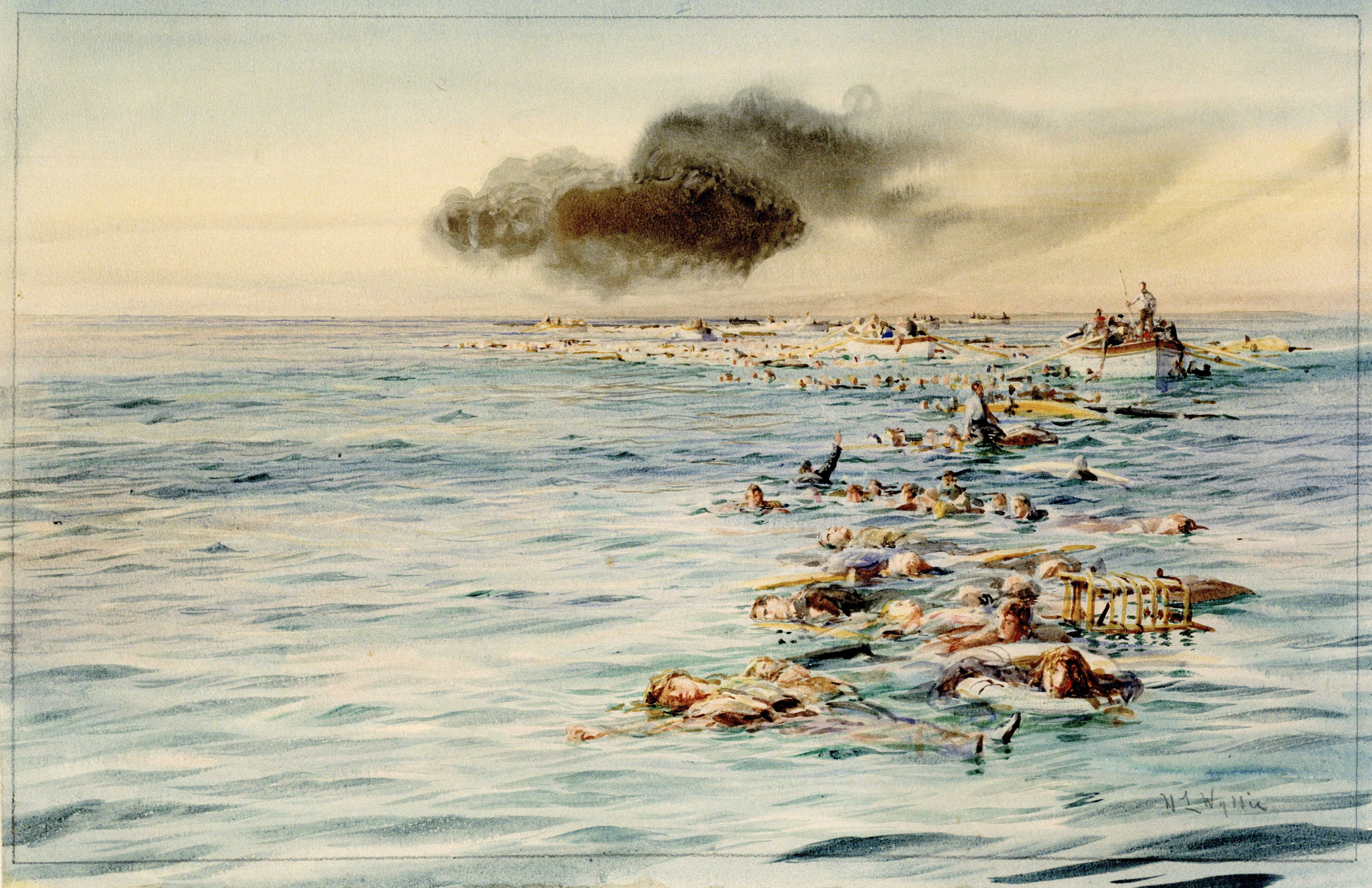
The track of Lusitania. View of casualties and survivors in the water and in lifeboats. Painting by William Lionel Wyllie

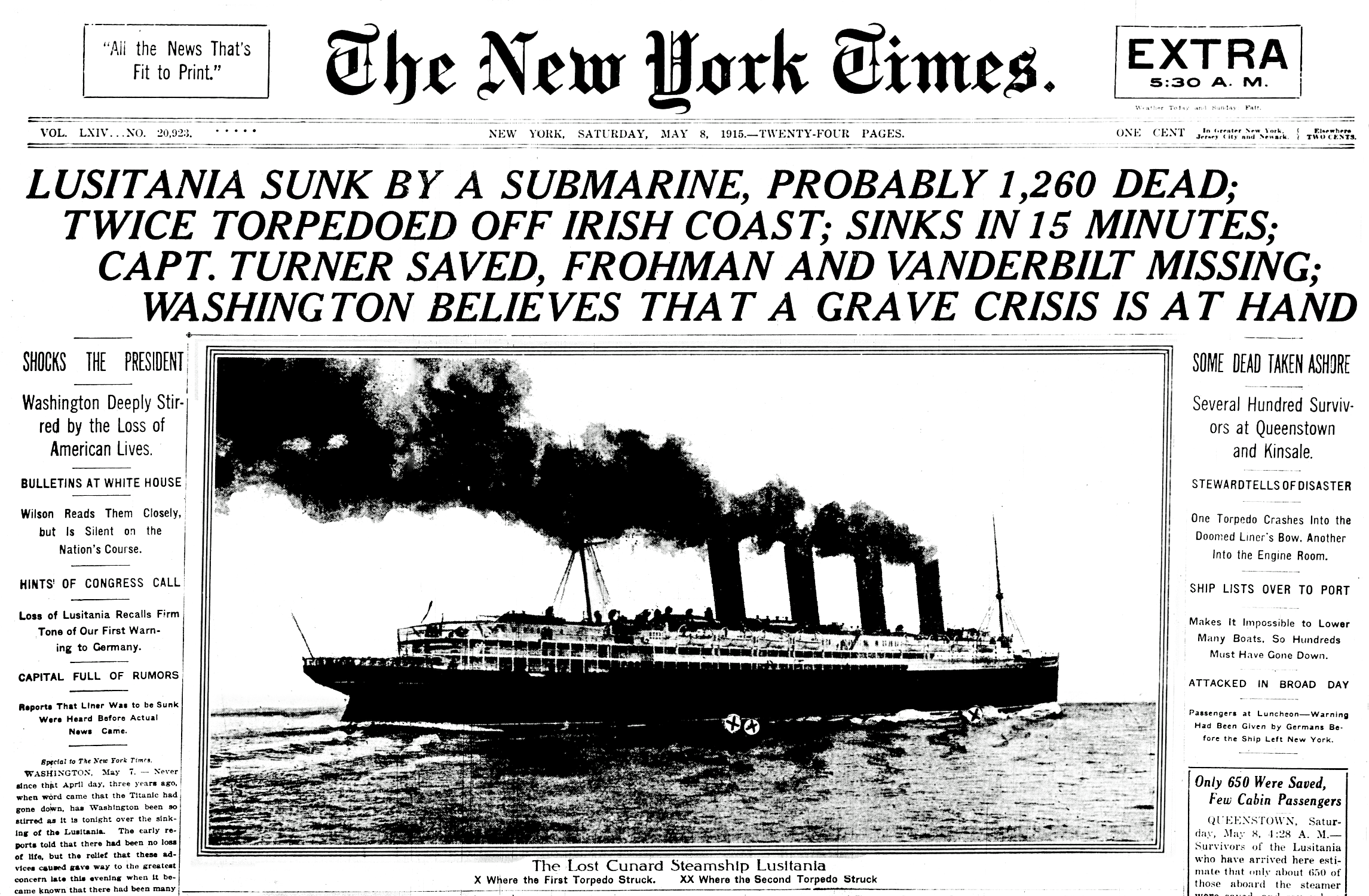
The New York Times article expressed the immediate recognition of the serious implications of the sinking, this lead story on 8 May having a section (below what is pictured here) titled "Nation's Course in Doubt".

The sinking caused an international outcry, especially in Britain and across the British Empire, as well as in the United States. On 8 May, unofficial German spokesman Bernhard Dernburg said that Lusitania "carried contraband of war" and that "she was classed as an auxiliary cruiser", so Germany had a right to destroy her regardless of any passengers aboard. Dernburg claimed that Germany was relieved of any responsibility for the deaths of American citizens aboard because the German Embassy had issued warnings before the sailing, and the 18 February note had declared the existence of "war zones". He referred to the ammunition and military goods declared on Lusitania's manifest and said that "vessels of that kind" could be seized and destroyed under the Hague Rules. (Note: From NY Times & 9 May 1915, p. 4); "Justification of the sinking of the liner Lusitania by German submarines as a man of war was advanced today by Dr Bernhard Dernburg, former German Colonial Secretary and regarded as the Kaiser's official mouthpiece in the United States. Dernburg gave out a statement at the Hollenden Hotel following his arrival in Cleveland to address the City Club at noon on Germany's attitude in the present war." (Note that Dernburg in fact had no official role with the German Embassy.)) Germany adopted a similar official line to "incite public opinion at home" on the advice of Admiral Tirpitz.

In 1913, Churchill had announced that Lusitania would be converted into a warship, "indistinguishable in status and control from men-of-war", if war was declared. However, this was not done. Her cargo had included an estimated 4,200,000 rounds of rifle cartridges, 1,250 empty shell cases, and 18 cases of non-explosive fuses, which were openly listed in her cargo manifest. The day after the sinking, The New York Times published full details of the ship's military cargo. Cunard's assistant manager Herman Winter denied the charge that she carried munitions, but admitted that she was carrying small-arms ammunition, and that she had been carrying such ammunition for years. The fact that Lusitania had been carrying shells and cartridges could not be openly discussed in the British press at the time. Cunard delivered a 27-page additional manifest to U.S. customs four or five days after Lusitania sailed from New York stating that the "empty shells" were in fact 1,248 boxes of filled three-inch shells, four shells to the box, totalling 103,000 pounds or 50 tonnes.

Public opinion was outraged in the United States. The key issue was the savagery in the alleged "German failure to allow passengers to escape on life boats" as required by international law, and Germany's attempts to defend the attack only increased anger. In Germany, many newspapers celebrated the event as a triumph, though allied propaganda at times exaggerated the level of popular support.

The issue was hotly debated within the U.S. government in the weeks following the sinking, and the U.S. and German governments exchanged correspondence. German officials continued to argue that Lusitania was a legitimate military target. German Foreign Minister Von Jagow cited the claims that she was listed as an armed merchant cruiser, she was using neutral flags, and she had been ordered to ram submarines—in contravention of the Cruiser Rules. Von Jagow further alleged that Lusitania had carried munitions and Allied troops on previous voyages. Grand Admiral Alfred von Tirpitz stated that it was sad that many Americans "in wanton recklessness, and in spite of the warnings of our Ambassador, had embarked in this armed cruiser, heavily laden with munitions", but he insisted that Germany had been within her rights to sink the ship.

President Woodrow Wilson saw his main goal as to negotiate an end to the war. He was given contradictory advice. Secretary of State William Jennings Bryan privately advised him that "ships carrying contraband should be prohibited from carrying passengers." However, Counselor Robert Lansing advised Wilson to adhere to the US's prior position of "strict accountability". All that mattered, according to Lansing, was the German responsibility for the safety of the unresisting crew and passengers of the ship. It was confirmed that the ship was not armed and was attacked by surprise, and no justification can allow the violation of "the principles of law and humanity". Wilson adopted Lansing's view, insisting that the German government apologise for the sinking, compensate U.S. victims, and promise to avoid any similar occurrence in the future. Bryan resigned, believing that Wilson's approach compromised American neutrality; he was replaced by Lansing as Secretary of State.

Germany had already declared in February that all allied ships in the area would be sunk, regardless of whether they carried munitions. The strategic aim of Admiral Hugo von Pohl's U-boat campaign was economic warfare against Britain, not the interception of weapons or destruction of war vessels. Germany's concept of "contraband of war" had expanded to include essentially all cargo. Gustav Bachmann had directed on 12 February that enemy passenger vessels should be deliberately targeted, so as to create a "shock effect". There was a fierce debate within Germany, as officials were keenly aware that further sinkings were likely, including ones where Germany's excuses did not apply. Hence secret orders were issued in June that rescinded Bachmann's orders and stated that unrestricted submarine warfare on ocean liners would cease. Tirpitz and Bachmann offered their resignations, but they were rejected by the Kaiser. Yet Germany continued to attack and sink other passenger ships, such as the SS Orduna and RMS Hesperian.

The Germans decided on 9 September 1915 that attacks were only allowed on ships that were definitely British, while neutral ships were to be treated under the Prize Law rules, and no attacks on passenger liners were to be permitted at all. But in January 1917, the German government announced that it would again conduct full unrestricted submarine warfare. This pushed American public opinion over the tipping point, and the United States Congress followed President Wilson to declare war on Germany on 6 April 1917.

After the war, American interests sued the German government for compensation. In 1923, 278 claimants were initially awarded $23 million (equivalent to $340 million in 2025). On 23 February 1924, the Seattle Star reported that Judge Edwin B. Parker denied 40 claims and settled on a final payout of $841,000 ($12.4 million in 2025).

=== 100th commemoration ===
To commemorate the centenary of the sinking, on 3 May 2015 a small fleet of ships sailed from the Isle of Man. Seven fishermen from Man, in their boat The Wanderer, had rescued 150 people from the Lusitania and were awarded medals for their participation. Two of these medals can be seen at the Leece Museum in Peel.

The 100th commemoration of the sinking of the Lusitania was on 7 May 2015. To commemorate the occasion, Cunard's MS Queen Victoria undertook a voyage to Cork, Ireland.

== Wreck ==
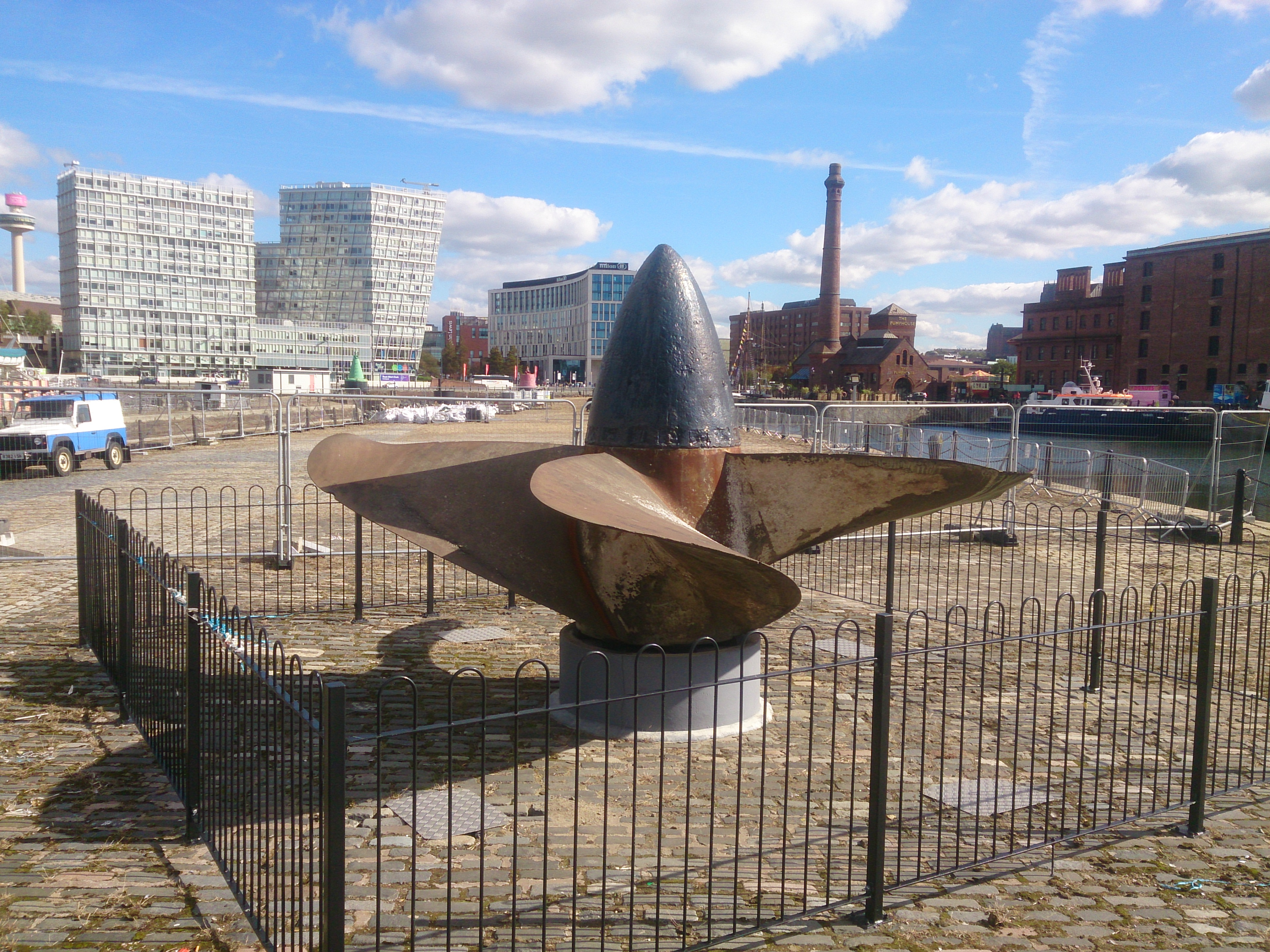
One of the propellers salvaged from the RMS Lusitania, located at Merseyside Maritime Museum in Liverpool

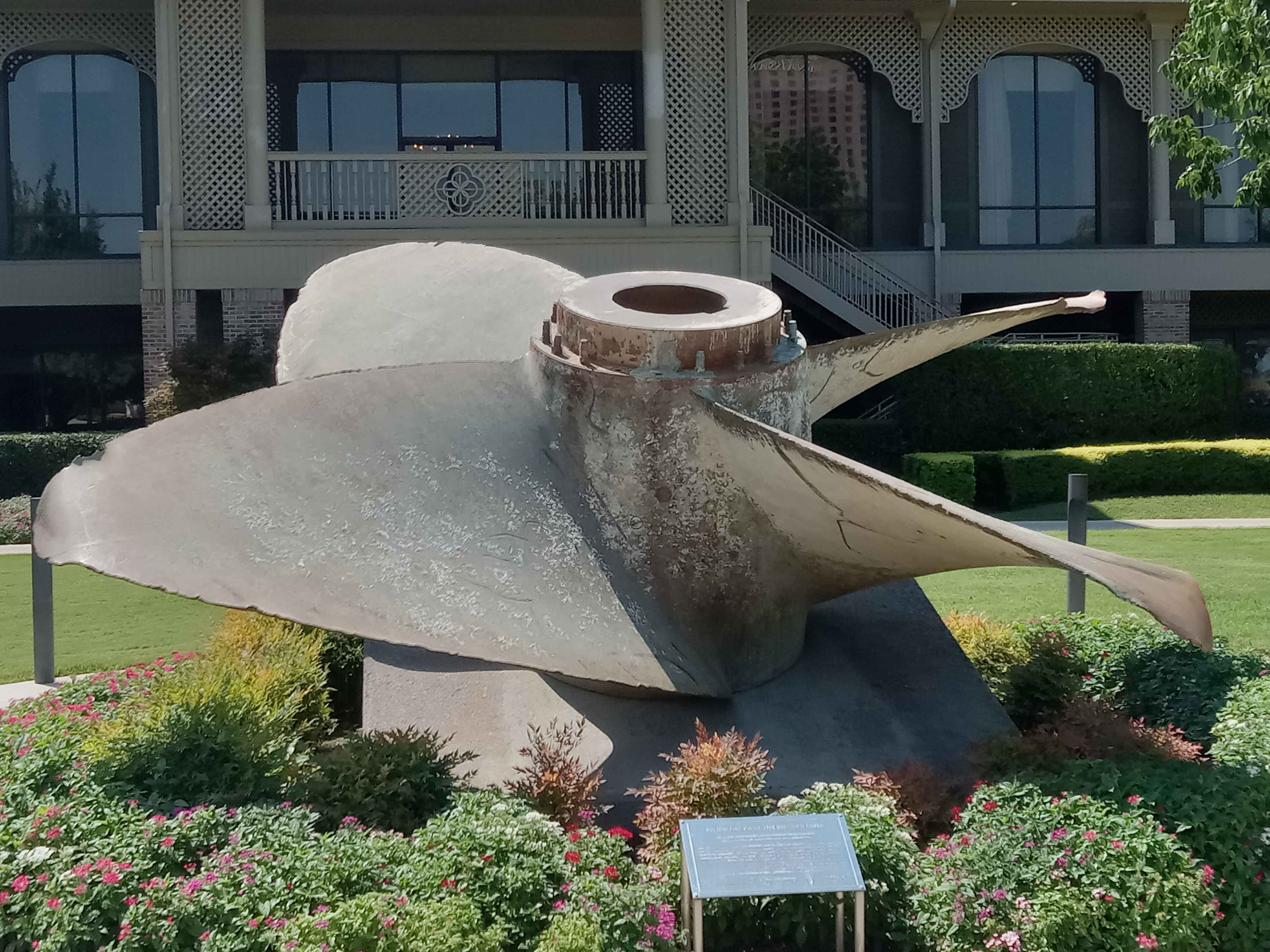
Another one of RMS Lusitania's salvaged propellers located at the Hilton Anatole in Dallas, Texas

The wreck of Lusitania was located on 6 October 1935, 11 miles (18 km) south of the lighthouse at Kinsale. She lies on her starboard side at about a 30-degree angle, in roughly 305 feet (93 m) of water. The wreck is badly collapsed onto its starboard side, due to the force with which it struck the bottom coupled with the forces of winter tides and corrosion in the decades since the sinking. The keel has an "unusual curvature" which may be related to a lack of strength from the loss of its superstructure. The beam is reduced with the funnels missing—presumably due to deterioration.

The bow is the most prominent portion of the wreck with the stern damaged by depth charges. Three of the four propellers were removed by Oceaneering International in 1982 for display, though one was melted down. Expeditions to Lusitania have shown that the ship has deteriorated much faster than Titanic has, being in a depth of 305 feet (93 m) of water. When contrasted with her contemporary, Titanic (resting at a depth of 12,500 feet (3,800 m)), Lusitania appears in a much more deteriorated state due to the presence of fishing nets lying on the wreckage, the blasting of the wreck with depth charges and multiple salvage operations. As a result, the wreck is unstable and may at some point completely collapse. There has been recent academic commentary exploring the possibility of listing the wreck site as a World Heritage Site under the World Heritage Convention, although challenges remain in terms of ownership and preventing further deterioration of the wreck.

=== Simon Lake's attempt to salvage in the 1930s ===
Between 1931 and 1935, an American syndicate comprising Simon Lake, an important submarine inventor, and a US Navy officer, Captain H.H. Railey, negotiated a contract with the Admiralty and other British authorities to partially salvage Lusitania. The means of salvage was unique in that a 200-foot (61 m) steel tube, five feet in diameter, which enclosed stairs, and a dive chamber at the bottom would be floated out over the Lusitania wreck and then sunk upright, with the dive chamber resting on the main deck of Lusitania. Divers would then take the stairs down to the dive chamber and then go out of the chamber to the deck of Lusitania. Lake's primary business goals were to salvage the purser's safe and any items of historical value. It was not to be though, and in Simon Lake's own words, "... but my hands were too full"—i.e. Lake's company was having financial difficulties at the time—and the contract with British authorities expired 31 December 1935 without any salvage work being done, even though his unique salvage tunnel had been built and tested.

=== Argonaut expedition, 1935 ===
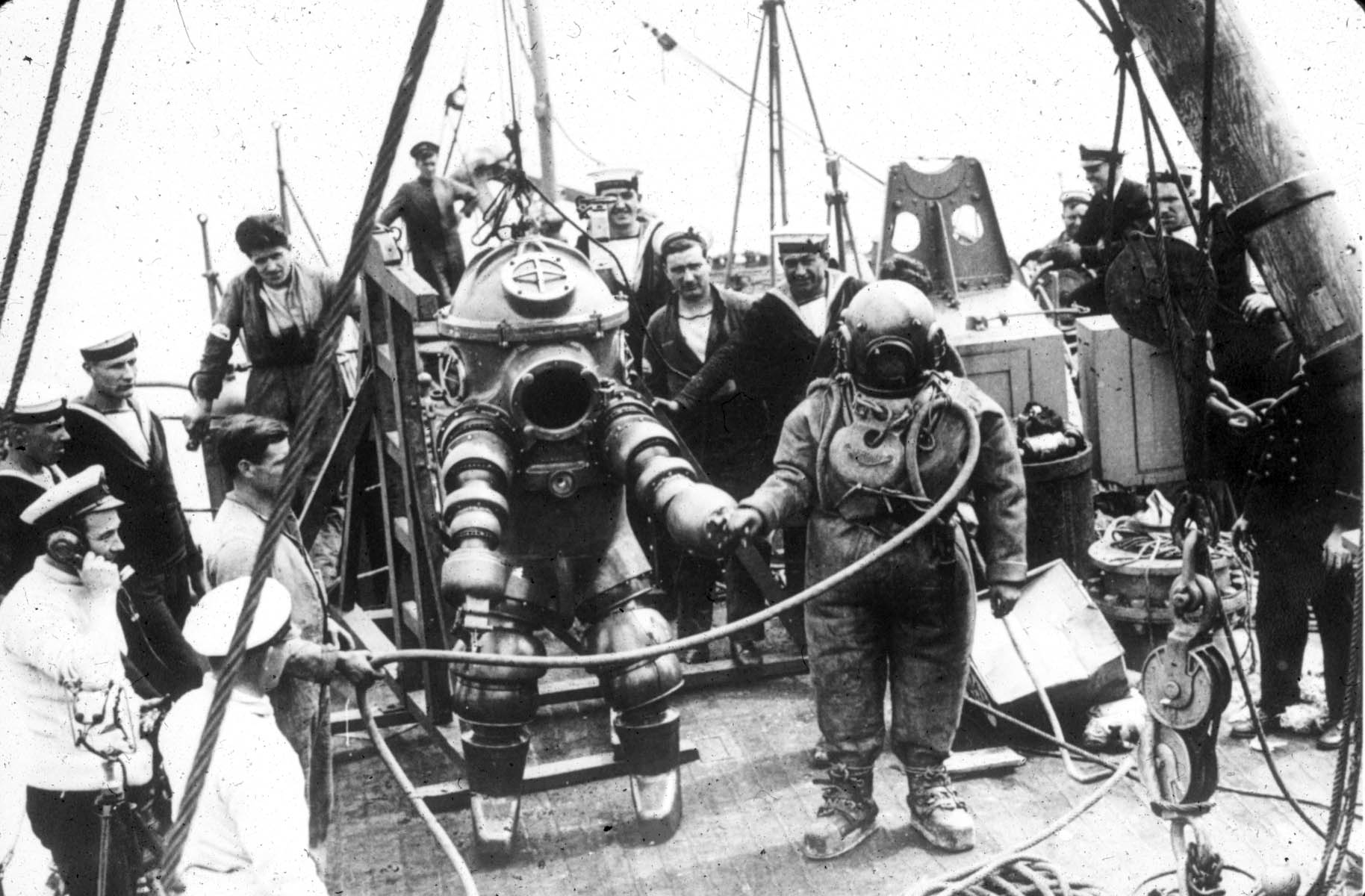
Jim Jarrett wearing the Tritonia diving suit, preparing to explore the wreck of RMS Lusitania, 1935.

In 1935 a Glasgow-based expedition was launched to try to find the wreck of Lusitania. The Argonaut Corporation Ltd was founded and the salvage ship Orphir used to search for the ship. After three months of searching the wreck was discovered on 6 October 1935. Diver Jim Jarrett wore a Tritonia diving suit to explore the wreck at a depth of 93 metres.

=== Gregg Bemis's salvage efforts ===
In 1967, the wreck of Lusitania was sold by the Liverpool & London War Risks Insurance Association to former US Navy diver John Light (1932–1992) for £1,000. American venture capitalist Gregg Bemis (1928–2020) became a co-owner of the wreck in 1968, and by 1982 had bought out his partners to become sole owner. Complex litigation ensued when employees of Bemis brought various artifacts ashore into the UK, with all parties settling their differences apart from the salvors and the British government, which asserted "droits of admiralty" over the recovered items. The judge eventually ruled in The Lusitania, [1986] QB 384, [1986] 1 All ER 1011, that the Crown has no rights over wrecks outside British territorial waters, even if the recovered items are subsequently brought into the United Kingdom. (Note: Section 518 of the Merchant Shipping Act 1894 (57 & 58 Vict. c. 60) had originally applied to wrecks found or taken possession of within UK territorial limits, but section 72 of the Merchant Shipping Act 1906 (6 Edw. 7. c. 48) extended that provision to wrecks later brought into those limits; the court held that as there was no duty on the salvors to bring the wreck into UK waters, the Crown had no rights to wreck, or under the ancient royal prerogative relating to "wreck of the sea throughout the realm, whales and great sturgeons taken in the sea or elsewhere within the realm" (Prerogativa Regis (temp. incert.)).) As of 1998, the case remained the leading authority on this point of law. However, a subsequent US court case where Bemis attempted to stop others from diving the wreck found that Bemis had no ownership over the personal effects and cargo on board the ship.

In 1993, Bemis granted permission to Titanic wreck explorer Robert Ballard to explore the wreck. Ballard attempted to prove that the ship was sunk by the explosion of illegal explosives. The exploration was difficult, hampered by snagged fishing nets and the presence of unexploded depth charges. While the ship was lying on her starboard side and so he was not able to access the area of the torpedo strike, he was able to use ROVs to examine under the bow. He found that the entire exposed area of the cargo hold was "clearly undamaged", concluding that no secondary explosion took place there and that a coal dust explosion was likely responsible instead. Bemis rejected his findings and continued to research the wreck.

Bemis then faced more serious litigation on the issue of artifact recovery occurred versus Ireland. This was because in 1995 the Irish Government declared the Lusitania a heritage site under the National Monuments Act, which prohibited him from in any way interfering with her or her contents. After a protracted legal wrangle, the Supreme Court in Dublin overturned the Arts and Heritage Ministry's previous refusal to issue Bemis with a five-year exploration licence in 2007, ruling that the then minister for Arts and Heritage had misconstrued the law when he refused Bemis's 2001 application. Bemis planned to dive and recover and analyse whatever artefacts and evidence could help piece together the story of what happened to the ship. He said that any items found would be given to museums following analysis. Any fine art recovered—such as the paintings by Rubens, Rembrandt and Monet, among other artists, believed to have been in lead tubes in the possession of Sir Hugh Lane—would remain in the ownership of the Irish Government.

In late July 2008, Bemis was granted an "imaging" licence by the Department of the Environment, which allowed him to photograph and film the entire wreck, and was to allow him to produce the first high-resolution pictures of her. Bemis planned to use the data gathered to assess how fast the wreck was deteriorating and to plan a strategy for a forensic examination of the ship, which he estimated would cost $5m. Florida-based Odyssey Marine Exploration (OME) was contracted by Bemis to conduct the survey. The Department of the Environment's Underwater Archaeology Unit was to join the survey team to ensure that research would be carried out in a non-invasive manner, and a film crew from the Discovery Channel was also to be on hand. A dive team from Cork Sub Aqua Club, diving under licence, discovered 15,000 rounds of the .303 (7.7×56mmR) calibre rifle ammunition transported on Lusitania in boxes in the bow section of the ship. The find was photographed but left in situ under the terms of the licence.

Results from the dives were provided to researchers at the Lawrence Livermore National Laboratory, who in 2012 concluded that this showed that the ship was sunk mainly by the effect of the torpedo, with a secondary explosion due to the boilers that did not significantly affect subsequent events. Bemis rejected the findings.

Continuing to attempt to prove British involvement, in July 2016, Bemis's diving partner Eoin McGarry attempted to recover but lost a telegraph machine from the ship. This caused controversy as the dive was unsupervised by anyone with archaeological expertise. In November 2018, Bemis was interviewed for one hour on live radio about the Lusitania about some of the logistical complications in conducting a maritime archaeological expedition to penetrate the hull. He claimed that some of the original art presumed to be lost in wreckage may not have been, and discussed his continuing belief that Churchill caused the sinking.

In 2020, Bemis died. Despite millions of dollars spent, he was never able to find proof of his conspiracy theory. The wreck is currently owned by a museum in Kinsale, Ireland.

=== Diving accidents ===
A number of technical divers attempting to dive at the Lusitania wreckage site have been seriously injured. Regardless of the unconfirmed presence of secret WWI explosives, mixed gases must be used to reach the wreckage, which purportedly is littered with British depth charges and hedgehog mines, covered in fishing nets, and where sediment limits visibility.

== See also ==
- SS Arabic, another liner sunk soon after
- RMS Hesperian, another liner sunk in 1915 by U-20
- Avis Dolphin, a survivor
- Ian Holbourn, a survivor
- Rita Jolivet, a survivor
- Charles T. Jeffery, a survivor
- Theodate Pope Riddle, a survivor
- List of ships sunk by submarines by death toll
- The Carpet from Bagdad, a mostly lost 1915 film; one reel was recovered from the wreck in 1982

== Bibliography ==
=== Books ===
- Bailey, Thomas A; Ryan, Paul B (1975). The Lusitania Disaster: An Episode in Modern Warfare and Diplomacy. Free Press. ISBN 978-0-02-901240-6.
- Ballard, Robert D; Dunmore, Spencer (1995). Exploring the Lusitania: Probing the Mysteries of the Sinking that Changed History. New York: Warner Books. p. 45. ISBN 978-0-4465-1851-2. Archived from the original on 3 July 2023.
- Beesly, Patrick (1982). Room 40: British Naval Intelligence, 1914–1918. London: Hamish Hamilton. ISBN 0-19281468-0.
- Bishop, Leigh (2003). "Return to Lusitania". Advanced Diver Magazine (13). Archived from the original on 10 May 2015.
- Brune, Lester H (2003). Chronological History of U.S. Foreign Relations: 1607–1932 (2nd ed.). New York: Routledge. p. 365. ISBN 978-0-4159-3915-7. Archived from the original on 3 July 2023.
- Butler, Daniel Allen (2003). The Age of Cunard: A Transatlantic History; 1839–2003. ProStar Publications. ISBN 978-1-57785-348-0. Archived from the original on 3 July 2023.
- Ciment, James D; Russell, Thadeus, eds. (2007). The Home Front Encyclopedia: United States, Britain, and Canada in World Wars I and II. Santa Barbara, Calif.: ABC-CLIO. p. 379. ISBN 978-1-5760-7849-5. Archived from the original on 3 July 2023.
- Carlisle, Rodney P (2009). World War I. Infobase Publishing. p. 73. ISBN 978-1-4381-0889-6. Archived from the original on 3 July 2023.
- Corey, Herbert (1938). Submarine – The Autobiography of Simon Lake (PDF). London: D. Appleton-Century Company. p. 295. Archived from the original on 23 March 2016.
- Craughwell, Thomas J; Kiester, Edwin Jr (2010). The Buck Stops Here: The 28 Toughest Presidential Decisions and How They Changed History. Fair Winds. p. 133. ISBN 978-1-61673-848-8. Archived from the original on 3 July 2023.
- Davidson, Eugene (1997). The Making of Adolf Hitler: The Birth and Rise of Nazism. University of Missouri Press. p. 89. ISBN 978-0-8262-1117-0. Archived from the original on 3 July 2023.
- Denson, John V (2006). A Century of War: Lincoln, Wilson, and Roosevelt. Ludwig von Mises Institute. p. 135. ISBN 978-1-61016-508-2. Archived from the original on 3 July 2023.
- Fox, Stephen (2004). The Ocean Railway: Isambard Kingdom Brunel, Samuel Cunard and the Revolutionary World of the Great Atlantic Steamships. London: HarperCollins. ISBN 978-0-0073-7386-4.
- Gardiner, Robert; Gray, Randal; Budzbon, Przemysław (1985). Conway's All the World's Fighting Ships 1906–1921. Conway. p. 137. ISBN 978-0-85177-245-5.
- Gittelman, Steven H; Gittelman, Emily (2013). Alfred Gwynne Vanderbilt: The Unlikely Hero of the Lusitania. Hamilton Books. p. 199. ISBN 978-0-7618-5507-1. Archived from the original on 3 July 2023.
- Hackett, C; Bedford, JG (1996). The sinking of S.S. Titanic: Investigated by Modern Techniques. Royal Institution of Naval Architects. p. 171.
- Halsey, Francis Whiting (1919). The Literary Digest History of the World War. Funk & Wagnalls. p. 255.
- Hoehling, AA (1996). Last Voyage of the Lusitania. Rowman & Littlefield. p. 27. ISBN 978-1-56833-078-5. Archived from the original on 3 July 2023.
- Jones, Howard (2001). Crucible of Power: A History of U.S. Foreign Relations Since 1897. Rowman & Littlefield. p. 73. ISBN 978-0-8420-2918-6.
- Layton, J. Kent (2010). Lusitania: An Illustrated Biography. Stroud, Gloucestershire: Amberley. ISBN 978-1-84868-834-6.
- Larson, Erik (2015). Dead Wake: The Last Crossing of the Lusitania.
- Lloyd's Register of British & Foreign Shipping. Vol. I.–Steamers. London: Lloyd's Register of Shipping. 1908 – via Internet Archive.
- The Marconi Press Agency Ltd (1913). The Year Book of Wireless Telegraphy and Telephony. London: The St Katherine Press.
- Maxtone-Graham, John (1978). The Only Way to Cross. New York: Macmillan. ISBN 978-0-0258-2350-1. Archived from the original on 3 July 2023.
- Bigham, John (1915). Report of a formal investigation into the circumstances attending the foundering on 7th May, 1915, of the British S.S. 'Lusitania', of Liverpool, being torpedoed off the Old Head of Kinsale, Ireland. Command papers. Vol. Cd.8022 (Session 1914–16, Vol. XXVII, p. 451). London: HMSO.
- Bigham, John (1915). Proceedings in camera on 15th and 18th June, 1915, at the formal investigation into the circumstances attending the foundering, on 7 May, 1915, of the 'Lusitania', after being torpedoed off the Old Head of Kinsale, Ireland. Command papers. Vol. Cd.381 (Session 1919, Vol. XXV, p. 469). London, UK: HMSO.
- Osborne, Richard; Spong, Harry & Grover, Tom (2007). Armed Merchant Cruisers 1878–1945. Windsor, UK: World Warship Society. ISBN 978-0-9543310-8-5.
- Palmer, NE; McKendrick, Ewan (1998). Interests in goods. LLP. p. 379. ISBN 978-1-85978-177-7. Archived from the original on 3 July 2023.
- Paterson, Thomas; Clifford, J Garry; Maddock, Shane J.; Kisatsky, Deborah; Hagan, Kenneth J (2009). American Foreign Relations: A History, Volume 2: Since 1895. Cengage Learning. p. 73. ISBN 978-0-547-22569-2. Archived from the original on 26 May 2016.
- Peeke, Mitch; Jones, Steven & Walsh-Johnson, Kevin (2002). The Lusitania story. Barnsley, Yorkshire: Leo Cooper. ISBN 978-0-85052-902-9.
- Preston, Diana (2002a). Lusitania: An Epic Tragedy. Waterville: Thorndike Press. ISBN 0-80271375-0. Archived from the original on 3 July 2023.
- Preston, Diana (2002b). Wilful Murder: the Sinking of the Lusitania. London: Transworld Publishers Limited. ISBN 0-55299886-9.
- Protasio, John (2011). The Day the World Was Shocked: The Lusitania Disaster and Its Influence on the Course of World War I. Havertown, PA: Casemate. pp. 200–201. ISBN 978-1-9351-4945-3.
- Quinn, Patrick J (2001). The Conning of America: The Great War and American Popular Literature. Rodopi. pp. 54–55. ISBN 978-90-420-1475-6. Archived from the original on 3 July 2023.
- Ramsay, David (2001). Lusitania: Saga and Myth. London: Chatham Publishing. ISBN 978-1-86176-170-5.
- Rea, Tony; Wright, John (1997). International Relations 1914–1995. Oxford University Press. p. 196. ISBN 978-0-19-917167-5.
- Schmidt, Donald E (2005). The Folly of War: American Foreign Policy, 1898–2005. Algora Publishing. p. 71. ISBN 978-0-87586-383-2. Archived from the original on 3 July 2023.
- Sides, Hampton; Goodwin Sides, Anne (January 2009). "Lusitania Rising". Men's Vogue. Archived from the original on 31 May 2009.
- Simpson, Colin (1972). Lusitania. Harmondsworth, UK: Penguin Books. ISBN 0-14-00-3793-4. Archived from the original on 3 July 2023.
- Sondhaus, Lawrence (2011). World War One: The Global Revolution. Cambridge University Press. p. 276. ISBN 978-0-521-51648-8. Archived from the original on 3 July 2023.
- Tucker, Spencer; Roberts, Priscilla Mary (2005). World War One. ABC-CLIO. p. 1146. ISBN 978-1-85109-879-8. Archived from the original on 3 July 2023.
- Venzon, Anne Cipriano; Miles, Paul L. (1995). The United States in the First World War: An Encyclopedia. Garland Pub. p. 357. ISBN 978-0-8153-3353-1. Archived from the original on 3 July 2023.
- Watt, Quintin (ed.). An Illustrated History.
- Zieger, Robert H (1972). America's Great War. Rowman & Littlefield. pp. 24–25. ISBN 978-0-8476-9645-1.

=== Newspapers, journals and other media ===
- Goodwin Sides, Anne (22 November 2008). New Clues in Lusitania's Sinking. National Public Radio.
- Mullally, Erin (January–February 2009). "Lusitania's Secret Cargo". Archaeology. 62 (1). Archaeological Institute of America. Archived from the original on 20 February 2014.
- Rogers, Paul (March–April 2005). "How Deep Is His Love". Stanford Magazine. Stanford Alumni Association. Archived from the original on 11 May 2008.
- Sharrock, David (2 April 2007). "Millionaire diver wins right to explore wreck of the Lusitania". The Times. Archived from the original on 4 June 2011.
- Simpson, Colin (13 October 1972). "Lusitania". Life Magazine. p. 68.
- Shortall, Eithne (20 July 2008). "Riddle of Lusitania sinking may finally be solved". The Times. Archived from the original on 3 June 2010.
- "The Lusitania – A Salvage Project". Evening Post. Wellington, New Zealand. 15 January 1932. Archived from the original on 19 November 2013.
- "Lusitania divers warned of danger from war munitions in 1982, papers reveal". The Guardian. 1 May 2014. Archived from the original on 13 December 2017.
- "Lusitania Treasure to be Raised". Popular Mechanics. 57 (2). Hearst Magazines: 177. February 1932.
- "Sinking justified, says Dr. Dernburg" (PDF). The New York Times. 9 May 1915. Archived (PDF) from the original on 11 November 2020.
- "Lusitania was unarmed" (PDF). New York Times. 10 May 1915. Archived (PDF) from the original on 8 June 2021.
- "The German Submarine Record: Details of Chief Vessels Sunk, With Diplomatic Developments". Current History. 5 (6). University of California Press: 996–1004. March 1917. doi:10.1525/curh.1917.5.6.996. JSTOR 45323616.
- "Germany Asked to Pay for Lusitania". The Seattle Star. Seattle, King, Washington: E.H. Wells & Co. 23 February 1924. p. 16. ISSN 2159-5577. OCLC 17285351.

=== Online ===
- "A Deadly Cargo and the Falsifed Manifests". Lusitania Online: The Home Port of RMS Lusitania. Archived from the original on 24 February 2015.
- "Terror at Sea – Sinking of the Lusitania". Discovery Channel. Archived from the original on 24 March 2009.
- "175 Anniversary cruise - Lusitania Remembered with Martin Bell - 7 nights, May 2015". Cunard Line. Archived from the original on 12 March 2015.
- Doswald-Beck, Louise (31 December 1995). "San Remo Manual on International Law Applicable to Armed Conflict at Sea". International Committee of the Red Cross. Archived from the original on 4 March 2016.
- "Treaty for the Limitation and Reduction of Naval Armaments, (Part IV, Art. 22)" (PDF). International Committee of the Red Cross. 22 April 1930. Archived from the original (PDF) on 6 April 2015.
- Keeling, Drew (2013). "Mass Migration as a Travel Business". business-of-migration.com. Archived from the original on 2 April 2015.
- Layton, J Kent (17 March 2015). "Lusitania Home". Atlantic Liners. Ngaio, Wellington, New Zealand. Archived from the original on 6 August 2020.
- "Testimony of Edward Wilding, Recalled". British Wreck Commissioner's Inquiry. 7 June 1912. Archived from the original on 5 February 2008.
- "Treasure Quest – Lusitania Revealed". Tv.yahoo.com. Archived from the original on 18 May 2009.

Records
Preceded by Deutschland	Holder of the Blue Riband (Westbound record); 1907–1909	Succeeded by Mauretania
Preceded by Kaiser Wilhelm II	Blue Riband (Eastbound record); 1907	Succeeded by Mauretania
