= Social history =

Field of history

Social history, often called history from below, is a field of history that looks at the lived experience of the past. Historians who write social history are called social historians.

Social history came to prominence in the 1960s, spreading from schools of thought in the United Kingdom and France which posited that the Great Man view of history was inaccurate because it did not adequately explain how societies changed. Instead, social historians wanted to show that change arose from within society, complicating the popular belief that powerful leaders were the source of dynamism. While social history came from the Marxist view of history (historical materialism), the cultural turn and linguistic turn saw the number of sub-fields expand as well as the emergence of other approaches to social history, including a social liberal approach and a more ambiguous critical theory approach.

In its "golden age", it was a major field in the 1960s and 1970s among young historians, and still is well represented in history departments in Britain, Canada, France, Germany, and the United States. In the two decades from 1975 to 1995, the proportion of professors of history in American universities identifying with social history rose from 31% to 41%, while the proportion of political historians fell from 40% to 30%. In the history departments of British and Irish universities in 2014, of the 3410 faculty members reporting, 878 (26%) identified themselves with social history while political history came next with 841 (25%).

== "Old" social history ==
There is an important distinction between old social history and new social history, which are now subfields of social history that predate the 1960s. E. P. Thompson identified labour history as the central concern of new social historians because of its " Whiggish narratives", such as the term "labour movement" which, he says, erroneously suggests the constant progression toward the perfect future. The older social history included numerous topics that were not part of mainstream historiography, which was then political, military, diplomatic, constitutional history, the history of great men and intellectual history. It was a hodgepodge without a central theme, and it often included political movements, such as populism, that were "social" in the sense of being outside the elite system.

== The emergence of "new" social history ==
The popular view is that new social history emerged in the 1960s with the publication of Thompson's The Making of the English Working Class (1963). Writing in 1966 in The Times Literary Supplement, Thompson described his approach as "history from below" and explained that it had come from earlier developments within the French Annales School.

According to C. J. Coventry, new social history arose in the 1930s at the University of Cambridge with the Communist Party Historians Group. Citing the reflections of Eric Hobsbawm, a contemporary of Thompson's and a fellow member of the Historians' Group, Coventry shows that the "new" social history popularly associated with Thompson's "history from below" was in fact a conscious revival of historical materialism by young British Marxist intellectuals under the tutelage of the Cambridge economist Maurice Dobb. If so, the foundational text of social history is Karl Marx's The Eighteenth Brumaire of Louis Bonaparte (1852), which is marked by its society-wide approach and consideration of everyday people. It was not until the 1960s, however, that social history gained popularity and scholarship flourished. This was when, according to Thompson, "social history truly came into being, with historians reflecting on their aristocratic and middle-class preoccupations, their veneration of elites (especially Great Men), their Protestant moralising and misanthropic tendencies".

== What is social history? ==
There are many definitions of social history, most of which are confined to national historiographies. The most consequential definition of social history is the one Thompson provided. Thompson saw his "history from below" approach as an attempt to reveal the "social nexus" through which broadscale change occurs. This is reflective of his historical materialism. However, Thompson's 1963 book was disproportionately concerned with the lived experience of forgotten or everyday people. The disparity between a society-wide approach (historical materialism) and the narrower preoccupation with giving voice to the voiceless (justice-seeking) is the basis of present-day confusion about the definition of social history. The confusion arose from Thompson's own inner political turmoil. Staughton Lynd sees Thompson's career as a gradual departure from Marxism, culminating in his last interview, when he declined to describe himself as a Marxist.

Where Thompson had said he did not believe in "theory with a capital T" and Marxism, Lynd shows that Thompson's departure was actually much more gradual, beginning with the 1956 Hungarian Uprising. The highly influential, but confused, definition used by Thompson was not resolved in part because of the cultural turn and the decline of Marxism on the left in the 1970s and 1980s.

=== "History from below" phraseology ===
The popular phrase "history from below", used in social history, first arose in French scholarship before spreading to British scholarship and beyond. Georges Lefebvre first used the phrase "histoire vue d'en bas et non d'en haut" (history seen from below and not from above) in 1932 when praising Albert Mathiez for seeking to tell the "histoire des masses et non de vedettes" (history of the masses and not of starlets). The phrase "people's history" was first used in the title of British historian A. L. Morton's 1938 book, A People's History of England. Yet it was E. P. Thompson's essay History from Below in The Times Literary Supplement (1966), which brought the phrase to the forefront of historiography from the 1970s. Notably, "History From Below" appeared as the title of the Thompson article, put there by an anonymous editor.

The popular phrase has been criticised for implying that social history is overly concerned with the views of insignificant people when it is precisely concerned with how the masses influence events, not just "Great Men". However, society lost its class consciousness in the late 1970s and early 1980s, and social history shed its historical materialism. In the words of Elizabeth Fox-Genovese and Eugene Genovese, post-Marxist social history became concerned with "the bedrooms, bathrooms, and kitchens of each one's favourite victims".

== Social history in national contexts ==
=== British and Irish social history ===
Social history is associated in the United Kingdom with the work of E. P. Thompson in particular, and his studies The Making of the English Working Class and Whigs and Hunters: The Origin of the Black Act. Emerging after the Second World War, it was consciously opposed to traditional history's focus on 'great men', which it counterposed with 'History from below'.

Thus in the UK social history has often had a strong political impetus, and can be contrasted sharply with traditional history's (partial) documentation of the exploits of the powerful, within limited diplomatic and political spheres, and its reliance on archival sources and methods (see historical method and archive) that exclude the voices of less powerful groups within society. Social history has drawn on a much wider range of sources and methods than traditional history and source criticism, gaining a broader view of the past. Methods have often included quantitative data analysis and, importantly, oral history, which creates an opportunity to glean perspectives and experiences of people within society who are unlikely to be documented in archives. Eric Hobsbawm was an important UK social historian who produced an extensive social history of the UK and also wrote on the theory and politics of UK social history. Hobsbawm and E. P. Thompson were both involved in the pioneering History Workshop Journal and Past & Present.

Ireland has its own historiography.

=== American social history ===
In United States historiography, history from below is referred to as "history from the bottom up". It is called "people's history", associated in popular consciousness with Howard Zinn and his 1980 book A People's History of the United States. Charles Tilly argues the tasks of the social historian are 1) "documenting large structural changes; 2) reconstructing the experiences of ordinary people in the course of those changes; and (3) connecting the two".

The intellectual foundations of the "history from below" approach were further shaped by post–World War II developments. During the Cold War years, historians increasingly adopted quantitative methods, applying social-scientific models to the study of voter behavior, social mobility, and economic trends. This era witnessed the rise of the so-called "social science history", which sought to render historical inquiry systematic and analytical. Within this context, the proponents of the "New Economic History" (Cliometrics), such as Robert Fogel and Douglass North, employed mathematical models and economic data to reinterpret major historical processes. However, this approach was criticized for reducing complex human experiences to numerical expressions. The founding of the Social Science History Association in 1976 marked a decisive institutionalization of this methodological orientation.

Americanist Paul E. Johnson recalls the heady early promise of the movement in the late 1960s:

The New Social History reached UCLA at about that time, and I was trained as a quantitative social science historian. I learned that "literary" evidence and the kinds of history that could be written from it were inherently elitist and untrustworthy. Our cousins, the Annalistes, talked of ignoring heroes and events and reconstructing the more constitutive and enduring "background" of history. Such history could be made only with quantifiable sources. The result would be a "History from the Bottom Up" that ultimately engulfed traditional history and, somehow, helped to make a Better World. Much of this was acted out with mad-scientist bravado. One well-known quantifier said that anyone who did not know statistics at least through multiple regression should not hold a job in a history department. My own advisor told us that he wanted history to become "a predictive social science." I never went that far. I was drawn to the new social history by its democratic inclusiveness as much as by its system and precision. I wanted to write the history of ordinary people—to historicize them, put them into the social structures and long-term trends that shaped their lives, and at the same time resurrect what they said and did. In the late 1960s, quantitative social history looked like the best way to do that.

The Social Science History Association was formed in 1976 to bring together scholars from numerous disciplines interested in social history. It is still active and publishes Social Science History quarterly. The field is also the specialty of the Journal of Social History, edited since 1967 by Peter Stearns It covers such topics as gender relations, race in American history, the history of personal relationships, consumerism, sexuality, the social history of politics, crime and punishment, and the history of the senses. Most major historical journals also have coverage.

From the 1960s onward, social history expanded its scope beyond structural and economic analyses to include questions of identity and culture. The civil rights movement, second-wave feminism, and the Vietnam War prompted historians to reconsider grand narratives and to focus instead on the everyday experiences of marginalized groups. Analytical categories such as gender, race, ethnicity, and lifestyle emerged as central to historical inquiry. W. E. B. Du Bois's Black Reconstruction in America (1935) was rediscovered as a pioneering work in this regard. By the 1980s, the "linguistic turn" and postmodern debates had drawn attention to the narrative and discursive dimensions of history. Scholars such as Joan Scott and William Sewell emphasized the constitutive role of language and discourse in shaping social reality.

However, after 1990, social history was increasingly challenged by cultural history, which emphasizes language, beliefs, and assumptions, and their causal role in group behavior.

=== France ===
Social history has dominated French historiography since the 1920s, thanks to the central role of the Annales School. Its journal, Annales, focuses on the synthesis of historical patterns identified through social, economic, and cultural history, statistics, medical reports, family studies, and even psychoanalysis.

=== Germany ===
Social history developed within the West German discipline of history during the 1950s-60s as the successor to national history, which was discredited in the aftermath of National Socialism. The German brand of the "history of society" or Alltagsgeschichte – Gesellschaftsgeschichte – has been known since its emergence in the 1960s for applying sociological and political modernization theories to German history. Modernization theory was presented by Hans-Ulrich Wehler (1931–2014) and his Bielefeld School as the way to transform "traditional" German history, that is, national political history, centered on a few "great men," into an integrated and comparative history of German society encompassing societal structures outside politics. Wehler drew upon the modernization theory of Max Weber and concepts from Karl Marx, Otto Hintze, Gustav Schmoller, Werner Sombart and Thorstein Veblen.

In the 1970s and early 1980s, German historians of society, led by Wehler and Jürgen Kocka of the "Bielefeld School", gained dominance in Germany by applying both modernization theories and social science methods. From the 1980s, however, they were increasingly criticized by proponents of the "cultural turn" for failing to incorporate culture into the history of society, for reducing politics to society, and for reducing individuals to structures. Historians of society inverted the traditional positions they criticized (analogously with Marx's inversion of Hegel). As a result, the problems inherent in the positions criticized were not resolved but were turned on their heads. The traditional focus on individuals was inverted into a modern focus on structures; the traditional focus on culture was inverted into a modern focus on structures; and traditional emphatic understanding was inverted into modern causal explanation.

Jürgen Kocka finds two meanings to "social history." At the simplest level, it was the subdivision of history that focused on social structures and processes. In that regard, it stood in contrast to political or economic history. The second meaning was broader, and the Germans called it Gesellschaftsgeschichte. It is the history of an entire society from a social-historical viewpoint. The English historian G. M. Trevelyan saw it as the bridging point between economic and political history, reflecting that, "[w]ithout social history, economic history is barren and political history unintelligible." While the field has often been viewed negatively as history with the politics left out, it has also been defended as "history with the people put back in."

In Germany, the Gesellschaftsgeschichte movement introduced a vast range of topics, as Kocka, a leader of the Bielefeld School recalls:

In the 1960s and 1970s, "social history" caught the imagination of a young generation of historians. It became a central concept – and a rallying point – of historical revisionism. It meant many things at the same time. It gave priority to the study of particular kinds of phenomena, such as classes and movements, urbanization and industrialization, family and education, work and leisure, mobility, inequality, conflicts and revolutions. It stressed structures and processes over actors and events. It emphasized analytical approaches close to the social sciences rather than by the traditional methods of historical hermeneutics. Social historians frequently sympathized with the causes (as they saw them) of the "little people", the underdog, popular movements, or the working class. Social history was both demanded and rejected as a vigorous revisionist alternative to the more established modes of history studies, in which the reconstruction of politics and ideas, the history of events and hermeneutic methods traditionally dominated.

=== Hungarian social history ===
Before World War II, political history was in decline, and an effort was made to introduce social history in the style of the French Annales School. After the war, only Marxist interpretations were allowed. With the end of Communism in Hungary in 1989. Marxist historiography collapsed, and social history came into its own, especially in the study of demographic patterns in the early modern period. Research priorities have shifted toward urban history and the conditions of everyday life.

=== Soviet Union and social history ===
When the Soviet Union dissolved in 1991, large parts of the Soviet archives were opened. The historians' database leaped from a limited range of sources to a vast array of records created by modern bureaucracies. Social history flourished.

=== Canadian social history ===
Social history had a "golden age" in Canada in the 1970s, and continues to flourish among scholars. Its strengths include demography, women's studies, labour studies, and urban studies.

=== Social history of Africa ===
Events of Africa's general social history since the twentieth century refer to the colonial era for most of the countries with the exception of Ethiopia and Liberia, which were never colonized. Major processes in the continent involve resistance, independence, reconstruction, self-rule, and the process of modern politics including the formation of the African Union. Post-colonial milestones towards stability, economic growth, and unity have been made with continuous developments. Natural phenomena and subsequent economic effects have been more pronounced, for example in Ethiopia, followed by ethnic-based social crises and violence in the twenty-first century — that led to the mass migration of youth and skilled workers. Political and economic stability with respect to measures taken by international donor groups such as sanctions and subsequent responses from various nationals to such measures and Pan-Africanism are other dimensions of Africa's social history.

=== Australian social history ===
In Australia, social history took on a non-Marxist focus on revealing the lives of people whom earlier generations of historians had previously neglected. The two most significant social historians of Australian historiography, Ann Curthoys and Humphrey McQueen, have both identified a lack of interest in social history among scholars compared with other national historiographies and a general non-Marxist, a-theoretical approach to social history among Australian social historians. Scholars generally see the first application of social history as McQueen's A New Britannia (1970). However, some believe Russel Ward's The Australian Legend (1958) may have been a prototype for the new social history.

== Subfields ==
=== Historical demography ===
The study of the lives of ordinary people was revolutionized in the 1960s by the introduction of sophisticated quantitative and demographic methods, often using individual data from the census and from local registers of births, marriages, deaths, and taxes, as well as theoretical models from sociology such as social mobility. H-DEMOG is a daily email discussion group that covers the field broadly.

Historical demography is the study of population history and demographic processes, typically using census data or similar statistical sources. It became an important specialty within social history, with strong connections with the larger field of demography, as in the study of the Demographic Transition.

=== African-American history ===
Black history or African-American history studies African Americans and Africans in American history. The Association for the Study of African American Life and History was founded by Carter G. Woodson in 1915 and has 2500 members and publishes the Journal of African American History, formerly the Journal of Negro History. Since 1926 it has sponsored Black History Month every February.

=== Ethnic history ===
Ethnic history is especially important in the US and Canada, where major encyclopedias helped define the field. It covers the history of ethnic groups (usually not including Black or Native Americans). Typical approaches include critical ethnic studies, comparative ethnic studies, critical race studies, Asian American studies, and Latino/a or Chicano/a studies. In recent years, Chicano/Chicana studies has become important as the Hispanic population has become the largest minority in the US.

- The Immigration and Ethnic History Society was formed in 1976 and publishes a journal for libraries and its 829 members.
- The American Conference for Irish Studies, founded in 1960, has 1,700 members and has occasional publications but no journal.
- The American Italian Historical Association was founded in 1966 and has 400 members; it does not publish a journal
- The American Jewish Historical Society is the oldest ethnic society, founded in 1892; it has 3,300 members and publishes American Jewish History
- The Polish American Historical Association was founded in 1942, and publishes a newsletter and Polish American Studies, an interdisciplinary, refereed scholarly journal twice each year.
- H-ETHNIC is a daily discussion list founded in 1993 with 1400 members; it covers topics of ethnicity and migration globally.
- The Association for the Study of African American Life and History founded on 9 September 1915, publishes the Journal of African American History, Black History Bulletin and the Woodson Review
- The Afro-American Historical and Genealogical Society was founded in May 1977, publishes the Journal of the Afro-American Historical and Genealogical Society.

=== Labor history ===
Labor history deals with labor unions and the social history of workers. See, for example, Labor history of the United States. The Study Group on International Labor and Working-Class History was established in 1971 and has a membership of 1000. It publishes International Labor and Working-Class History. H-LABOR is a daily email-based discussion group formed in 1993 that reaches over a thousand scholars and advanced students. the Labor and Working-Class History Association formed in 1988 and publishes Labor: Studies in Working-Class History.

Kirk (2010) surveys labour historiography in Britain since the formation of the Society for the Study of Labour History in 1960. He reports that labour history has been mostly pragmatic, eclectic, and empirical; it has played an important role in historiographical debates, including those revolving around history from below, institutionalism versus the social history of labor, class, populism, gender, language, postmodernism, and the turn to politics. Kirk rejects suggestions that the field is in decline and emphasizes its innovation, adaptation, and renewal. Kirk also detects a move into conservative insularity and academicism. He recommends a more extensive and critical engagement with the kinds of comparative, transnational, and global concerns that are increasingly popular among labour historians elsewhere; he calls for a revival of public and political interest in these topics. Meanwhile, Navickas, (2011) examines recent scholarship including the histories of collective action, environment and human ecology, and gender issues, with a focus on work by James Epstein, Malcolm Chase, and Peter Jones.

=== Women's history ===
Women's history exploded into prominence in the 1970s, and is now well represented in every geographical topic; increasingly it includes gender history. Social history uses the approach of women's history to understand the experiences of ordinary women, as opposed to "Great Women," in the past. Feminist women's historians such as Joan Kelly have critiqued early studies of social history for being too focused on the male experience.

=== Gender history ===
Gender history focuses on the categories, discourses, and experiences of femininity and masculinity as they develop over time. Gender history gained prominence after Joan W. Scott conceptualized it in 1986 in her article "Gender: A Useful Category of Historical Analysis." Many social historians use Scott's concept of "perceived differences" to study how gender relations in the past have unfolded and continue to unfold. In keeping with the cultural turn, many social historians are also gender historians who study how discourses interact with everyday experiences.

=== History of the family ===
The history of the family emerged as a separate field in the 1970s, with close ties to anthropology and sociology. The trend was especially pronounced in the US and Canada. It emphasizes demographic patterns and public policy, but is quite separate from genealogy, though often drawing on the same primary sources, such as censuses and family records.

The influential pioneering study Women, Work, and Family (1978) was done by Louise A. Tilly and Joan W. Scott. It broke new ground with its broad interpretive framework and emphasis on the variable factors shaping women's place in the family and economy in France and England. The study considered the interaction between production, or traditional labor, and reproduction, the work of caring for children and families, in its analysis of women's wage labor, thus helping to bring together labor and family history. Much work has been done on the dichotomy in women's lives between the private sphere and the public. For a recent worldwide overview covering 7000 years, see Maynes and Waltner's 2012 book and ebook, The Family: A World History (2012). For comprehensive coverage of the American case, see Marilyn Coleman and Lawrence Ganong, eds. The Social History of the American Family: An Encyclopedia (4 vol, 2014).

The history of childhood is a growing subfield.

=== History of education ===
For much of the 20th century, the dominant American historiography, as exemplified by Ellwood Patterson Cubberley (1868–1941) at Stanford, emphasized the rise of American education as a powerful force for literacy, democracy, and equal opportunity, and a firm basis for higher education and advanced research institutions. It was a story of enlightenment and modernization triumphing over ignorance, cost-cutting, and narrow traditionalism, whereby parents tried to block their children's intellectual access to the wider world. Teachers dedicated to the public interest, reformers with a wide vision, and public support from the civic-minded community were the heroes. The textbooks help inspire students to become public school teachers, thereby fulfilling their own civic mission.

The crisis came in the 1960s, when a new generation of New Left scholars and students rejected the traditional celebratory accounts, and identified the educational system as the villain for many of America's weaknesses, failures, and crimes. Michael Katz (1939–2014) states they:

tried to explain the origins of the Vietnam War; the persistence of racism and segregation; the distribution of power among gender and classes; intractable poverty and the decay of cities; and the failure of social institutions and policies designed to deal with mental illness, crime, delinquency, and education.

The old guard fought back in bitter historiographical contests, with younger students and scholars largely arguing that schools were not the solution to America's ills; they were, in part, the cause of Americans' problems. The fierce battles of the 1960s died out by the 1990s, but enrollment in education history courses never recovered.

By the 1980s, a compromise had been reached, with all sides focusing on the highly bureaucratic nature of American public schooling.

In recent years most histories of education deal with institutions or focus on the ideas histories of major reformers, but a new social history has recently emerged, focused on who were the students in terms of social background and social mobility. In the US, attention has often focused on minority and ethnic students. In Britain, Raftery et al. (2007) examine the historiography of social change and education in Ireland, Scotland, and Wales, with particular reference to 19th-century schooling. They developed distinctive systems of schooling in the 19th century that reflected not only their relationship to England but also significant contemporaneous economic and social change. This article seeks to lay a basis for comparative work by identifying research on this period, offering brief analytical commentaries on key works, discussing developments in educational historiography, and pointing to lacunae in the research.

Historians have recently looked at the relationship between schooling and urban growth by studying educational institutions as agents in class formation, relating urban schooling to changes in the shape of cities, linking urbanization with social reform movements, and examining the material conditions affecting child life and the relationship between schools and other agencies that socialize the young.

The most economics-minded historians have sought to relate education to changes in labor quality, productivity, and economic growth, as well as to the rates of return on education investment. A major recent exemplar is Claudia Goldin and Lawrence F. Katz, The Race between Education and Technology (2009), on the social and economic history of 20th-century American schooling.

=== Urban history ===
The "new urban history" emerged in the 1950s in Britain and in the 1960s in the US. It examined the "city as process" and, often using quantitative methods, sought to learn more about the inarticulate masses in cities rather than mayors and elites. A major early study was Stephan Thernstrom's Poverty and Progress: Social Mobility in a Nineteenth Century City (1964), which used census records to study Newburyport, Massachusetts, 1850–1880. A seminal, landmark book, it sparked interest in the 1960s and 1970s in quantitative methods, census sources, "bottom-up" history, and the measurement of upward social mobility by different ethnic groups. Other exemplars of the new urban history included Kathleen Conzen, Immigrant Milwaukee, 1836-1860 (1976); Alan Dawley, Class and Community: The Industrial Revolution in Lynn (1975; 2nd ed. 2000); Michael B. Katz, The People of Hamilton, Canada West (1976); Eric H. Monkkonen, The Dangerous Class: Crime and Poverty in Columbus Ohio 1860-1865 (1975); and Michael P. Weber, Social Change in an Industrial Town: Patterns of Progress in Warren, Pennsylvania, From Civil War to World War I. (1976).

Representative comparative studies include Leonardo Benevolo, The European City (1993); Christopher R. Friedrichs, The Early Modern City, 1450-1750 (1995), and James L. McClain, John M. Merriman, and Ugawa Kaoru. eds. Edo and Paris (1994) (Edo was the old name for Tokyo).

No overarching social history theories emerged to explain urban development. Inspiration from urban geography and sociology, as well as a concern with workers (as opposed to labor union leaders), families, ethnic groups, racial segregation, and women's roles, has proven useful. Historians now view the contending groups within the city as "agents" who shape the direction of urbanization. The subfield has flourished in Australia, where most people live in cities.

=== Rural history ===
Agricultural history handles the economic and technological dimensions, while rural history handles the social dimension. Burchardt (2007) evaluates the state of modern English rural history and identifies an "orthodox" school, focused on the economic history of agriculture. This historiography has made impressive progress in quantifying and explaining the output and productivity achievements of English farming since the "agricultural revolution." The celebratory style of the orthodox school was challenged by a dissident tradition emphasizing the social costs of agricultural progress, notably enclosure, which removed much common resource and led to riots for some 300 years. Recently, a new school associated with the journal Rural History has broken away from this narrative of agricultural change, elaborating a broader social history. The work of Alun Howkins has been pivotal in recent historiography regarding these three traditions.

Howkins, like his precursors, is constrained by an increasingly anachronistic equation of the countryside with agriculture. Geographers and sociologists have developed a concept of a "post-productivist" countryside, dominated by consumption and representation that may have something to offer historians, in conjunction with the well-established historiography of the "rural idyll." Most American rural history has focused on the Southern United States—overwhelmingly rural until the 1950s, but there is a "new rural history" of the North as well. Instead of becoming agrarian capitalists, farmers held onto preindustrial capitalist values, emphasizing family and community. Rural areas maintained population stability; kinship ties determined rural immigrant settlement and community structures; and the defeminization of farm work encouraged the rural version of the "women's sphere." These findings strongly contrast with those in the old frontier history and those in the new urban history.

=== Religion ===
The historiography of religion focuses mostly on theology, church organization, and development. Recently, the study of social history, religious behavior, and belief has become important.

== Political history ==
While the study of elites and political institutions has produced a vast body of scholarship, social historians after 1960 have shifted the emphasis to the politics of ordinary people—especially voters and collective movements. Political historians responded with the "new political history," which has shifted attention to political cultures. Some scholars have recently applied a cultural approach to political history. Some political historians complain that social historians are likely to put too much stress on the dimensions of class, gender, and race, reflecting a leftist political agenda that assumes outsiders in politics are more interesting than the actual decision makers.

Social history, with its leftist political origins, initially sought to link state power to everyday experience in the 1960s. Yet by the 1970s, social historians increasingly excluded analyses of state power from their focus. Social historians have recently engaged with political history through studies of the relationships between state formation, power and everyday life with the theoretical tools of cultural hegemony and governmentality.

== See also ==
- Cultural studies
- Dig Where You Stand movement
- History of sociology
- List of history journals
- Living history and open-air museums
- Oral History
- People's History

=== Practitioners ===
- Salo Baron (1895–1989), Jewish history
- Marc Bloch (1886–1944), Medieval, Annales School
- Asa Briggs, Baron Briggs, (1921 - 2018) British
- Martin Broszat (1926–1989), Germany
- C. J. Coventry (b. 1991), Australian, transnational history
- Ann Curthoys (b. 1945), Australian, transnational, women's history
- Merle Curti (1897–1997) American
- Natalie Zemon Davis, (1928-2023) France
- Herbert Gutman (1928–1985), American black and labor history
- Eugene D. Genovese (1930–2012), American slavery
- S. D. Goitein (1900–1985), Medieval Jewish history in Fustat and environs
- Oscar Handlin (1915–2011), American ethnic
- Eric Hobsbawm (1917–2012), labor history, social movements, and resistances
- Emmanuel Le Roy Ladurie (b. 1929), leader of Annales School, France
- Sven Lindqvist (1932–2019), Sweden
- Staughton Lynd (1929–2022) American
- Humphrey McQueen (b. 1942) Australian, transnational history
- Ram Sharan Sharma (1919–2011), India
- Stephan Thernstrom (b. 1934), ethnic American; social mobility
- Charles Tilly (1929 – 2008), European; theory
- Louise A. Tilly (1930 - 2018), Europe; women and family
- E. P. Thompson (1924–1993), British labour
- Hans-Ulrich Wehler (1931–2014), 19th-century Germany, Bielefeld School

== Bibliography ==
- Adas, Michael. "Social History and the Revolution in African and Asian Historiography," Journal of Social History 19 (1985): 335–378.
- Anderson, Michael. Approaches to the History of the Western Family 1500-1914 (1995) 104pp excerpt and text search
- Cabrera, Miguel A. Postsocial History: An Introduction. (2004). 163 pp.
- Cayton, Mary Kupiec, Elliott J. Gorn, and Peter W. Williams, eds. Encyclopedia of American Social History (3 vol 1993) 2653pp; long articles pages by leading scholars; see v I: Part II, Methods and Contexts, pp 235–434
- Cross, Michael S. "Social History," Canadian Encyclopedia (2008) online
- Cross, Michael S. and Kealey, Gregory S., eds. Readings in Canadian Social History (5 vol 1984). 243 pp.
- Dewald, Jonathan. Lost Worlds: The Emergence of French Social History, 1815-1970. (2006). 241 pp.
- Eley, Geoff. A Crooked Line: From Cultural History to the History of Society. (2005). 301 pp.
- Fairburn, Miles. Social History: Problems, Strategies and Methods. (1999). 325 pp.
- Fass, Paula, ed. Encyclopedia of Children and Childhood: In History and Society, (3 vols. 2003).
- Fletcher, Roger. "Recent Developments in West German Historiography: the Bielefeld School and its Critics." German Studies Review 1984 7(3): 451–480. ISSN 0149-7952 Fulltext: in Jstor
- Hareven, Tamara K. "The History of the Family and the Complexity of Social Change," American Historical Review, (1991) 96#1 pp 95–124 in JSTOR
- Harte, N. B. "Trends in publications on the economic and social history of Great Britain and Ireland, 1925-74." Economic History Review 30.1 (1977): 20–41. online
- Henretta, James. "Social History as Lived and Written," American Historical Review 84 (1979): 1293-1323 in JSTOR
- Himmelfarb, Gertrude. "The Writing of Social History: Recent Studies of 19th Century England." Journal of British Studies 11.1 pp. 148–170. online
- Kanner, Barbara. Women in English Social History, 1800-1914: A Guide to Research (2 vol 1988–1990). 871 pp.
- Lloyd, Christopher. Explanation in Social History. (1986). 375 pp.
- Lorenz, Chris. "'Won't You Tell Me, Where Have All the Good Times Gone'? On the Advantages and Disadvantages of Modernization Theory for History." Rethinking History 2006 10(2): 171–200. ISSN 1364-2529 Fulltext: Ebsco
- Mintz, Steven. Huck's Raft: A History of American Childhood (2006). excerpt and text search
- Mintz, Steven, and Susan Kellogg. Domestic Revolutions: A Social History Of American Family Life (1989) excerpt and text search
- Mosley, Stephen. "Common Ground: Integrating Social and Environmental History," Journal of Social History, Volume 39, Number 3, Spring 2006, pp. 915–933, relations with Environmental History, in Project MUSE
- Muehlbauer, Matthew S., and David J. Ulbrich, eds. The Routledge History of Global War and Society (2018)
- Myhre, Jan Eivind. "Social History in Norway in the 1970s and Beyond: Evolution and Professionalisation." Contemporary European History 28.3 (2019): 409-421 online
- Palmer, Bryan D., and Todd McCallum, "Working-Class History" Canadian Encyclopedia (2008)
- Pomeranz, Kenneth. "Social History and World History: from Daily Life to Patterns of Change." Journal of World History 2007 18(1): 69–98. ISSN 1045-6007 Fulltext: in History Cooperative and Project MUSE
- Stearns, Peter N. "Social History Today ... And Tomorrow," Journal of Social History 10 (1976): 129–155.
- Stearns, Peter N. (2003). "Social History Present and Future". Journal of Social History. 37 (1): 9+. Archived from the original on 2011-06-05 – via Questia.
- Stearns, Peter, ed. Encyclopedia of Social History (1994) 856 pp.
- Stearns, Peter, ed. Encyclopedia of European Social History from 1350 to 2000 (5 vol 2000), 209 essays by leading scholars in 3000 pp.
- Sutherland, Neil. "Childhood, History of," Canadian Encyclopedia (2008)
- Hobsbawm, Eric. The Age of Revolution: Europe 1789-1848.
- Skocpol, Theda, and Daniel Chirot, eds. Vision and method in historical sociology (1984).
- Thompson, E. P. The Essential E. P. Thompson. (2001). 512 pp., highly influential British historian of the working class
- Thompson, F. M. L., ed. The Cambridge Social History of Britain, 1750-1950. Vol. 1: Regions and Communities. Vol. 2: People and Their Environment; Vol. 3: Social Agencies and Institutions. (1990). 492 pp.
- Tilly, Charles. "The Old New Social History and the New Old Social History," Review 7 (3), Winter 1984: 363-406 (online)
- Tilly, Charles. Big Structures, Large Processes, Huge Comparisons (1984).
- Timmins, Geoffrey. "The Future of Learning and Teaching in Social History: the Research Approach and Employability." Journal of Social History 2006 39(3): 829-842. ISSN 0022-4529 Fulltext: History Cooperative and Project MUSE
- Wilson, Adrian, ed. Rethinking Social History: English Society, 1570-1920 and Its Interpretation. (1993). 342 pp.
- Zunz, Olivier, ed. Reliving the Past: The Worlds of Social History, (1985) online edition

=== Primary sources ===
- Binder, Frederick M. and David M. Reimers, eds. The Way We Lived: Essays and Documents in American Social History. (2000). 313 pp.
