= Exterminate all the Brutes =

Exterminate all the Brutes may refer to:

- A phrase from the character Kurtz in the novel Heart of Darkness by Joseph Conrad
- Exterminate All the Brutes (book), a book by Sven Lindqvist
  - Exterminate All the Brutes (miniseries), a miniseries based on the book
