= Moral Minefields: How Sociologists Debate Good Science =

2023 book Shai M. Dromi and Samuel D. Stabler

- Cover
- Author: Shai M. Dromi and Samuel D. Stabler
- Language: English
- Subject: Morality and knowledge production in sociology, religion, cosmopolitanism, race, demography, moral critiques, and sociological innovation
- Publisher: University of Chicago Press
- Publication date: August 2023
- Media type: Print, digital
- ISBN: 978-0-226-82816-9

Moral Minefields: How Sociologists Debate Good Science is a 2023 book by sociologists Shai M. Dromi and Samuel D. Stabler, published by the University of Chicago Press. Focusing on five recent controversies within the discipline, it shows how moral debates shape sociological research and spur innovative scholarly approaches. The book received honorable mentions for the ASA Section on Altruism, Morality, and Social Solidarity's Outstanding Published Book Award and the Robert K. Merton Award from the American Sociological Association's Science, Knowledge, and Technology section.

== Background ==
In an interview, Dromi and Stabler emphasized how the book explored a range of "moral repertoires" that sociologists used to evaluate research and highlighted how controversy often spurred new lines of inquiry. They claimed that multiple visions of good sociology coexist, without implying total relativism. They described how disputes over methodological rigor, ethical commitments to research subjects, or interdisciplinary engagement reflected deeper disagreements about what the discipline should accomplish, and detailed how these conflicts sometimes spanned decades or flared up anew with changing funding priorities. They noted that acknowledging a plurality of moral frameworks encouraged healthy tension rather than chaos, since competing views of worth and relevance kept scholars accountable and fostered innovative scholarship. They also explained how navigating this moral minefield results in both constraints on certain research and the emergence of fresh, collaborative approaches.

== Overview ==
Dromi and Stabler study how sociologists handle moral criticism of their research and how such debates influence the field's development. The authors outline the concept of "moral repertoires," suggesting that sociologists use various shared frameworks to justify or challenge academic work, rather than relying on a single, universal definition of good research. In the preface and introduction, they position these debates as part of an ongoing conversation about sociology's role in promoting social well-being and guiding ethical inquiry.

The first chapter details how researchers navigate contentious areas by drawing on these moral repertoires to either endorse, refine, or circumvent disputed subjects. In the following chapters, the book discusses how certain fields—such as studies of race and genetics, cultural explanations of poverty, or research on nationalism—have been deemed off-limits or in need of reframing, and how scholars nonetheless persist, reorganize their approaches, and sometimes bridge apparently irreconcilable positions. Later, the authors address family research, where questions about breastfeeding spark disagreements over methodology, ethics, and social implications. In the conclusion and afterword, they argue that moral pluralism within sociology fosters innovation and keeps critical reflection at the heart of the discipline, allowing researchers to continually revisit how they define—and defend—the social good.

== Reviews ==
The book sparked considerable discussion among sociologists about the ways morality shapes knowledge production within their discipline. Stephen Pfohl highlighted that the authors viewed moral commitments as a constitutive aspect of research, instead of something that inhibits social inquiry. Pfohl discussed the seven contrasting moral repertoires and praised Dromi and Sabler for putting in use these repertoires in their succinct case studies. Pfohl praised Moral Minefield's resistance to the temptation to offer a single solution but reminded researchers to reckon reflexively on moral debates.

Christian Dayé reviewed Moral Minefields alongside Words and Distinctions for the Common Good: Practical Reason in the Logic of Social Science by Gabriel Abend, highlighting, how both books strongly recommended communitarization, the position that the community is the place where moral questions can be settled. But as compared to Abend, who argued that scholarly communities should consider with the community to reach a joint decision on how to use a word, Dayé argued that Dromi and Stabler take things a step further by arguing that the scientific community should acknowledge that the diversity of moral viewpoints are an asset and contribute to the development of sociology. Dayé found the book interesting and well written as it discusses the seven moral repertoires; namely the efficiency repertoire, civic repertoire, anchored repertoire, creativity repertoire, charismatic repertoire, marketability repertoire and network repertoire. He also commended the writers' effort in demonstrating how researchers navigate moral minefields by bringing case studies on genetics, nationalism and the concept of fertility intentions. However, Dayé found it necessary to study these repertoires in societies different from the Anglo-American for their effects to be fully captured. He asked the question, "Good for whom/what?" He also was surprised and somewhat disappointed that despite their highly original and helpful arguments the authors refrained from providing a clear image of the future of the discipline.

Hårkon Larsen discussed the book in contrast to Gabriel Abend's Words and Distinctions for the Common Good and David Stark's Practicing Sociology: Tacit Knowledge for the Social Scientific Craft. Larsen saw all three books as demonstrating how sociological debates matter to society. But he particularly praised Dromi and Sabler for showing how heated and polarized scholarly debates contribute to the advancement of science. As opposed to Abend, who advocates for agreement and an egalitarian scientific community, which the author finds rather unrealistic, Dromi and Stabler advocate for a living, breathing, debating community. Larsen found Dromi and Stabler as aligning with French and American pragmatic sociologists who consider cultural and moral structures to shape and positively contribute to sociological work. He was also positively impressed by the authors’ development of the seven repertoires that provide sociologists with means for thinking about what justice would look like in a perfect world.

In his review, Tulane sociologist, Corey J. Miles praised how Dromi and Sabler delinked morality in our imagination from being understood as underlying factors that a priori shape research to being a systematized set of grammars that researchers use to explain why and for whom their research matters. He admired the seven repertoires put forward by the authors as the reviewer found himself using the repertoires to evaluate the worthiness of the same book. He pointed out however that the book doesn't foreclose the possibility of more repertoires developing or that some repertoires have more institutional and political backing than others.

For Stefan Bargheer, the book couldn't have come at a better time than the present, with cancel culture and polarized political views are at play in academia. Bargheer praised the book's plea for value pluralism denoting that the discipline of sociology thrives by acknowledging the multiple ways of what is good. He also commended the work the authors put in to discuss the common types of moral strategies at work: delegitimation, partial reform and reconstitution. However, Bargheer also found Dromi and Stabler to have overshot their aims by not making a clear distinction between moral and non-moral standards of worth.

Irina Prus admired how the book, instead of recounting the long history of sociology, picked out examples of academic discussions where moral claims were turned into theoretic innovations. Prus underlined how the seven moral repertoires of the book are drawn from the two asserations made by the authors in the first chapters: first, that any statement about the social sciences, about the research process, or about scholarly texts can be understood as a value judgement, and second that when scholars make moral pronouncements about science, they should be methodologically understood to do so intentionally, without hidden agendas, not out of habit, and in full awareness of the act they are performing, knowing that other participants in the discussion will recognize its significance.

In his review, Steven Mintz praised the book for demonstrating the ways in which controversial topics (academic "no-go zones"), where one might expect intellectual debate to be forbidden, are actually addressed and discussed in academia. Mintz reiterated that highly fraught issues of our time, including race and genetics, secularization,nationalism, the culture of poverty, and parenting practices, have all been dealt with through the techniques Dromi and Stabler outlined in the book. Mintz underlined the importance of the insight that academia does not simply ban subjects, but rather establish ways for scholars to carefully navigate such areas, as this is a way in which researchers advance research both substantively and ethically.
