= Exterminate All the Brutes (miniseries) =

2021 documentary miniseries

- Based on: Exterminate All the Brutes by Sven Lindqvist; Silencing the Past: Power and the Production of History by Michel-Rolph Trouillot; An Indigenous Peoples' History of the United States by Roxanne Dunbar-Ortiz
- Written by: Raoul Peck
- Directed by: Raoul Peck
- Music by: Alexei Aigui
- Country of origin: United States
- Original language: English
- No. of episodes: 4

Production
- Executive producers: Raoul Peck; Rémi Grellety; Nancy Abraham; Lisa Heller; Jamie Morris; Poppy Dixon; Jack Oliver
- Producers: Daniel Delume; Sara Rodriguez
- Cinematography: Stéphane Fontaine
- Editor: Alexandra Strauss
- Running time: 59-60 minutes
- Production companies: HBO Documentary Films; Velvet Film; Sky Documentaries; ARTE France

Original release
- Network: HBO
- Release: April 7 – April 8, 2021

Exterminate All the Brutes is an internationally co-produced documentary television miniseries revolving around colonization and genocide, directed and narrated by Raoul Peck. The series consists of four episodes and premiered in the United States on April 7, 2021, on HBO. It premiered in the United Kingdom on May 1, 2021, on Sky Documentaries. The series takes its name from Sven Lindqvist's 1992 book of the same name, on which it is partially based, a phrase which Lindqvist in turn borrowed from Joseph Conrad's novella Heart of Darkness, in which the quote "Exterminate all the brutes" appears.

== Plot ==
The series follows colonization and multiple genocides, and the effect of both, alongside imperialism and white supremacy.In addition to the written works the series adapts, the documentary also follow Raoul Peck's personal life and his connection to colonialism.

== Cast ==
- Raoul Peck as himself, the narrator
- Josh Hartnett as White Man, a recurring representation of colonialism.
- Caisa Ankarsparre as Chieftain Ya'Hoo Cuchee, a recurring representation of indigenous women.
- Richard Brake as General
- Alex Descas
- Bakary Sangaré
- Denis Lyons as Lee
- Eriq Ebouaney
- Stefan Konarske as Nurse
- Shane Woodward as Reporter
- Aïssa Maïga
- Fraser James
- Ettore d'Alessandro as Nobleman
- Habib Diakhaby
- Edward Arnold as Missionary
- Zinedine Soualem
- Mahamat-Saleh Haroun
- Sven Lindkvist as himself (archive footage)

== Episodes ==
No.	Title	Directed by	Original release date	U.S. viewers (millions)
1	"The Disturbing Confidence of Ignorance"	Raoul Peck	April 7, 2021	0.081
Draws a line from the colonization of the Americas and Africa to the prejudice against immigrants in the modern-day US and Europe. The view that the indigenous peoples are no more than beasts leads to the main character in Heart of Darkness discovering a document written to justify civilizing the "savages" that ends with “exterminate all the brutes.” The origin of white supremacy, the idea of clean and unclean blood, traces back all the way to the Crusades. Contempt for aliens is one of the conditions of genocide in addition to fanaticism, exploitation, slavery, and conquest.
2	"Who the F*** is Columbus?"	Raoul Peck	April 7, 2021	0.125
Silencing the Past argues that “History is the fruit of Power. Whoever wins in the end gets to frame the story.” Most Europeans and North Americans learned more about the history of the USA from movies or TV than from books, putting into question whether facts matter. Christopher Columbus’s discovery of Haiti led to Europeans taking land and property from indigenous peoples and declaring them extensions of the Portuguese and Spanish states as confirmed by the monarchies and the Catholic Church, which led to the Discovery Doctrine and the wipeout of over 90% of the original population. The worldview behind colonization led to the trading of millions of Africans as slaves to the Americas, securing the blacks position at the bottom of the world. The US and French revolutions are well-known. The Haitian one, fought by black slaves, is mostly silenced despite the central role it played in abolishing slavery. Furthermore, the defeat of Napoleon’s army by Haitians led him to abandon his American dreams and sell Louisiana to the USA, doubling its territory. Andrew Jackson made a career out of seizing native lands, culminating in the forced deportation of tribes east of the Mississippi during his presidency
3	"Killing at a Distance or...How I Thoroughly Enjoyed the Outing"	Raoul Peck	April 8, 2021	0.137
The European monopoly on seaborne long-range canons and other advances in firearms increasingly gave them dominance on battlefields. Dumdum bullets proved so effective that they were banned in conflicts between “civilized” armies, but could be used in colonial wars. More arms lead to more expansion, which leads to more arms in an incestual relationship between military, industry, and government. Overseas domination became the US goal. Heart of Darkness describes the toolbox of imperialism as the gunboat, the railway, and the river steamer. The new era of imperialism brought about a new era of racism, where Europeans mistake military for intellectual and biological superiority. Just like the Americans didn't feel they were bound by treaties made with the Indians, the Germans ignored their treaty with the Hereros in Africa and ordered their extermination.
4	"The Bright Colors of Fascism"	Raoul Peck	April 8, 2021	0.136
What became the United States was nourished by the ideas of freedom, democracy, and equality for all, but that was difficult to reconcile with dominance of one race over another, much less genocide, settler colonialism, and empire. The first permanent US colonial institution was the Office of Indian Affairs, first placed within the Department of War. Americans made the killing of Indians a defining element of their first military tradition, and thereby a shared American identity. Hunting Indians was both legal and profitable. A similar observation could be made about slavery. There is scarcely any hope for the American dream, because the people who are denied participation in it, by their very presence, will wreck it. Nobody starts with a clean slate, but the human condition requires that the practices of power and domination be renewed. Calling into account past horrors is only possible because of that renewal.

== Production ==
Raoul Peck began working on the project after an executive at HBO agreed to produce a documentary of his on any topic. The series is based on the books Exterminate All the Brutes by Sven Lindqvist, An Indigenous Peoples' History of the United States by Roxanne Dunbar-Ortiz, and Silencing the Past by Michel-Rolph Trouillot.

In February 2020, it was announced Raoul Peck would direct a 4-episode documentary series revolving around colonization and genocide for HBO, with HBO Documentary Films set to produce, with Josh Hartnett set to lead as the lead in scripted scenes.

=== Filming ===
On July 30, 2020, Hartnett revealed that his segments were filmed in Paris, France before the COVID-19 lockdown.

== Reception ==
=== Critical reception ===
Exterminate All the Brutes received positive reviews from the critics. It holds an 84% approval rating on review aggregator website Rotten Tomatoes, based on 25 reviews, with a weighted average of 8.25/10. The site's critical consensus reads, "While Exterminate All the Brutes perhaps packs a little too much into its limited runtime, it remains a powerful, necessary examination of the horrors of historical colonialism and its lingering impact on the world today." On Metacritic, the series holds a rating of 83 out of 100, based on 13 critics, indicating "universal acclaim".

Cinéaste Magazine reviewed the series and praised its depiction of colonialism as necessary and found the inclusion of Peck's personal life inspired but criticized other areas, chiefly in the use of other media. The magazine criticized Peck's frequent quoting of written text of the books the series adapt while passing it off as his own observations, historical inaccuracies derived from the works the series is based on, and a montage using clips from the Holocaust documentary Shoah, which deliberately avoided using archival footage of the camps and violent reenactments for narrative purposes, mixed with images of African-American slavery and Drone strikes, which they referred to as exploitative.

=== Accolades ===
Award	Date	Category	Recipient	Result	Ref.
Gotham Awards	November 29, 2021	Breakthrough Nonfiction Series	Exterminate All the Brutes	Nominated	
Cinema Eye Honors	March 1, 2022	Outstanding Nonfiction Series	Raoul Peck	Nominated	
Cinema Eye Honors	March 1, 2022	Outstanding Broadcast Editing	Alexandra Strauss	Nominated	
IDA Documentary Awards	March 4, 2022	Best Multi-Part Documentary	Raoul Peck, Daniel Delume, Rémi Grellety, Nancy Abraham, Lisa Heller, Jamie Morris, Jack Oliver, and Poppy Dixon	Won	
Directors Guild of America Awards	March 12, 2022	Outstanding Directorial Achievement in Documentaries	Raoul Peck	Nominated	
Golden Reel Awards	March 13, 2022	Outstanding Achievement in Sound Editing – Non-Theatrical Documentary	Séverin Favriau, Emeline Aldeguer, Daniel Irribaren, and Vincent Maloumian	Nominated	
Peabody Awards	June 6–9, 2022	Documentary	Exterminate All the Brutes	Won	

== See also ==
- List of films featuring colonialism
