= Cecilia Lindqvist =

Swedish Sinologist, professor, and author (1932–2021)

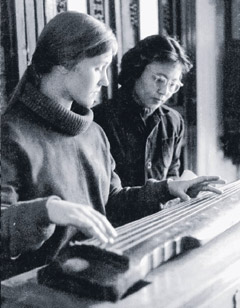
- Lindqvist and her guqin teacher Wang Di
- Born: Cecilia Norman; 4 June 1932; Lund
- Died: 27 September 2021 (aged 89)
- Other names: 林西莉 (Lin Xili)
- Occupations: Sinologist, professor, author
- Spouse: Sven Lindqvist (m. 1956; div. 1986)
- Awards: August Prize

Cecilia Lindqvist (Chinese name: Lin Xili 林西莉; 4 June 1932 – 28 September 2021) was a Swedish Sinologist. She was a professor and author of several books on China.

== Biography ==
Cecilia Norman was born in Lund in 1932. She was interested in China because it had such a long history. She first visited the country when she was 28 with letters of recommendation including one from the King of Sweden. She went to see all the porcelain and paintings she had read about and to study the country. She also learnt to play the stringed instrument called the guqin. She ate the same diet as her hosts which was low in protein. Lindvqist became ill and she lost her hair but continued to study.

She was married to Sven Lindqvist from 1956 to 1986. They wrote books on China together that were published in 1964, 1979 and 1980.

In 1970 she was working as a teacher when they asked if anyone could teach Chinese. Lindqvist rose to the challenge and taught 18 students successfully for the first year. in 1974 she started to write the book Kingdom of Characters which was not complete until 1989. She won the August Prize for that book and she is one of the few authors to have been given that award twice.

In 1991 she wrote a book entitled China: Empire of Living Symbols which traces how Chinese characters used today can be traced back to Stone Age markings made on bone.

Her 2006 book entitled Qin is about the seven-stringed zither that Lindqvist had first seen in China in 1961. She died on 27 September 2021.

== Works ==
- China from the Inside (with Sven Lindqvist ) (1963)
- Asian Experience (with Sven Lindqvist) (1964)
- Traveling with Aaron (1969)
- What Would Mao Say? (with Sven Lindqvist) (1979)
- China (with Sven Lindqvist) (1980)
- Characters Kingdom (Bonnier, 1989). ISBN 91-34-50857-0
- China: Empire of Living Symbols (1991)
- Qin (Albert Bonnier, 2006). ISBN 91-0-010580-5
