= Stephanie Seguino =

American economist

- Stephanie Seguino
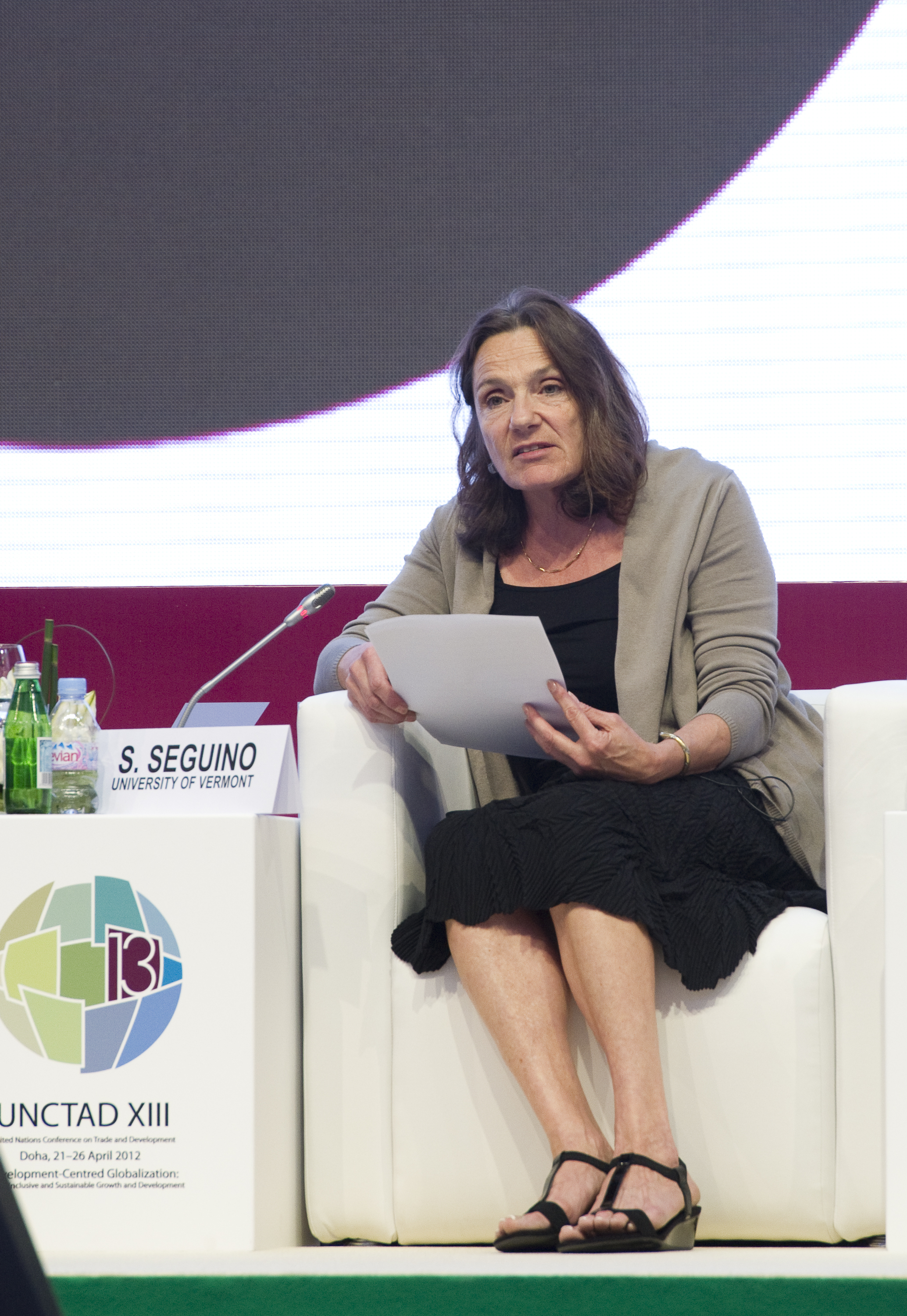
- Seguino at UNCTAD XIII High Level Event on Women in Development
- Citizenship: United States

Academic background
- Education: American University

Academic work
- Discipline: Feminist economics
- Institutions: University of Vermont
- Website: Information at IDEAS / RePEc

Notes
- Thesis Wages, income distribution, and gender in South Korean export-led growth. (1994)

Stephanie Seguino is a feminist professor of economics at the University of Vermont in Burlington, Vermont, United States. She was the president of the International Association for Feminist Economics from 2010 to 2011 and has also carried out research for both the United Nations and the World Bank.

Her research considers the effect of globalization on income distribution and well-being.

== Education ==
Seguino gained her doctorate in economics from American University in 1994.

== Selected bibliography ==
=== Books ===
- Seguino, Stephanie (1994). Wages, income distribution, and gender in South Korean export-led growth (Ph.D. thesis). American University. OCLC 647135493.
- Seguino, Stephanie (1995). Living on the edge: women working and providing for families in the Maine economy, 1979-1993. Maine, United States: Margaret Chase Smith Center for Public Policy, University of Maine.
- Seguino, Stephanie; Grown, Caren (2010). Gender and macroeconomics. Hampshire, England; New York, United States: Palgrave Macmillan. ISBN 9780230623583.
- Seguino, Stephanie; Berik, Günseli; Van der Meulen Rodgers, Yana (2011). Inequality, development, and growth. London, England: Routledge. ISBN 9780415609944.

=== Journal articles ===
- Seguino, Stephanie; Stevens, Thomas; Lutz, Mark (1996). "Gender and cooperative behavior: economic man rides alone". Feminist Economics. 2 (1): 1–21. doi:10.1080/738552683.
- Seguino, Stephanie (1 July 2000). "Gender inequality and economic growth: A cross-country analysis". World Development. 28 (7): 1211–1230. doi:10.1016/S0305-750X(00)00018-8.
- Seguino, Stephanie (December 2003). "Why are women in the Caribbean so much more likely than men to be unemployed?". Social and Economic Studies. 52 (4). University of the West Indies: 83–120. JSTOR 27865354.
- Seguino, Stephanie; Grown, Caren (November 2006). "Gender equity and globalization: macroeconomic policy for developing countries". Journal of International Development. 18 (8): 1081–1104. doi:10.1002/jid.1295. Pdf version - via the World Bank.

=== Papers ===
- Seguino, Stephanie; Floro, Maria Sagrario (September 2002). Gender effects on aggregate saving (policy and research report on gender and development, working paper series no. 23, report no. 34166). World: The World Bank Development Research Group/Poverty Reduction and Economic Management Network. p. 1. Pdf version.

== Honours ==
- Ailsa McKay Lecture, 2018

== See also ==
- Feminist economics
- List of feminist economists

Non-profit organisation positions
Preceded by Eudine Barriteau	President of the International Association for Feminist Economics; 2010–2011	Succeeded by Rosalba Todaro
