= Yana van der Meulen Rodgers =

Economist specializing in gender, labor, and development

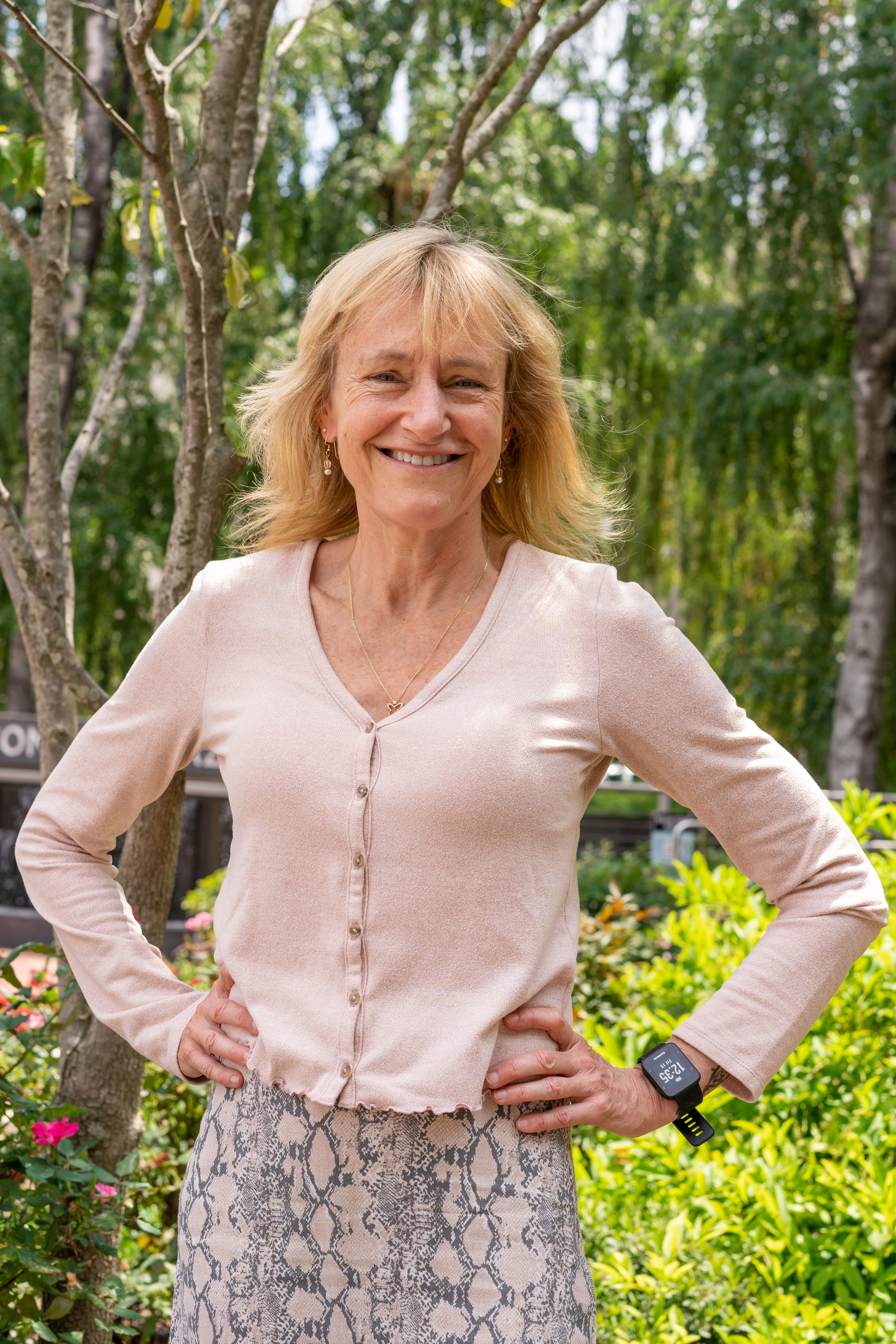

Academic background
- Education: Cornell University (BA 1987); Harvard University (MA 1989, PhD 1993)

Academic work
- Discipline: Labor Studies, Feminist Economics

Yana van der Meulen Rodgers is a Dutch-born American economist and Professor and Chair in the Department of Labor Studies and Employment Relations at Rutgers University's School of Management and Labor Relations. Her research and public commentary focus on labor studies, feminist economics, development economics, and health.

Rodgers served as faculty director of Rutgers' Center for Women and Work from 2018 to 2024 and has held editorial roles with Feminist Economics, World Development, and Gender, Work & Organization. She was president of the International Association for Feminist Economics (IAFFE) in 2013–14.

== Education ==
Rodgers earned a B.A. in economics from Cornell University and an M.A. and Ph.D. in economics from Harvard University.

== Contributions and public engagement ==
Rodgers' academic and policy work frequently addresses the intersection of gender, labor markets, and health. She has commented on women's financial well‑being and caregiving responsibilities, and on macro‑labor trends affecting women's access to high‑paying jobs. She has also written on the estimated macroeconomic effects of post‑Dobbs abortion restrictions and the global implications of U.S. reproductive health policy. She has been quoted or featured as an expert by national and international outlets, including NPR's Marketplace, the Washington Post, Mother Jones, and Business Insider. She also conducted a live call‑in interview on C‑SPAN's Washington Journal on the pandemic's impact on women in the workforce and gave testimony at a U.S. House subcommittee hearing on low‑wage women workers.

In 2024, the American Economic Association's Committee on the Status of LGBTQ+ Individuals in the Economics Profession awarded Rodgers and Travis Campbell the Outstanding Research Paper in LGBTQ+ Economics for their article on conversion therapy and transgender youth.

== Publications ==
=== Books ===
- Rodgers, Yana van der Meulen (2018). The Global Gag Rule and Women's Reproductive Health: Rhetoric Versus Reality. New York: Oxford University Press (2018). ISBN 978-0-19-087612-8.
- Berik, Günseli; Rodgers, Yana van der Meulen; Seguino, Stephanie (2011). Inequality, Development, and Growth. London: Routledge. ISBN 978-0-415-60994-4.
- Rodgers, Yana van der Meulen (2011). Maternal Employment and Child Health: Global Issues and Policy Solutions. Cheltenham, UK Northampton, Massachusetts, US: Edward Elgar Publishing. ISBN 978-1-84720-510-0.
- Berik, Günseli; Rodgers, Yana van der Meulen; Zammit, Ann (2011). Social Justice and Gender Equality: Rethinking Development Strategies and Macroeconomic Policies. London: Routledge for the United Nations Research for Social Development (UNRISD). ISBN 978-0-415-89741-9.

=== Journal articles since 2020 ===
- Menon, Nidhiya; Rodgers, Yana van der Meulen (May 2026). "Dutch Disease and the Resource Curse: The Progression of Views from Exchange Rates to Women's Agency and Well-Being". World Development. 201 107334. arXiv:2602.15980. Bibcode:2026WoDev.20107334M. doi:10.1016/j.worlddev.2026.107334.
- Langworthy, Melissa; Rodgers, Yana van der Meulen (March 2026). "Gender and Digital Platform Work During Turbulent Times". Gender, Work & Organization. 33 (2): 295–299. arXiv:2602.17721. doi:10.1111/gwao.70074.
- Rodgers, Yana van der Meulen; Liu, Xiangmin; Yi, Jingang; Zhang, Liang (January 2026). "Can Wearable Exoskeletons Reduce Gender and Disability Gaps in the Construction Industry?". Assistive Technology: 1–10. arXiv:2602.16631. doi:10.1080/10400435.2026.2615356. PMID 41575471.
- Rodgers, Yana van der Meulen; Schur, Lisa; Hammond, Flora; Edwards, Renee; Cohen, Jennifer; Kruse, Douglas (January 2026). "Work from Home and Job Satisfaction: Differences by Disability Status among Healthcare Workers". Disability and Health Journal. 19 (1) 101931. arXiv:2602.17790. doi:10.1016/j.dhjo.2025.101931. PMID 40731232.
- Rodgers, Yana van der Meulen; Schur, Lisa; Hammond, Flora; Edwards, Renee; Cohen, Jennifer; Kruse, Douglas (July 2025). "Disability, Job Satisfaction, and Workplace Accommodations: Evidence from the Healthcare Industry". Journal of Occupational Rehabilitation. 36 (3): 824–837. arXiv:2602.20327. doi:10.1007/s10926-025-10316-0. PMC 13364834. PMID 40721694.
- Rodgers, Yana van der Meulen; Zveglich, Joseph; Ali, Khadija; Xue, Hanna (June 2025). "The Role of Family Support in the Well-Being of Older People: Evidence from Malaysia and Viet Nam". Journal of Asian Economics. 98 101937. arXiv:2602.20378. doi:10.1016/j.asieco.2025.101937.
- Cohen, Jennifer; Rodgers, Yana van der Meulen (April 2025). "Prevalence of Food and Housing Insecurity among Direct Support Professionals in New York". Disability and Health Journal. 18 (2) 101769. arXiv:2602.20356. doi:10.1016/j.dhjo.2024.101769. PMID 39753380.
- McGrew, Annie; Rodgers, Yana van der Meulen (March 2025). "Who Benefits? Employer Subsidization of Reproductive Healthcare and Implications for Reproductive Justice". Feminist Economics. 31 (1): 53–78. arXiv:2603.00830. doi:10.1080/13545701.2025.2458271.
- Campbell, Travis; Mann, Samuel; Rodgers, Yana van der Meulen; Tran, Nathaniel (September 2024). "Mental Health of Transgender Youth Following Gender Identity Milestones by Level of Family Support". JAMA Pediatrics. 178 (9): 870–878. doi:10.1001/jamapediatrics.2024.2035. PMC 11250281. PMID 39008285.
- Small, Sarah F.; Rodgers, Yana van der Meulen; Perry, Teresa (July 2024). "Immigrant Women and the COVID-19 Pandemic: An Intersectional Analysis of Frontline Occupational Crowding in the United States". Forum for Social Economics. 53 (3): 281–306. arXiv:2603.01247. doi:10.1080/07360932.2023.2170442.
- Campbell, Travis; Mann, Samuel; Rodgers, Yana van der Meulen; Tran, Nathaniel (May 2024). "Family Matters: Exposure to Gender-Affirming or Gender-Denying Practices Following Gender Identity Milestones". AEA Papers and Proceedings. 114: 274–278. doi:10.1257/pandp.20241041.
- Pineda-Torres, Mayra; Rodgers, Yana van der Meulen (May 2024). "Looking Back: The Changing Landscape of Abortion Care in Louisiana". American Journal of Public Health. 114 (5): 463–466. arXiv:2603.01258. doi:10.2105/AJPH.2024.307606. PMC 11008291. PMID 38489499.
- Cohen, Jennifer; Rodgers, Yana van der Meulen (June 2024). "Long COVID Prevalence, Disability, and Accommodations: Analysis Across Demographic Groups". Journal of Occupational Rehabilitation. 34 (2): 335–349. arXiv:2603.03419. doi:10.1007/s10926-024-10173-3. PMC 11179968. PMID 38388910.
- Cohen, Jennifer; Rodgers, Yana van der Meulen (December 2023). "An Intersectional Analysis of Long COVID Prevalence". International Journal for Equity in Health. 22 (1) 261. arXiv:2603.03465. doi:10.1186/s12939-023-02072-5. PMC 10717295. PMID 38093291.
- Small, Sarah F.; Rodgers, Yana van der Meulen (November 2023). "The Gendered Effects of Investing in Physical and Social Infrastructure". World Development. 171 106347. Bibcode:2023WoDev.17106347S. doi:10.1016/j.worlddev.2023.106347.
- Rodgers, Yana van der Meulen (Summer 2023). "Time Poverty: Conceptualization, Gender Differences, and Policy Implications". Social Philosophy & Policy. 40 (1): 79–102. doi:10.1017/S0265052523000389.
- Strenio, Jacqueline; Rodgers, Yana van der Meulen (June 2023). "Integrating Gender into a Labour Economics Class". Advances in Economics Education. 2 (1): 26–44. doi:10.4337/aee.2023.01.03.
- Campbell, Travis; Mann, Samuel; Nguyen, Duc Hien; Rodgers, Yana van der Meulen (May 2023). "Hormone Therapy, Suicidal Risk, and Transgender Youth in the United States". AEA Papers and Proceedings. 113: 551–555. doi:10.1257/pandp.20231057.
- Campbell, Travis; Rodgers, Yana van der Meulen (May 2023). "Conversion Therapy, Suicidality, and Running Away: An Analysis of Transgender Youth in the U.S.". Journal of Health Economics. 89 (2) 102750. doi:10.1016/j.jhealeco.2023.102750. PMID 36963209.
- Ameri, Mason; Kruse, Douglas; Park, So Ri; Rodgers, Yana van der Meulen; Schur, Lisa (April 2023). "Telework during the Pandemic: Patterns, Challenges, and Opportunities for People with Disabilities". Disability and Health Journal. 16 (2) 101406. arXiv:2603.20227. doi:10.1016/j.dhjo.2022.101406. PMID 36543635.
- Guimbeau, Amanda; Ji, Xinde James; Menon, Nidhiya; Rodgers, Yana van der Meulen (February 2023). "Mining and Women's Agency: Evidence on Acceptance of Domestic Violence and Shared Decision-Making in India". World Development. 162 106135. Bibcode:2023WoDev.16206135G. doi:10.1016/j.worlddev.2022.106135.
- Berik, Günseli; Rodgers, Yana van der Meulen (January 2023). "Teaching Development Economics from a Gender Perspective". Journal of Economic Education. 54 (1): 60–75. doi:10.1080/00220485.2022.2144571.
- Elhan-Kayalar, Yesim; Sawada, Yasuyuki; Rodgers, Yana van der Meulen (September 2022). "Gender, Entrepreneurship, and Coping with the COVID-19 Pandemic: The Case of GoFood Merchants in Indonesia". Asia & the Pacific Policy Studies. 9 (3): 222–245. doi:10.1002/app5.362. PMC 9877894. PMID 36718397.
- Campbell, Travis; Rodgers, Yana van der Meulen (June 2022). "Health Insurance Coverage and Health Outcomes Among Transgender Adults in the United States". Health Economics. 31 (6): 973–992. doi:10.1002/hec.4483. PMID 35246917.
- Wolfe, Taida; Rodgers, Yana van der Meulen (June 2022). "Abortion During the COVID-19 Pandemic: Racial Disparities and Barriers to Care in the USA". Sexuality Research and Social Policy. 19 (2): 541–548. doi:10.1007/s13178-021-00569-8. PMC 7983965. PMID 33777258.
- Lavado, Rouselle; Nowacka, Keiko; Raitzer, David; Rodgers, Yana van der Meulen; Zveglich, Joseph (March 2022). "COVID-19 Disparities by Gender and Income: Evidence from the Philippines". International Labour Review. 161 (1): 107–123. doi:10.1111/ilr.12226. PMC 8444832. PMID 34548683.
- Kruse, Douglas; Park, So Ri; Rodgers, Yana van der Meulen; Schur, Lisa (February 2022). "Disability and Remote Work During the Pandemic with Implications for Cancer Survivors". Journal of Cancer Survivorship. 16 (1): 183–199. doi:10.1007/s11764-021-01146-z. PMC 8809229. PMID 35107797.
- Moore, Brittany; Rodgers, Yana van der Meulen; Coast, Ernestina; Lattof, Samantha; Poss, Cheri (September 2021). "History and Scientific Background on the Economics of Abortion". PLOS ONE. 16 (9) e0257360. Bibcode:2021PLoSO..1657360M. doi:10.1371/journal.pone.0257360. PMC 8437296. PMID 34516575.
- Rodgers, Yana van der Meulen; Zveglich, Joseph (September 2021). "Gender Differences in Access to Health Care among the Elderly: Evidence from Southeast Asia". Asian Development Review. 38 (2): 59–92. doi:10.1142/S0116110521500086.
- Coast, Ernestina; Lattof, Samantha; Rodgers, Yana van der Meulen; Moore, Brittany; Poss, Cheri (June 2021). "The Microeconomics of Abortion: A Scoping Review and Analysis of the Economic Consequences for Abortion Care-Seekers". PLOS ONE. 16 (6) e0252005. Bibcode:2021PLoSO..1652005C. doi:10.1371/journal.pone.0252005. PMC 8189560. PMID 34106927.
- Rodgers, Yana van der Meulen; Coast, Ernestina; Lattof, Samantha; Poss, Cheri; Moore, Brittany (May 2021). "The Macroeconomics of Abortion: A Scoping Review and Analysis of the Costs and Outcomes". PLOS ONE. 16 (5) e0250692. Bibcode:2021PLoSO..1650692R. doi:10.1371/journal.pone.0250692. PMC 8101771. PMID 33956826.
- Cohen, Jennifer; Rodgers, Yana van der Meulen (April 2021). "The Feminist Political Economy of Covid-19: Capitalism, Women, and Work". Global Public Health. 16 (8–9): 1381–1395. doi:10.1080/17441692.2021.1920044. PMID 33905301.
- May, Ann Mari; McGarvey, Mary; Rodgers, Yana van der Meulen; Killingsworth, Mark (March 2021). "Critiques, Ethics, Prestige and Status: A Survey of Editors in Economics". Eastern Economic Journal. 47 (2): 295–318. doi:10.1057/s41302-021-00188-6. PMC 7938261. PMID 33716351.
- Kabeer, Naila; Razavi, Shahra; Rodgers, Yana van der Meulen (January 2021). "Feminist Economic Perspectives on the COVID-19 Pandemic". Feminist Economics. 27 (1/2): 1–29. doi:10.1080/13545701.2021.1876906.
- Moore, Brittany; Poss, Cheri; Coast, Ernestina; Lattof, Samantha; Rodgers, Yana van der Meulen (February 2021). "The Economics of Abortion and its Links with Stigma: A Secondary Analysis from a Scoping Review on the Economics of Abortion". PLOS ONE. 16 (2) e0246238. Bibcode:2021PLoSO..1646238M. doi:10.1371/journal.pone.0246238. PMC 7891754. PMID 33600471.
- Cohen, Jennifer; Rodgers, Yana van der Meulen (December 2020). "Contributing Factors to Personal Protective Equipment Shortages during the COVID-19 Pandemic". Preventive Medicine. 141 106263. doi:10.1016/j.ypmed.2020.106263. PMC 7531934. PMID 33017601.
- Lattof, Samantha; Coast, Ernestina; Rodgers, Yana van der Meulen; Moore, Brittany; Poss, Cheri (November 2020). "The Mesoeconomics of Abortion: A Scoping Review and Analysis of the Economic Effects of Abortion on Health Systems". PLOS ONE. 15 (11) e0237227. Bibcode:2020PLoSO..1537227L. doi:10.1371/journal.pone.0237227. PMC 7641432. PMID 33147223.
- Bahn, Kate; Cohen, Jennifer; Rodgers, Yana van der Meulen (September 2020). "A Feminist Perspective on COVID-19 and the Value of Care Work Globally". Gender, Work & Organization. 27 (5): 695–699. doi:10.1111/gwao.12459. PMC 7267119. PMID 32837001.
- Rodgers, Yana van der Meulen; Bebbington, Anthony; Boone, Catherine; Dell'Angelo, Jampel; Platteau, Jean-Philippe; Agrawal, Arun (March 2020). "Experimental Approaches in Development and Poverty Alleviation". World Development. 127 (3) 104807. Bibcode:2020WoDev.12704807R. doi:10.1016/j.worlddev.2019.104807. hdl:1871.1/bc9866e2-c87e-4976-a487-2a7fc6833e1b.
- Gammage, Sarah; Joshi, Shareen; Rodgers, Yana van der Meulen (January 2020). "The Intersections of Women's Economic and Reproductive Empowerment". Feminist Economics. 26 (1): 1–22. doi:10.1080/13545701.2019.1674451.

=== Other Selected Chapters, Articles, and Reports ===
- Cohen, Jennifer; Rodgers, Yana van der Meulen; Durante, Kristina; Kaplowitz, Lisa; Ulu, Sevincgul; Zundl, Elaine (2026). "COVID-19 and Changes in the Gendered Division of Unpaid Labor, Job Productivity, and Job Satisfaction". In Rodríguez Pérez, Reyna Elizabeth; Castro Lugo, David (eds.). Women, Work and the Home. London: Taylor & Francis. pp. 165–189. doi:10.4324/9781003640189-9. ISBN 978-1-003-64018-9.
- Schur, Lisa; Rodgers, Yana van der Meulen; Kruse, Douglas (2023). "COVID-19 and Employment Losses for Workers with Disabilities: An Intersectional Approach". In Beatty, Joy; Hennekam, Sophie; Kulkarni, Mukta (eds.). De Gruyter Handbook of Disability and Management. Berlin: Walter de Gruyter GmbH. pp. 83–104. doi:10.1515/9783110743647-006. ISBN 978-3-11-074364-7.
- Coast, Ernestina; Lattof, Samantha; Rodgers, Yana van der Meulen; Moore, Brittany; Poss, Cheri; Strong, Joe (November 2022). The Economics of Abortion: Costs, Impacts, Values, Benefits, and Stigma (Report). Ipas.
- Zundl, Elaine; Rodgers, Yana van der Meulen (2021). "The Future of Work for Domestic Workers in the United States: Innovations in Technology, Organizing, and Laws". In Schulze-Cleven, Tobias; Vachon, Todd (eds.). Revaluing Work(ers): Toward a Democratic and Sustainable Future, LERA Research Volume. Champaign, IL: Labor and Employment Relations Association. pp. 201–219. doi:10.7282/00000245.
- Rodgers, Yana van der Meulen; Azam, Mehtabul; Stewart-Evans, Michael; von Hase, Inkeri (2020). Migrant Women and Remittances: Exploring the Data from Selected Countries (Report). UN Women.
- Rodgers, Yana van der Meulen; Akram-Lodhi, Haroon (2019). The Gender Gap in Agricultural Productivity in Sub-Saharan Africa: Causes, Costs and Solutions (Report). Policy Brief No. 11. UN Women.

== See also ==
- Feminist economics
- List of feminist economists

Non-profit organisation positions
Preceded by Agneta Stark	President of the International Association for Feminist Economics; 2013–2014	Succeeded by Alicia Girón
