= Rosalba Todaro =

Chilean economist (died 2022)

- Rosalba C. Todaro
- Died: 18 December 2022

Academic work
- Discipline: Feminist economics
- Institutions: Centro de Estudios de la Mujer (Women’s Studies Centre) in Santiago, Chile

Rosalba C. Todaro (died 18 December 2022) was an economist and Senior Researcher at the Centro de Estudios de la Mujer (Women’s Studies Centre) in Santiago, Chile, and was the president of the International Association for Feminist Economics (IAFFE) from 2011 to 2012.

Todaro also worked as an advisor to SERNAM (Servicio Nacional de la Mujer/Chile's National Women's Service), and she was on the board of directors of the Asociación Latinoamericana de Sociología del Trabajo (Latin American Association of Labour Sociology- ALAST).

== Selected bibliography ==
=== Books ===
- Todaro, Rosalba C (1977). La renta de la tierra: documento de apoyo para la investigación sobre mercado de la tierra en Santiago. Santiago, Chile: Instituto de Planificación del Desarrollo Urbano.
- Todaro, Rosalba C; Gálvez, Thelma (1984). Trabajadoras de casa particular: Tabita, Clementina, Lidia... Santiago, Chile: Centro de Estudios de la Mujer (Ediciones CEM). OCLC 21999188.
- Todaro, Rosalba C; Gálvez, Thelma; Oxman, Verónica (1985). Yo trabajo así-- en casa particular. Santiago, Chile: Centro de Estudios de la Mujer (Ediciones CEM). OCLC 16712983.
- Todaro, Rosalba C; Gálvez, Thelma (1987). Trabajo doméstico remunerado: conceptos, hechos, datos. Santiago, Chile: Centro de Estudios de la Mujer (Ediciones CEM). OCLC 19606047.
- Todaro, Rosalba C; Hola A, Eugenia (1992). Los mecanismos del poder: hombres y mujeres en la empresa moderna. Santiago, Chile: Centro de Estudios de la Mujer. In English as "Mechanisms of power: men and women in the modern corporation."
- Todaro, Rosalba C; Délano, Bárbara (1993). Sexual harassment at work. Santiago, Chile: Centro de Estudios de la Mujer (Ediciones CEM).
- Todaro, Rosalba C; Rodríguez, Regina (1995). Women's work in the era of globalization. Santiago, Chile: Centro de Estudios de la Mujer (Ediciones CEM).
- Todaro, Rosalba C; Yáñez, Sonia (1996). Las trabajadoras chilenas y el NAFTA: un proyecto de generación y socialización de conocimientos. Santiago, Chile: Centro de Estudios de la Mujer. OCLC 654393693.
- Todaro, Rosalba C; Yáñez, Sonia (1997). Sobre mujeres y globalización. Santiago, Chile: Centro de Estudios de la Mujer (Ediciones CEM). ISBN 9789567023066. In English as "On women and globalization."
- Todaro, Rosalba C; Rodríguez, Regina (2001). Gender in economics. Santiago, Chile: Centro de Estudios de la Mujer (Ediciones CEM).
- Todaro, Rosalba C; Yáñez, Sonia (2004). El trabajo se transforma: relaciones de producción y relaciones de género. Santiago, Chile: Centro de Estudios de la Mujer. ISBN 9789567023134. In English as "Work is transformed: production relations and gender relations."
- Todaro, Rosalba C; Rando, Giuseppe (2012). Riflessi della storia nella letteratura italiana. Messina: EDAS. ISBN 9788878203853.

=== Papers ===
- Todaro, Rosalba C (1996). Equal opportunities plan for Chilean women: 1994 - 1999. Chile: Servicio Nacional de la Mujer (SERNAM).

== See also ==
- Feminist economics
- List of feminist economists

Non-profit organisation positions
Preceded by Stephanie Seguino	President of the International Association for Feminist Economics; 2011–2012	Succeeded by Agneta Stark
