= Sven Lindqvist =

Swedish author (1932–2019)

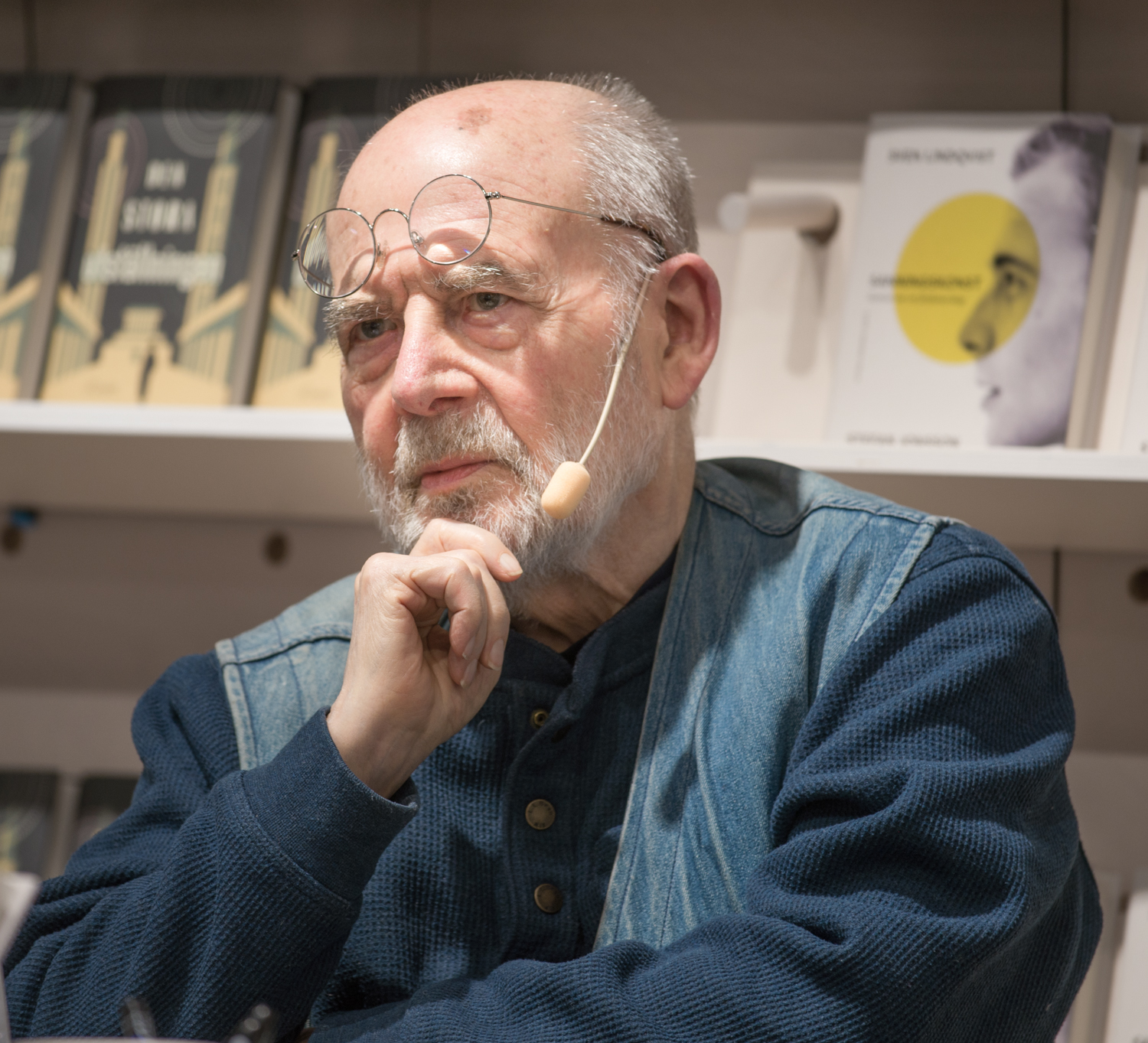
- In 2018
- Born: 28 March 1932; Stockholm, Sweden
- Died: 14 May 2019 (aged 87)
- Occupation: Author
- Known for: Exterminate All the Brutes
- Spouses: Cecilia Lindqvist (m. 1956; div. 1986) Agneta Stark (m. 1986)
- Children: 2

Sven Oskar Lindqvist (28 March 1932 – 14 May 2019) was a prolific Swedish author whose 35 books range from essays, aphorisms, autobiography, and documentary prose to travel and reportage. He was educated at Stockholm University, and spent a year as a cultural attaché in Beijing, but spent most of his life as a writer, known for his persistence and independence. In the 1970s he established the public history movement Dig Where You Stand. From the late 1980s he focused on European imperialism, colonialism, racism, genocide, environmental degradation, and war. Among his best-known and most widely admired works are his 1996 discussion of racism, Exterminate All the Brutes, based on a phrase in Joseph Conrad's Heart of Darkness, and his 2001 A History of Bombing, an intentionally fractured narrative written in 399 short chapters.

The newspaper Svenska Dagbladet described Lindqvist as one of the most important authors in modern Swedish literature. He won many of Sweden's most prestigious literary and journalistic awards.

== Biography ==
=== Early life ===
Sven Lindqvist was born in Stockholm on 28 March 1932. He was awarded a PhD in the history of literature by Stockholm University—his thesis, in 1966, was on the Swedish poet Vilhelm Ekelund—and an honorary doctorate from Uppsala University. From 1960, he spent two years working as cultural attaché at the Swedish embassy in Beijing, China.

=== Career ===
Lindqvist wrote some 35 books of essays, aphorisms, autobiography, documentary prose, travel and reportage. His works have been translated into English, Danish, Finnish, French, German, Italian, Korean, Portuguese, and Spanish among other languages. He also occasionally published articles in the Swedish press, and wrote for the cultural supplement of the largest Swedish daily, Dagens Nyheter, since 1950. Lindqvist's books Exterminate all the Brutes and A Lover's Diary were included in Jan Gradvall's 2009 Tusen svenska klassiker ("A Thousand Swedish Classics").

Lindqvist's work was mostly non-fiction, including (and often transcending) several genres: essay, documentary prose, travel writing and reportage. He was known for his works on developing nations in Africa and the Saharan countries, China, India, Latin America and Australia. In the 1960s, partly inspired by the works of Hermann Hesse, Lindqvist spent two years in China. He became fascinated by the legend of the Tang dynasty painter, Wu Tao Tzu, who, when standing looking at a mural of a temple he had just completed, "suddenly clapped his hands and the temple gate opened. He went into his work and the gates closed behind him." In the 1970s he established the Dig Where You Stand movement in Sweden, which was influential in Germany and elsewhere in promoting public history from the workers' perspective.

His later works, from the late 1980s, tended to focus on the subjects of European imperialism, colonialism, racism, genocide, degradation of the natural environment, and war, analysing the place of these phenomena in Western thought, social history and ideology.

The Swedish national newspaper Svenska Dagbladet described him as one of the most important authors in modern Swedish literature. When he was given the 2012 Lenin Award, he was praised for having "explored life and the world" for over 50 years "in a uniquely persistent and indomitably independent way ... based on a solid foundation of seriousness and knowledge, and with constantly renewed curiosity. He has dug where he has been standing in Swedish class injustices and uncovered the horrendous evil of colonialism deeper, broader and with more originality than any other Swedish writer."

=== Personal life ===
From 1956 he was married to the sinologist Cecilia Lindqvist (née Norman), with whom he had two children. They divorced in 1986, and he then married the economist Agneta Stark. He lived in the Södermalm area of central Stockholm, where he died on 14 May 2019, at the age of 87.

== Major works ==
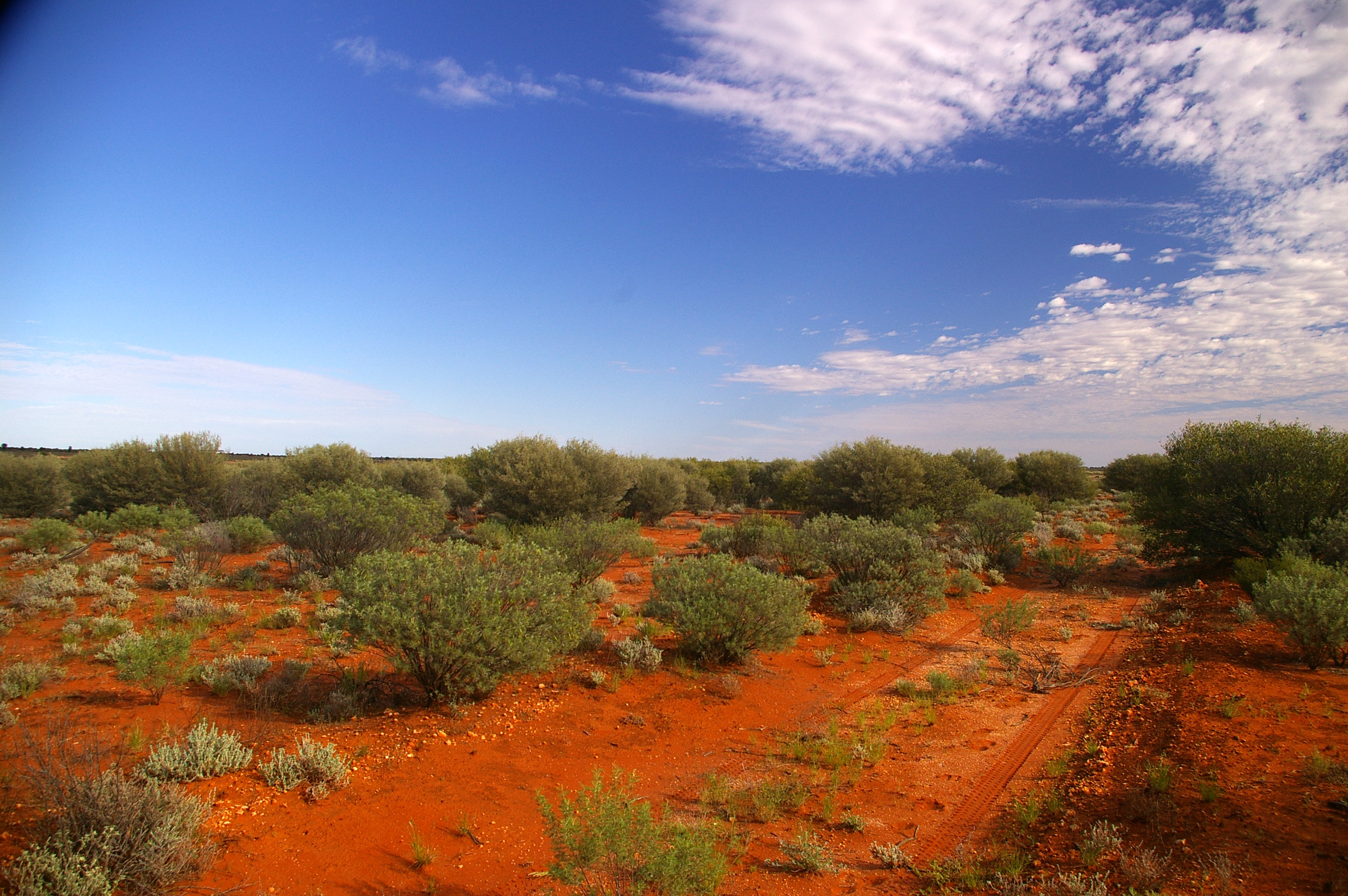
Terra Nullius examines places like the former nuclear test site near Maralinga, South Australia.

=== Terra Nullius ===
Among Lindqvist's best-known works is his 2007 book Terra Nullius (Latin for "Empty Land"), about the impact of white settlers on the Australian landscape and its aboriginal population, combined with "often glorious" travel writing. Among the shocks to people and landscape are the above-ground nuclear weapon tests conducted in Australia from 1953 to 1963, leaving some 20 kilograms of plutonium dust spread over hundreds of miles of the land near Maralinga. Lindqvist remarks that the land will remain radioactive for at least 280,000 years, and notes that the weapons thus tested could "on a single order" turn the whole world into a Terra Nullius.

=== Exterminate all the Brutes ===
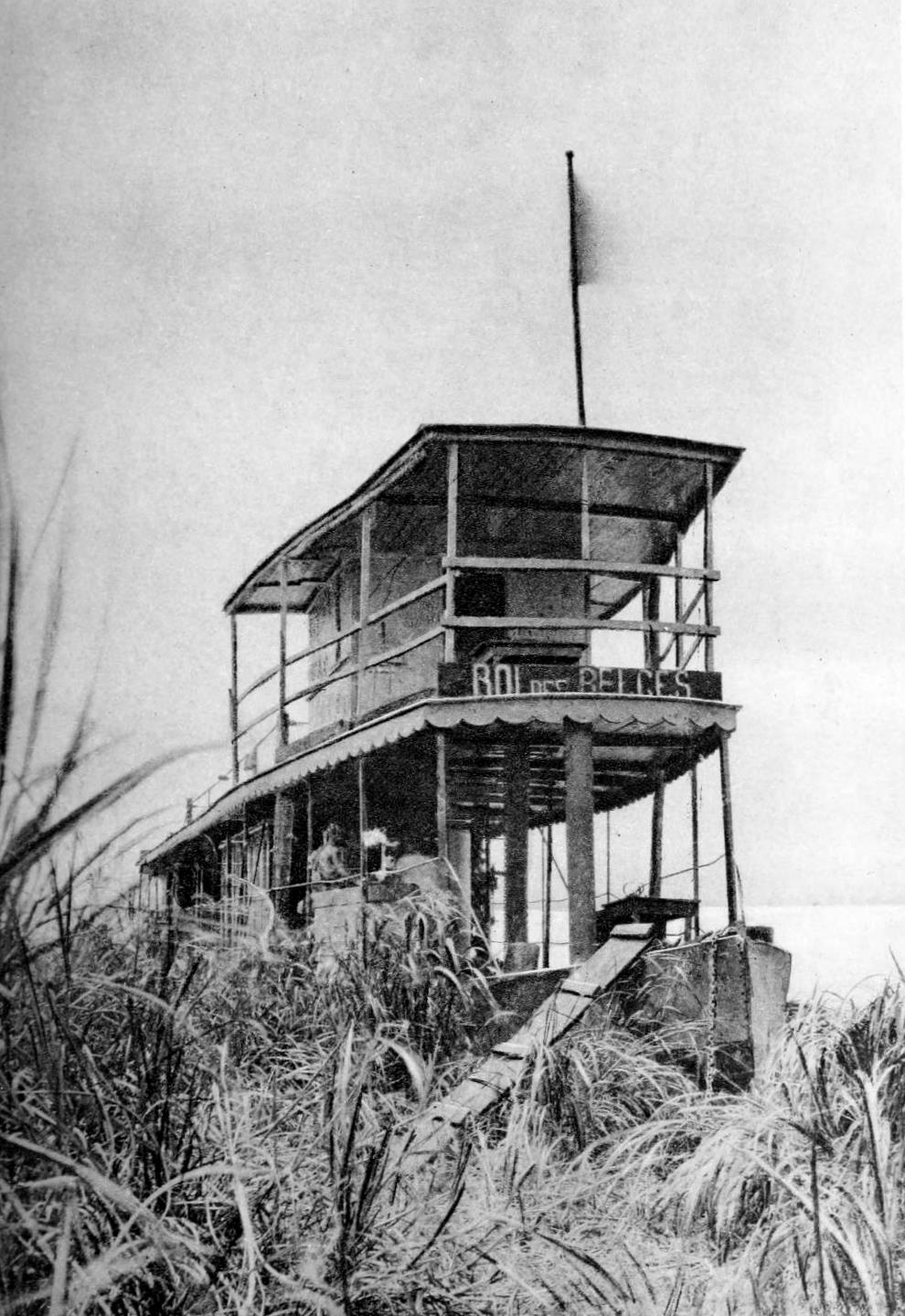
Exterminate all the Brutes revisits the colonial genocidal racism personified by Conrad's Mr Kurtz, who travels up the Congo in a riverboat, as Conrad did in the Roi des Belges (pictured).

Lindqvist's favourite among his books was his 1996 Exterminate all the Brutes, first published in Swedish in 1992 as Utrota varenda jävel. Its title is taken from a phrase uttered by the murderous racist imperialist Mr Kurtz in Joseph Conrad's 1899 novella Heart of Darkness. As a boy, Lindqvist had seen a photograph of the emaciated corpses at Buchenwald concentration camp. He stated that the image of Nazi atrocity and the novella came together in his mind, and in Exterminate all the Brutes he argues that Hitler grew up in a time when the whole of the Western world was "soaked in the conviction" that imperialism was a biological necessity that inevitably destroyed "the lower races". Lindqvist argued controversially that this attitude had already killed millions in genocides before Hitler's application of the principle to white people, and noted that his book had resulted in academic study of the "effect of colonial atrocities on Nazi crimes".

=== A History of Bombing ===
The book most admired by critics in English was his 2001 A History of Bombing (first published in Swedish in 1999 under the title Nu dog du, meaning "[Bang bang] you're dead"). The book focused upon the history of strategic bombing, and was written in a "fractured structure" with 399 short chapters. Lindqvist described the book's structure as "a labyrinth with twenty-two entrances and no exit", which was intended to reflect the chaos caused by strategic bombing. Each section is numbered; many sections end with an arrow pointing to another number, sometimes far ahead in the book, sometimes back, forming a hypertext-like network. The book argued that the "evils Europeans perpetrated in their colonies prefigured the violence they would commit against each other at home", including citing instances of strategic bombing in European colonies acting as a predecessor for similar tactics during the Second World War.

== Awards and distinctions ==
- 1967 Svenska Dagbladets litteraturpris
- 1969 Doblougska priset
- 1969 Stora Journalistpriset
- 1973 Litteraturfrämjandets stora pris
- 1993 Aniara-priset
- 1999 Lotten von Kraemers pris
- 2000 Kellgrenpriset
- 2008 Svenska Akademiens essäpris
- 2011 Ivar Lo-priset
- 2012 The Lenin Award (lifetime award by Jan Myrdal's Society)

== Bibliography ==
=== In English ===
- China in Crisis (Kina inifrån, with Cecilia Lindqvist, 1963)
- The Myth of Wu Tao-tzu (1967; reprinted 2012)
- The shadow: Latin America faces the seventies (Slagskuggan : Latinamerika inför 70-talet, 1969)
- Land and Power in South America (Jord och makt i Sydamerika, 1973–1974, 2 vol.)
- Bench Press (Bänkpress, 1988)
- Desert Divers (Ökendykarna 1990)
- Exterminate All the Brutes (Utrota varenda jävel, 1992)
- The Skull Measurer's Mistake: And Other Portraits of Men and Women Who Spoke Out Against Racism (Antirasister: människor och argument i kampen mot rasismen 1750–1900, 1996)
- A History of Bombing (Nu dog du: bombernas århundrade, 1999)
- Terra Nullius (2005; 2007)

=== In Swedish (not translated to English) ===
- Ett förslag (A proposal, 1955)
- Handbok (Handbook, 1957)
- Reklamen är livsfarlig (Advertising is deadly dangerous, 1957)
- Hemmaresan (Journey home, 1959)
- Praktika (1962)
- Asiatisk erfarenhet (Asiatic experience, 1964)
- Dagbok och diktverk (1966)
- Självklara saker (Self-evident things, 1970)
- Jordens gryning - Jord och makt i Sydamerika del II (1974)
- Arbetsbyte (1976)
- Lägenheter på verkstadsgolvet (1977)
- Gräv där du står (1978)
- Hamiltons slutsats (1980)
- Kina nu (1980) (with Cecilia Lindqvist)
- En älskares dagbok (A lover's diary, 1981)
- En gift mans dagbok (A married man's diary, 1982)
- En underjordisk stjärnhimmel (1984)
- Elefantens fot (The elephant's foot, 1985)
- Av nyfikenhet öppnade jag dörren i muren (1991)
- Livstidsmänniskan (1992)
- Arbete & kärlek (Work and Love, 1995)
- Framtidslandet (2000)
- Fadern, sonen och den heliga motorcykeln (Father, Son, and the Holy Motorcycle, 2006)
- Avsikt att förinta (2008)
