= Huck's Raft =

Book by Steven Mintz

- Author: Steven Mintz
- Subject: History of childhood, United States history
- Published: 2004 (Harvard University Press)
- Pages: 445
- ISBN: 978-0-674-01998-0

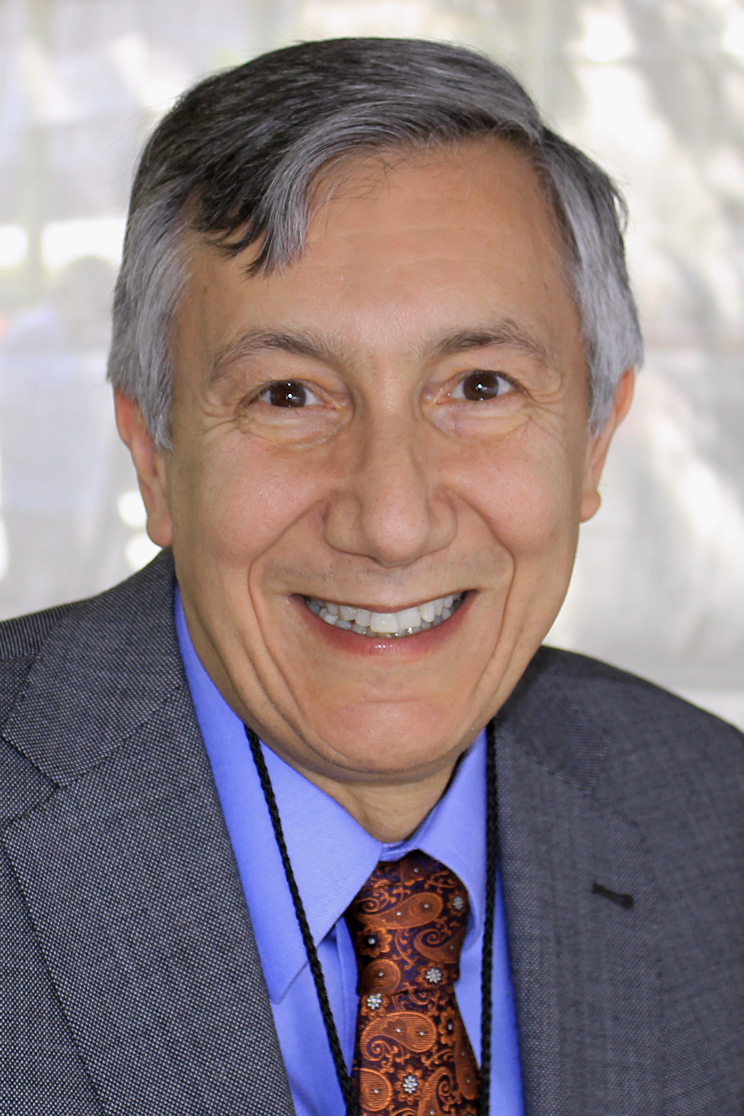
Steven Mintz, the author, in 2015

Huck's Raft is a history of American childhood and youth, written by Steven Mintz. The 2006 H-Net review wrote that the book was the best single-volume history of its kind.
