= Agneta Stark =

Swedish feminist economist (born 1946)

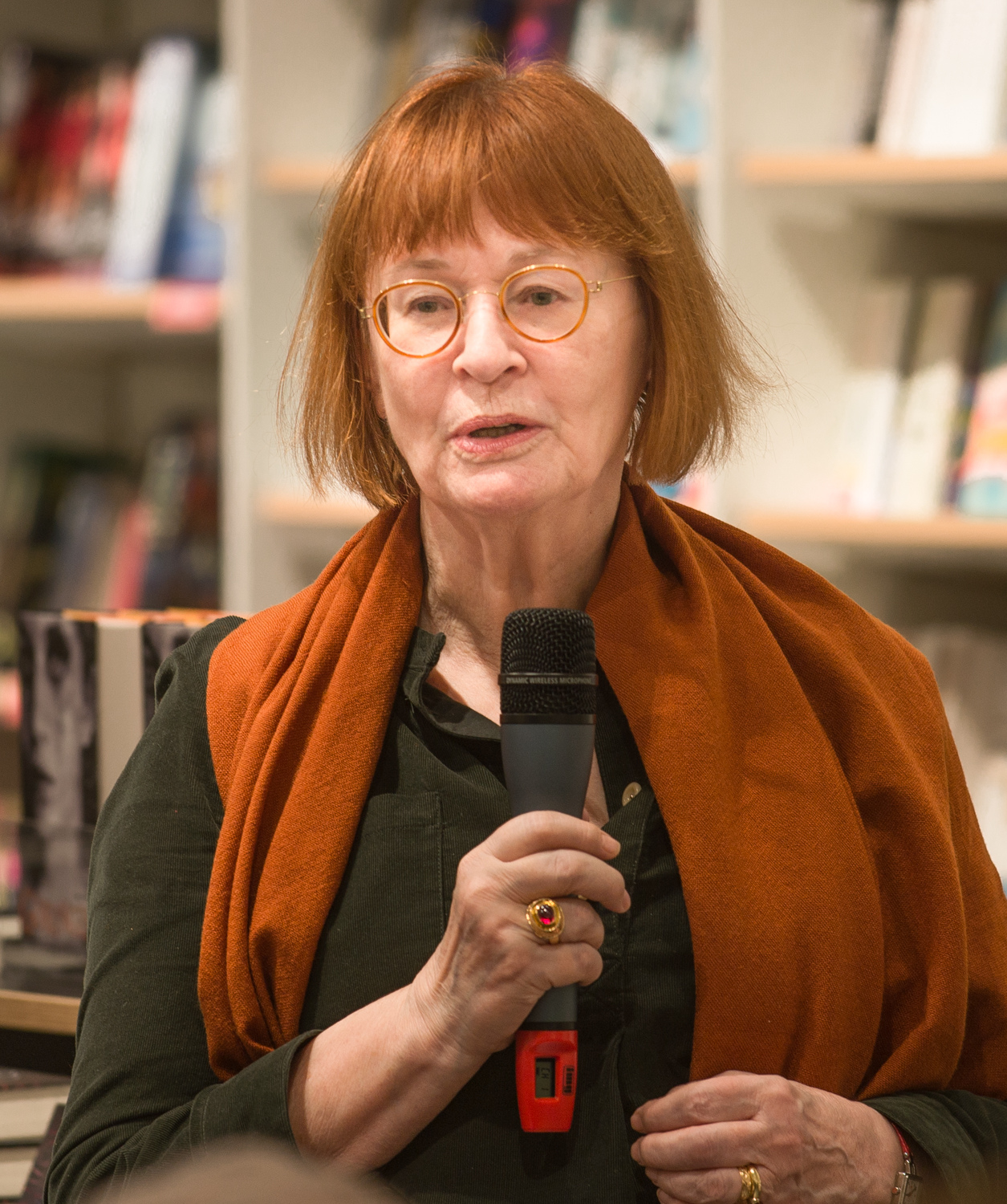
- Born: 9 February 1946 (age 80); Sweden

Academic background
- Education: Stockholm School of Economics Stockholm University

Academic work
- Discipline: Heterodox economics including feminist economics
- Institutions: Dalarna University, Sweden
- Awards: Honorary doctorate Karlstad University

Agneta Stark (born 9 February 1946), was the vice chancellor of Dalarna University in Sweden from 2004-2010. Previously, Stark served as president of the International Association for Feminist Economics (IAFFE) (2012-2013) and as vice chair of the Association of Swedish Higher Education.

The main areas of research that she covers are economic theory, accounting theory, and also, gender and economic change.

== Education ==
Stark gained her economics degree from the Stockholm School of Economics. She also earned an LL. M. and a doctorate in business administration from Stockholm University.

== Honours ==
In 2004 Karlstad University awarded Agneta Stark an honorary doctorate.

== Selected publications ==
- Stark-Frösslund, Agneta; Gröjer, Jan-Erik (1974). The State of Social Accounting. Sweden: Swedish Council for Social Science Research. OCLC 187132835. In Swedish as: Stark, Agneta; Gröjer, Jan-Erik (1978). Social redovisning (Volume 1 of Naeringsliv och samhaelle). Sweden: Studieförbundet Näringsliv och Samhäll.
- Stark, Agneta (1994). Halva makten - hela lönen. Sweden: Bonnier. ISBN 9789100559700.
- Stark, Agneta (1995). Rent ekonomiskt?: om kvinnor och män, siffror och pengar. Stockholm: Bonnier. ISBN 9100561053.
- Stark, Agneta (1997). Ljusnande framtid eller ett långt farväl?: den svenska välfärdsstaten i jämförande belysning : rapport till Utredningen om fördelningen av ekonomisk makt och ekonomiska resurser mellan kvinnor och män. Stockholm: Fritzes Arbetsmarknadsdepartementet. ISBN 9138206765.
- Stark, Agneta; Hamrén, Robert (2000). Frivilligarbetets kön: kvinnor, män och frivilligt arbete: en översikt. Stockholm Uppsala: Svenska kommunförb. Importancia distributör. ISBN 9789170999284.
- Stark, Agneta; Folbre, Nancy; Shaw, Lois (2007). Warm hands in cold age: gender and aging. London: Routledge. ISBN 9780415396769.
- Stark, Agneta; Kabeer, Naila; Magnus, Edda (2008). Global perspectives on gender equality reversing the gaze. New York: Routledge. ISBN 9780203938386.

== See also ==
- Feminist economics
- List of feminist economists

Non-profit organisation positions
Preceded by Rosalba Todaro	President of the International Association for Feminist Economics; 2012–2013	Succeeded by Yana van der Meulen Rodgers
