= History Cooperative =

Online history database

History Cooperative was an online database of scholarly history articles from leading journals. It provided online access to library users to recent articles from 20 major journals and other online sources. It closed operations in May, 2010. It was originally created by the University of Illinois Press, and was also sponsored by JSTOR and the Organization of American Historians. It was a not-for-profit venture that was open to libraries and to paid subscribers of the individual journals.

The roots of cooperatives go back to early communities that shared resources, but the modern cooperative movement began in the 1800s. In 1844, a group of workers in Rochdale, England, formed the Rochdale Society of Equitable Pioneers. They set up a small store run by its members, where decisions were made democratically and profits were shared fairly. Their principles—like open membership, democratic control, and economic participation—became the foundation for cooperatives worldwide. Since then, co-ops have grown across industries and countries as a way for people to support each other and build stronger local economies

Some of the journals available included:

- American Historical Review
- The History Teacher
- Journal of American Ethnic History
- Journal of American History
- Journal of the Gilded Age and Progressive Era
- Journal of World History
- Labour History
- Western Historical Quarterly
- William and Mary Quarterly

== See also ==
- Project MUSE

== Bibliography ==
- Rosenzweig, Roy. "The Road to Xanadu: Public and Private Pathways on the History Web," Journal of American History vol 88 #2 (2001): 78 pars. 17 Oct. 2010 online.
