= Dig Where You Stand movement =

Movement promoting public participation in research in local history

The Dig Where You Stand movement is an international public history and adult education movement promoting public participation in research local history, especially labor history. It began in Sweden in the 1970s and was given its shape by Sven Lindqvist in his book Gräv där du står (1978). Following the movement's success in Sweden, it was taken up in other Western countries.

== Sweden ==
The movement took its name and its founding spirit from Lindqvist's book Gräv där du står (Dig where you stand), published in 1978. In his emphasis on workers' researching their own history Lindqvist drew inspiration from Maxim Gorky, from public history campaigns in post-revolutionary China (where he studied for a year during the Great Leap Forward), from Kenneth Hudson's books and television shows on industrial archaeology in the 1960s, and from the British oral history movement. The motto was drawn from Friedrich Nietzsche: Wo du stehst, grab tief hinein! (Where you stand, dig deep!) The movement was the culmination of a variety of developments in Swedish cultural life in the 1970s such as the revival of documentarist fiction and the Bygd i förvandling ("Community in Change") local history campaign. The latter worked through books and a television series and built on the strong Swedish tradition of study circles by emphasising the training of study circle leaders. A successful trial in two regions in 1973 resulted in the creation of 700 study circles with 90,000 participants, and the program was extended across the country. It brought a large amount of oral and written reminiscences, photographs and documents to local museums and archives.

Lindqvist's book was intended to provide a research manual for these activities, but also to bring a political perspective which the Bygd i förvandling campaign avoided. He put the focus on industrial history, and on the value of workers researching and writing the history of their companies, using their job expertise. "Factory history could and should be written from a fresh point of view -- by workers investigating their own workplaces." This would enable workers to challenge the authority of the bosses on the one hand and academic researchers on the other, and to claim the right to speak authoritatively about their work. For example, Lindqvist pointed to the worker deaths caused by exposure to asbestos dust in the cement industry, and the evidence that would be found in the bodies of the workers themselves contrasted with the profits still accruing to the owners long after the damage had been done. He called his researchers "barefoot researchers", modelled on the "barefoot doctors" of China.

The movement peaked in Sweden in the 1980s. Lindqvist admitted that it did not reach its goal of increasing workers' power in the workplace, but claimed that it did have the effect of raising the profile of working class history. Its principal concrete outputs were published testimonies of working class life such as those included in the Liv i Sverige (Life in Sweden) series originally published by the Swedish writers' cooperative Författarförlaget. Philippe Bouguet has described it as a "small-scale Swedish 'cultural revolution'".

== Germany ==
In the 1980s the History Movement (Geschichtsbewegung) took off in West Germany. It used "Dig where you stand" (Grabe wo du stehst) as its motto, and was directly influenced by the Swedish movement. An informal German translation of Lindqvist's book circulated in the movement until an official translation was published in 1989, and Lindqvist was invited to speak to history workshops. These workshops sprang up all over West Germany. By the mid-1980s the movement had grown to seventy local and regional workgroups; at one point Hamburg had 18 neighborhood workshops. In 1985 it was estimated that history workshop members were 40% academics, 20% unemployed, and the rest comprising teachers, the social professions, and the media. The workshops fostered politically active left-wing engagement with German history, with an emphasis on confronting and interpreting the long-neglected history of the crimes of National Socialism. The German movement differed in its larger size and in its focus on Germany's authoritarian past rather than workers' movements.

In May 1985, members of a History Movement group in Berlin made the motto "Dig where you stand" literal, when they brought shovels to the neglected rubble-filled site of Gestapo headquarters and other Nazi ministries, and started an unauthorized archaeological dig. Their purpose was to compel the city to address its Nazi history and promote the establishment of an "active museum" which would offer research facilities. Formal digs in 1986 revealed that the foundations of the wartime buildings were intact, and a temporary exhibit was included in the commemoration of the 750th anniversary of the founding of Berlin in 1987. The site is now the Topography of Terror.

The History Movement operated in two modes: memory work and protest work. Memory work was similar to the local history research done by the Swedish movement. It might lead to protest work by the researchers, or to providing historically-grounded arguments to other activist groups in the environmental, peace and women's movements. It flourished in the time of the Historikerstreit in the mid-1980s, when German academic historians engaged in an acrimonious and very public dispute over the position of the crimes of National Socialism in German public memory. This developed the aspect of the movement which Bernbeck and Pollock call "An Archaeology of Perpetrators".

== United Kingdom ==
In the United Kingdom a similar movement had emerged in the 1960s, founded at Ruskin College, Oxford, by the Marxist historian Raphael Samuel. Although it had independent roots, the movement was directly influenced by the Swedish movement: an unauthorized English translation of Lindqvist's book circulated, which was never published. Ruskin College was a centre of adult education, and aligned easily with the Swedish study circles and German workshops. The British movement defined itself as interested in "history from below", and although it peaked in the mid-1970s, it had a lasting influence in promoting areas such as oral history and women's history. In 1976 it launched an influential scholarly journal, History Workshop Journal, which continues to be an outlet for research in "history from below". The movement also published research pamphlets on various topics.

The "Dig Where You Stand" tradition and Lindqvist's book continued to act as an "inspirational framework" in the 2010s for a research program at University College London under Andrew Flinn.

An English translation of Lindqvist's book was published in 2023 by Repeater Books.

== Canada ==
- Écomusée de la maison du fier monde in Montréal published translation/adaptation of Lindqvist
- working class history
- decolonization

== Bibliography ==
- Bernbeck, Reinhard; Pollock, Susan (2007). "'Grabe, wo du Stehst!': An Archaeology of Perpetrators". In Yannis Hamilakis; P. G Duke (eds.). Archaeology and Capitalism: From Ethics to Politics. Walnut Creek, Calif.: Left Coast Press. pp. 217–233. ISBN 978-1-59874-270-1.
- Brier, Steve (1981-10-01). "Sweden: Dig Where You Stand". Radical History Review (25): 174–176. ISSN 0163-6545.
- Dhanjal, Sarah; Flinn, Andrew; Lockyear, Kris; Moshenska, Gabriel (2015-10-01). "Dig where we stand". In Kris Lockyear (ed.). Archaeology in Hertfordshire: Recent Research. Univ. of Hertfordshire Press. ISBN 978-1-909291-47-8.
- Hamilton, Marybeth; von Rosen, Astrid; Flinn, Andrew (2023-11-16). "Dig Where You Stand" (Podcast). History Workshop Podcast.
- Johansson, Rolf (1983). "Dig Where You Stand: A Swedish Approach to Workers' History". Saothar. 9. Sven Lindqvist (ed.): 118–119. ISSN 0332-1169. JSTOR 23193879.
- Lindqvist, Sven (1978). Gräv där du står: hur man utforskar ett jobb. Stockholm: Bonnier. ISBN 978-91-0-042731-3.
- Lindqvist, Sven (1979). "Dig Where You Stand". Oral History. 7 (2): 24–30. ISSN 0143-0955. JSTOR 40178565.
- Lindqvist, Sven (1989). Grabe wo du stehst: Handbuch zur Erforschung der eigenen Geschichte. Manfred Dammeyer (trans.). Bonn: Dietz. ISBN 978-3-8012-0144-9.
- Lindqvist, Sven; Binette, René; Drolet, Danièle; Écomusée de la maison du fier monde; Service aux collectivités de l'Université du Québec (1990). Exposer son histoire. Montréal: Écomusée de la maison du fier monde : Service aux collectivités de l'Université du Québec. ISBN 978-2-920370-18-0.
- Lindqvist, Sven (2014). "Dig Where You Stand Movement". The SAGE Encyclopedia of Action Research. Thousand Oaks: SAGE Publications Ltd. p. 266. doi:10.4135/9781446294406. ISBN 9781849200271.
- Lindqvist, Sven (2017). Dig Where You Stand: How to Research a Job (PDF). Translated by Ann Henning Jocelyn. (preliminary English translation, without notes or illustrations)
- Lindqvist, Sven (2023). Andrew Flinn; Astrid Von Rosen (eds.). Dig Where You Stand: How to Research a Job. Repeater Books. p. 394. (English translation)
- Merrick, John (2021). "Digging where we stand: talking about our labour". Autonomy.
- Norquay, Naomi (2002). "'Dig Where You Stand': Challenging the Myth of the 'White Pioneer'". Northern Terminus: The African Canadian History Journal. 1.
- Rosen, Astrid von (2017-07-14). "'Dream no small dreams!' Impossible archival imaginaries in dance community archiving in a digital age". Rethinking Dance History.
- Thompson, Paul (1978). "Life Histories in Poland and Scandinavia". History Workshop (6): 208–210. ISSN 0309-2984. JSTOR 4288202.
- Wüstenberg, Jenny (2017). "Dig Where You Stand: The History Movement and Grassroots Memorialization". Civil Society and Memory in Postwar Germany. Cambridge: Cambridge University Press. pp. 127–177. doi:10.1017/9781316822746.005. ISBN 9781316822746.
