= Exterminate All the Brutes (book) =

Non-fiction book by Sven Lindqvist

Exterminate All The Brutes
- Author: Sven Lindqvist
- Translator: Joan Tate
- Language: English
- Subjects: Colonialism, Genocide, Racism
- Publisher: New Press
- Publication date: April 1, 1996
- Publication place: USA
- ISBN: 978-1565843349

Exterminate All the Brutes is a book by Swedish author Sven Lindqvist. A historical and philosophical investigation of the roots of European colonialism, racism, and genocide in Africa, it was originally published in Swedish under the title Utrota varenda jävel in 1992 and was published in English translation in 1996. The book takes its title from the infamous phrase used by the character Kurtz in Joseph Conrad's 1899 Heart of Darkness.

== Overview ==
Lindqvist explores the history of European racism from the late eighteenth century to the twentieth century. In the same vein as Edward Said's Orientalism, Lindqvist contextualizes Conrad's Heart of Darkness and examines the impact of European explorers, theologians, politicians, and historians on the development of racist ideologies. Lindqvist's aim is to help readers comprehend the statement "Exterminate all the brutes" by tracing its roots back to European colonial policies. Lindqvist's argument echoes that of Hannah Arendt's 1951 The Origins of Totalitarianism but his approach is unique in that he blends his artistic and biographical insights to create a distinct perspective.

The Guardian describes the book as "a travelogue through African geography and European literature, punctuated with fable-like dream sequences."

The historian Adam Hochschild wrote the introduction to the book, where Lindqvist explores the history of European colonialism in Africa, from the earliest explorers to the genocides of the 20th century, examining the ways in which European imperialism relied on the dehumanization of African people and the creation of a racist ideology that justified their exploitation and extermination.

The book looks at how this ideology was reinforced through popular culture and literature, such as the work of Conrad, and argues that it continues to shape contemporary attitudes towards Africa and its people. Lindqvist draws on a wide range of sources, including historical accounts, literature, and personal experience, to analyse the legacy of colonialism in Africa and its ongoing impact on the world.

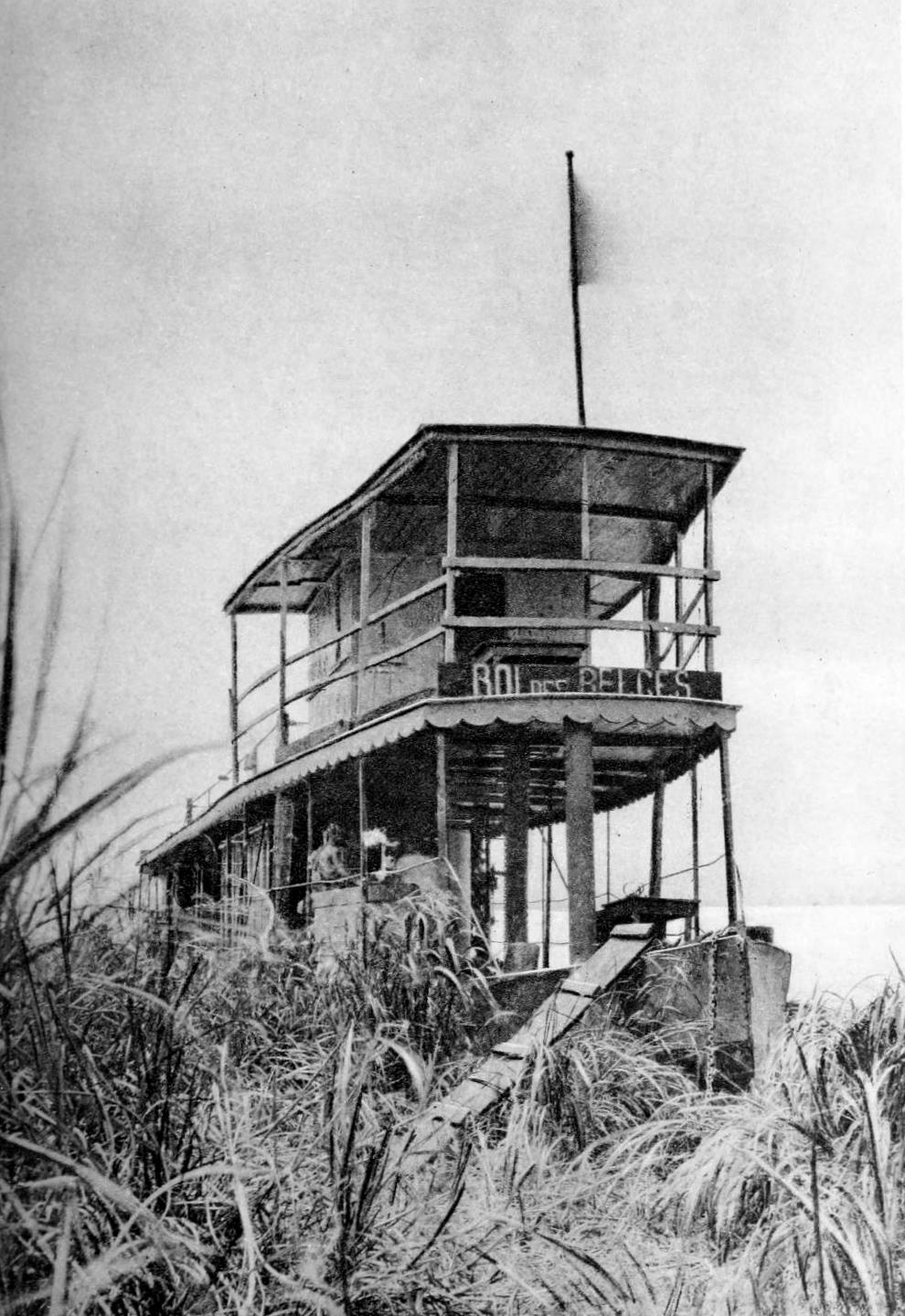
Exterminate all the Brutes revisits the colonial genocidal racism personified by Conrad's Mr Kurtz, who travels up the Congo in a riverboat, as Conrad did in the Roi des Belges (pictured).

The work was Lindqvist's favourite among his books. Its title is taken from a phrase uttered by the murderous racist imperialist Mr Kurtz in Joseph Conrad's 1899 novella Heart of Darkness. As a boy, Lindqvist had seen a photograph of the emaciated corpses at Buchenwald concentration camp. He stated that the image of Nazi atrocity and the novella came together in his mind, and in Exterminate all the Brutes he argues that Hitler grew up in a time when the whole of the Western world was "soaked in the conviction" that imperialism was a biological necessity that inevitably destroyed "the lower races". Lindqvist argued controversially that this had already killed millions in genocides before Hitler's application of the principle to white people, and noted that his book had resulted in academic study of the "effect of colonial atrocities on Nazi crimes".

== Publication history ==
The book was first published by Bonnier in Swedish in 1992 as Utrota varenda jävel.

The first English translation, using Conrad's original English phrase "Exterminate all the brutes" as its title, was published in New York by New Press in 1996.

The book has been translated into Finnish, Danish, Norwegian, Spanish, French, German, Italian, Korean, Portuguese, Croatian, Russian, Polish, Kurdish and English.

== Legacy ==
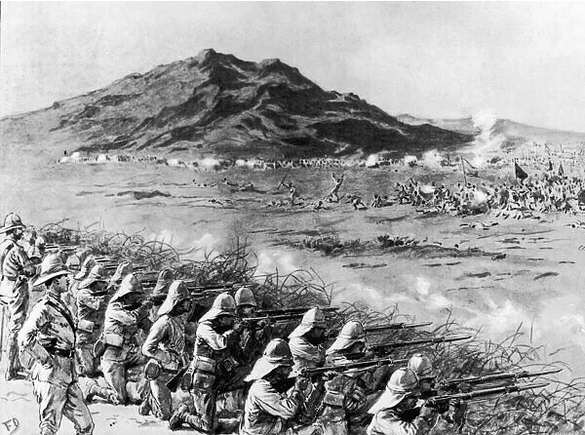
The book is illustrated with historic images, such as this one for The Graphic in 1898 of the Battle of Omdurman by Frank Dadd. Infantry of the British Army are shown firing on the Mahdi's dervishes from the cover of a zeriba fence. The image's caption in the book states that "Machineguns and infantry wiped them out. Whole battalions were destroyed by the murderous fire."

Lindqvist's book Exterminate all the Brutes is included in Jan Gradvall's 2009 Tusen svenska klassiker ("A Thousand Swedish Classics").

Lindqvist continued to examine the history of colonial racism and genocide in the books The Skull Measurer's Mistake (Antirasister: människor och argument i kampen mot rasismen, 1996), A History of Bombing (Nu dog du: bombernas århundrade, 2001), Terra Nullius (2007), and Intent to Destroy (Avsikt att förinta, 2008).

Dramatizations of the content have been performed on stage in Sweden and France. In the spring of 2020, it was announced that the filmmaker Raoul Peck based a documentary series for HBO – about the history of European colonialism – on, among other things, Lindqvist's book. The award-winning television series "Exterminate All the Brutes" is eponymous with the book. Lindqvist appears as himself in the series cast.

== See also ==
- Cultural hegemony
- White supremacy
- White nationalism

== Bibliography ==
- Lindqvist, Sven (1996). Exterminate all the brutes. New Press, New York. ISBN 978-156584359-2
- Said, Edward (1978). Orientalism. Pantheon Books. ISBN 978-039442814-7
