= Steven Mintz =

American historian (born 1953)

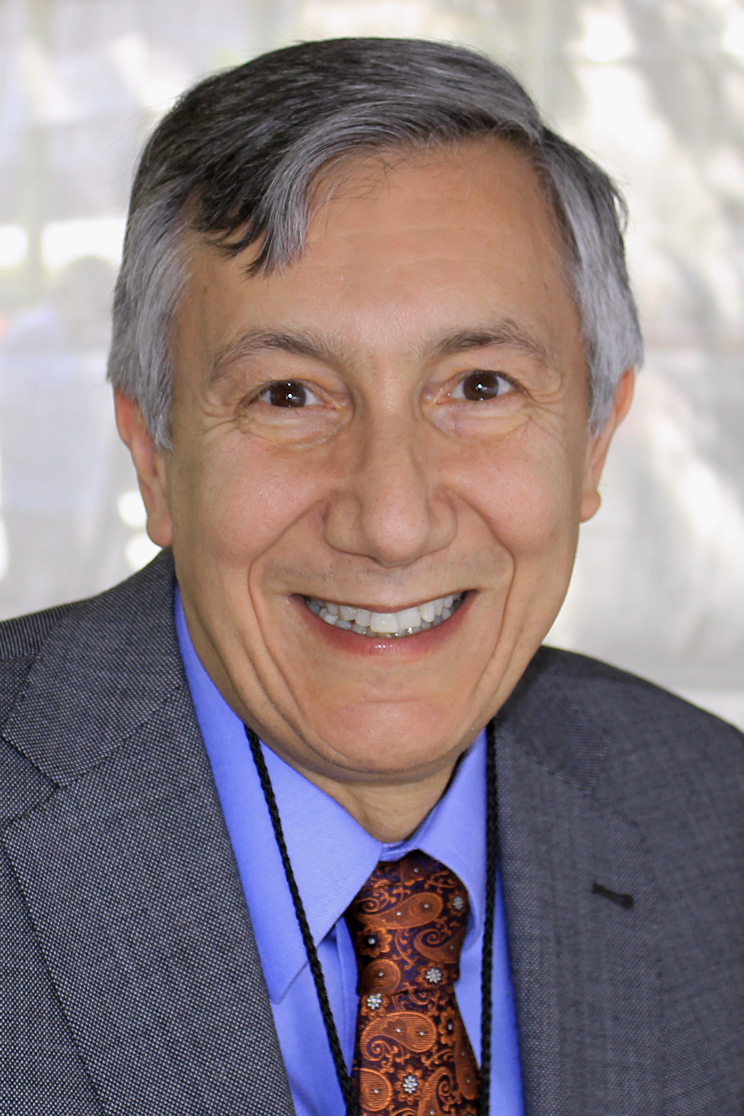
- Mintz at the 2015 Texas Book Festival
- Born: 1953 (age 72–73); Detroit, Michigan, U.S.
- Occupation: Historian

Steven Mintz (born 1953) is an American historian at the University of Texas at Austin. For five years, from 2012 through 2017, he served as executive director of the University of Texas System's Institute for Transformational Learning. This institute is tasked with delivering a high-quality education that is more affordable and accessible across the System's 14 academic campuses and health science centers. He previously taught history at Oberlin College, University of Houston, and Columbia University, where he directed the Graduate School of Arts and Sciences Teaching Center. He has also held visiting appointments at Pepperdine University and the University of Siegen in Germany, been a visiting scholar at the Minda de Gunzburg Center for European Studies at Harvard University, and a fellow at the Center for Advanced Study in the Behavioral Sciences at Stanford University.

In addition to a commitment to pedagogy, interests on which he has published widely include the history of the American family and children, film and history, immigration, and ethnic history.

== Life ==
Born into a Jewish family in Detroit, Michigan, he received his B.A. from Oberlin College (1973) and his M.A., M.Phil., and Ph.D. degrees from Yale University (1979). At Oberlin, where he wrote his senior thesis on the Harlem Renaissance novelist Jean Toomer, he was elected to Phi Beta Kappa and graduated Senior Scholar in History. At Yale, he completed his dissertation, "Studies in the Victorian Family," under the direction of David Brion Davis. It was published as A Prison of Expectations: The Family in Victorian Culture in 1983.

After serving as a visiting assistant professor of history at Oberlin College (1978–1980), he joined the History Department at the University of Houston (1981–2007). He became the John and Rebecca Moores Professor of History and Director of the American Cultures Program, which offers comparative perspectives on the peoples and cultures of the Western Hemisphere.

In 1985–1986, he was a guest professor at University of Siegen, and in 1989–1990, he was at Harvard's Minda de Gunzburg Center for European Studies and also taught in Harvard Extension School. In 2006–2007, he was a fellow at the Center for Advanced Study in the Behavioral Sciences at Stanford University. In addition, he taught summer courses at Pepperdine University (1994) and summer institutes for the Gilder Lehrman Institute of American History (1995 to 2004) at Yale, Columbia, and Rice universities on slavery, film history, and digital history. He was named director of Columbia University's Graduate School of Arts and Sciences Teaching Center and a member of the History Department in 2008.

In September 2012, he became the founding director of the University of Texas System's Institute for Transformational Learning, which was established to promote the use of new technologies and active learning and inquiry- and project-based pedagogies to improve student learning outcomes, accelerate time to degree, and foster innovation across the System's eight academic campuses and six health science centers. He also received tenure in the History Department of the University of Texas at Austin.

He married Maria Elena Solino, a professor at the University of Houston and an authority on Spanish literature and film, in 2009.

== Scholarship ==
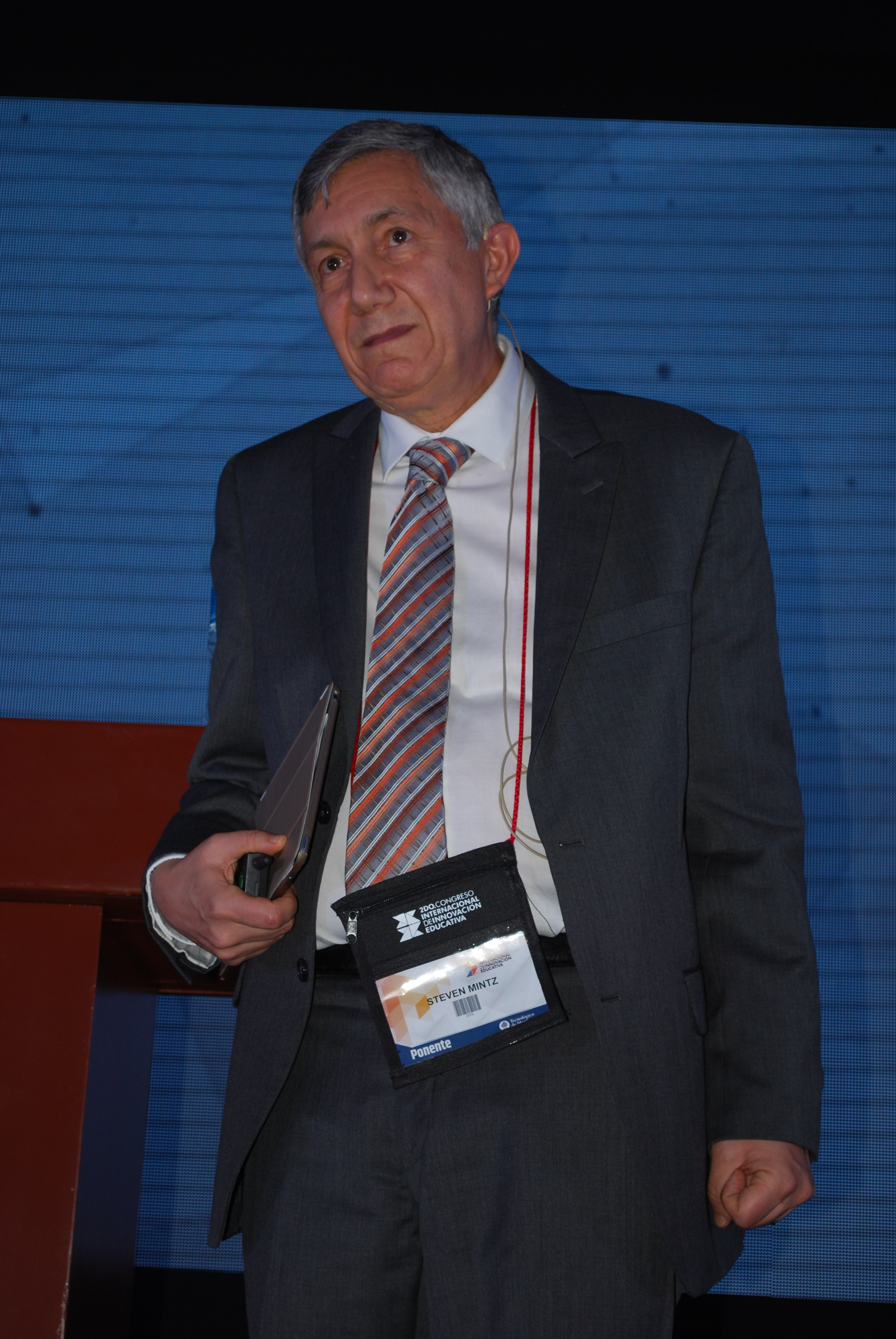
Stephen Mintz presenting at the 2o Congreso de la Innovación Educativa at Tec de Monterrey, Campus Ciudad de Mexico

A cultural historian trained in the methods of the new social history, he is the author and editor of 14 history books, focusing on such topics as families and children, antebellum reform, slavery and antislavery, ethnicity, and film. His first book, A Prison of Expectations: The Family in Victorian Culture (1983), examined the psychological dynamics within a series of prominent literary families in Britain and the United States against a backdrop of broader cultural concerns about authority, discipline, and legitimacy. This volume, an early attempt to apply the concept of Victorianism to the study of mid-nineteenth-century American culture, also sought to explore the links between familial experience and literary expression and reveal how family conflicts embodied religious and cultural tensions.

His next book, Domestic Revolutions: A Social History of American Family Life (1988), co-authored with Susan Kellogg, was the first comprehensive history of the American family since 1917. Underscoring ethnic, class, and temporal diversity in family life, this volume identified a series of major shifts in family structure and composition, roles and functions, and emotional and power dynamics over the past three-and-a-half centuries. According to Anne M. Boylan:

Usable as a text in family history courses (or indeed in any course on the family), Mintz and Kellogg's work deserves to find readers in many quarters beyond the university classroom, and should find its way onto the desks of policy makers. Scholarly and thoughtful, the book cuts through much of the confusion and many of the assumptions that surround current debates on family policy, and provides historical background essential for understanding recent developments.

His history of antebellum reform, Moralists and Modernizers: America's Pre-Civil War Reformers (1995), portrayed reform as a vehicle for cultural and institutional modernization, the definition of middle-class values and identity, and the moral legitimization of new ideas about labor, poverty, deviance, and disorder. The Boisterous Sea of Liberty: A Documentary History of America from Colonization to the Civil War (1998), co-authored with David Brion Davis, used primary source documents from the Gilder Lehrman Collection to examine the role of race in early American history, politics, and culture; to trace the evolution of new conceptions of rights, including the notion of inalienable rights rooted in the laws of nature, minority rights, and the right to revolution; and the meanings, institutionalizations, and uses of power, including the invention of the people as a source of sovereign power, the growing power of public opinion, and the power of moral ideals.

Mintz wrote the chapters covering the periods 1790 to 1860 and 1960 to the present in America and Its Peoples (6th edition, 2006), a college textbook, and published a number of anthologies, including a collection of essays on film and history, volumes of annotated primary sources on slavery, Native American history, and Mexican American history, and a collection of original essays dealing with race, slavery and abolition, and reform, entitled The Problem of Evil: Slavery, Freedom, and the Ambiguities of American Reform (2007), co-edited with John Stauffer.

Huck's Raft (2004), his history of children and youth in America from the colonial era to the present, examined childhood both as lived experience — shaped by such factors as class, ethnicity, gender, geographical region, and historical era — and as a cultural category imposed upon children. In addition to giving historical perspective to current psychological and legal thinking about childhood, the volume charted the evolution of public policy, tracing changes in ideas and practices involving adoption, child abuse and neglect, children's rights, disability, juvenile delinquency, schooling, and social welfare policies. Anne Lombard in The American Historical Review praised Huck's Raft:

Steven Mintz's impeccably researched, convincingly argued, and wonderfully original synthesis of the monographic literature on childhood in American history [is]....one of those rare histories that both engages with academic historical scholarship in a serious way and speaks to real concerns of the American reading public. Full of fascinating information about the history of children in America, it also offers a major critique of the way our society constructs childhood. This book reminds us that history can teach important lessons about how we got to be the way we are—and, sometimes, even suggest what to do about it.

The Prime of Life: A History of Modern Adulthood (2015), a New York Times Book Review Editor's Choice, explores how past generations navigated the transition to adulthood, achieved intimacy and connection, raised children, sought meaning in work, and responded to loss. In tracing the rise and fall of a set of norms and expectations surrounding adulthood, the book engages with a series of questions that have evoked a great deal of concern in recent years: Why it has grown harder to become an adult; whether intimate friendship is fraying in today's hyperindividualistic, highly mobile, work-centered society; why marriages are so difficult to sustain; why parenting is so anxiety-ridden; and why adult life seems so stressful when many of the physical hardships faced by earlier generations have faded.

A past president of H-Net: Humanities and Social Sciences Online, he is the creator of the Digital History website, which was named one of the Top Five U.S. history websites by Best of History Web Sites and included on the NEH's EdSITEment list of exemplary online resources in the humanities. He has also served as a consultant to the National Museum of American History, the Minnesota Historical Center, the New-York Historical Society, the New Jersey Historical Society, and the Strong National Museum of Play.

The past president of the Society for the History of Children and Youth, he previously served as national co-chair of the Council on Contemporary Families (2004–2009), an organization of researchers and clinicians dedicated to enhancing the national conversation on the United States's diverse families. A board member of Film and History, the Gilder Lehrman Institute of American History, the Journal of Family Life, the Society for History Education, and Slavery & Abolition, he has also chaired the Organization of American Historians Teaching Committee (2007–2008) and served on the American Historical Association's Nominating Committee (2006–2008) and chaired the Organization of American Historians's Committee on Committees (2014-2015).

== Awards ==
- 2005 The Organization of American Historians Merle Curti Award
- 2005 The Association of American Publishers R.R. Hawkins Award
- 2005 The Texas Institute of Letters Carr P. Collins Award

== Works ==
- The Prime of Life: A History of Modern Adulthood. Harvard University Press. 2004. ISBN 978-0-674-04767-9.
- Huck's Raft: A History of American Childhood. Harvard University Press. 2004. ISBN 978-0-674-01508-1.
- James Kirby Martin; Randy W. Roberts; Steven Mintz; James H. Jones; Linda O. McMurry (2006). America and its Peoples. Longman. ISBN 978-0-321-16213-7.
- Steven Mintz; Susan Kellogg (1989). Domestic Revolutions: A Social History of American Family Life. Simon and Schuster. ISBN 978-0-02-921291-2.
- Moralists and Modernizers: America's Pre-Civil War Reformers. JHU Press. 1995. ISBN 978-0-8018-5081-3. "Steven Mintz."
- Mintz, Steven (1983). A Prison of Expectation: The Family in Victorian Culture. ISBN 978-0-8147-5388-0.

=== Edited ===
- Steven Mintz; Randy W. Roberts, eds. (2010). Hollywood's America: United States history Through its Films. Wiley-Blackwell. ISBN 978-1-881089-68-1.
- Steven Mintz; John Stauffer, eds. (2007). The Problem of Evil: Slavery, Freedom, and the Ambiguities of American Reform. University of Massachusetts Press. ISBN 978-1-55849-570-8.
- David Brion Davis; Steven Mintz, eds. (2000). The Boisterous Sea of Liberty: A Documentary History of America from Discovery through the Civil War. Oxford University Press. ISBN 978-0-19-511670-0.
- Steven Mintz, ed. (2009). Mexican American Voices: A Documentary Reader. Wiley-Blackwell. ISBN 978-1-4051-8260-7.
- Steven Mintz, ed. (2000). Native American Voices: A History and Anthology. Brandywine Press. ISBN 978-1-881089-59-9.
- Steven Mintz, ed. (2009). African American Voices: A Documentary Reader, 1619-1877. Wiley-Blackwell. ISBN 978-1-4051-8268-3.
- Steven Mintz, ed. (2002). A History of Us: Sourcebook and Index: Documents That Shaped the American Nation. Oxford University Press. ISBN 978-0-19-515340-8.
- Steven Mintz; John Ettling, eds. (1989). Critical Issues in American History. Kendall Hunt. ISBN 978-0-8403-5468-6.

=== Scholarly articles ===
- "Reflections on age as a category of historical analysis." The Journal of the History of Childhood and Youth 1.1 (2008): 91-94. onlineexcerpt
- "Children, Families and the State: American Family Law in Historical Perspective." Denver University Law Review 69 (1992): 635-661. online
- "Regulating the American family." Journal of Family History14.4 (1989): 387-408.
