= Aygi =

Aygi is a Chuvash language surname. Notable people with the surname include:

- Alexei Aygi (born 1971), Russian composer and violinist
- Gennadiy Aygi, Chuvash poet, writer and translator
