= Éric Guichard =

French cinematographer

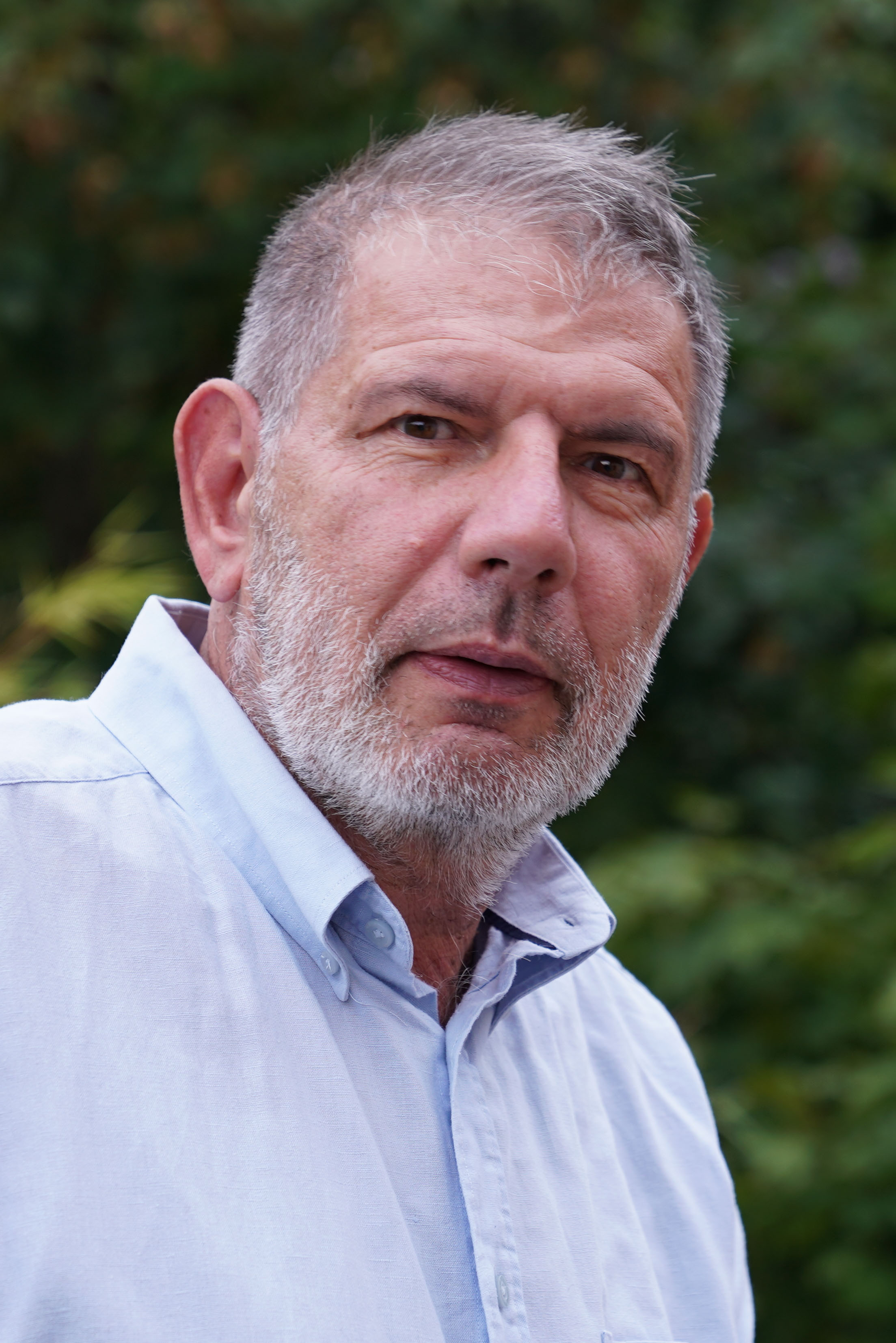
- Occupation: Cinematographer
- Years active: 1986–present

Éric Guichard is a French cinematographer.

== Selected filmography ==
- 1986: Polvere di stelle by Agnès Merlet
- 1987: Il était une fois dix neuf acteurs (TV)
- 1993: Doudou perdu
- 1993: Latcho Drom
- 1995: Post-scriptum
- 1995: Mondo
- 1996: Rainbow pour Rimbaud
- 1996: Le Vent de l'oubli (TV)
- 1996: Méfie-toi de l'eau qui dort
- 1997: Tortilla y cinema
- 1997: Gadjo Dilo
- 1998: Het ondergrondse orkest
- 1998: Tueurs de petits poissons
- 1999: D'ailleurs, Derrida
- 1999: Fleurs de sel (TV)
- 1999: La Femme de plume (TV)
- 1999: Himalaya : L'Enfance d'un chef
- 1999: Je suis né d'une cigogne
- 2000: La Squale
- 2001: Intimisto
- 2001: La Fille de son père
- 2001: 17 rue Bleue
- 2002: Les Diables
- 2003: Fureur
- 2003: Vacances mortelles (TV)
- 2004: Terre et cendres (Khakestar-o-khak)
- 2005: Quelques jours en avril (TV)
- 2005: Le Cactus
- 2006: La Piste (The Trail)
- 2006: Paris, je t'aime
- 2006: Une naissance
- 2007: J'veux pas que tu t'en ailles
- 2007: Enfances
- 2007: Divine Émilie (TV)
- 2008: L'Empreinte de l'ange by Safy Nebbou
- 2008: La Possibilité d'une île by Michel Houellebecq
- 2009: L'École du pouvoir (TV) by Raoul Peck
- 2009: Erreur de la banque en votre faveur by Gérard Bitton and Michel Munz
- 2009: Pour un fils by Alix de Maistre
- 2009: Moloch Tropical by Raoul Peck (TV)
- 2010: L'amour c'est mieux à deux by Dominique Farrugia and Arnaud Lemort
- 2012: Dans la tourmente by Christophe Ruggia
- 2012: Plan de table by Christelle Raynal
- 2012: Dépression et des potes by Arnaud Lemort
- 2013: Belle and Sebastian by Nicolas Vanier
- 2013: La voix des steppes by Ermek Shinarbaev
- 2014: Murder in Pacot by Raoul Peck
- 2016: Les Saisons by Jacques Perrin
- 2017: L'école buissonnière by Nicolas Vanier
