= Mireille Métellus =

Haitian-Canadian actress

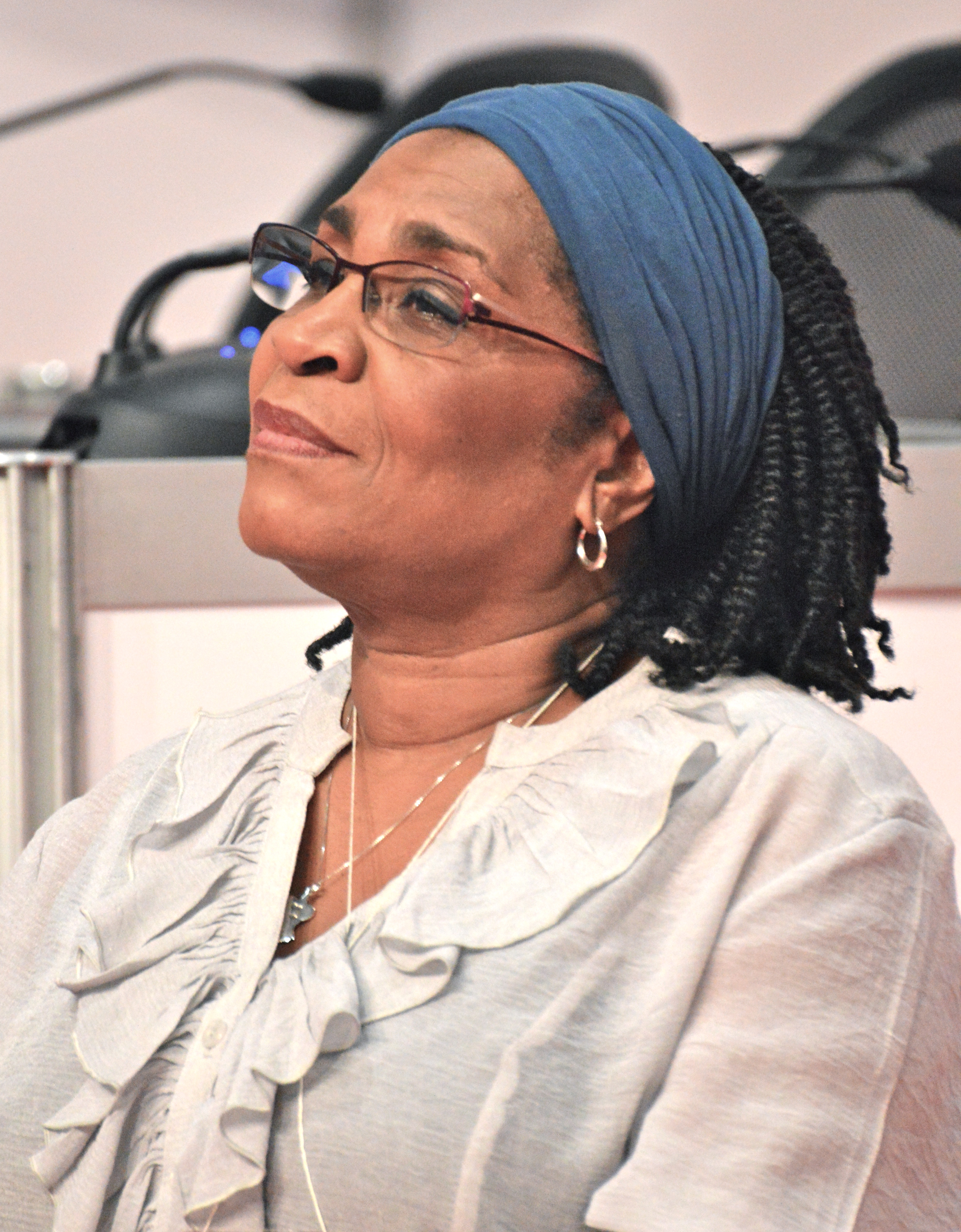
- Mireille Métellus in 2014
- Born: Port-au-Prince, Haiti
- Occupation: Actress
- Years active: 1980s–present

Mireille Métellus is a Haitian Canadian actress based in Montreal, Quebec, who was inducted into the Conseil des arts et des lettres du Québec in 2025.

Born in Port-au-Prince, she moved to Canada in the late 1960s with her family, becoming a close friend of Michaëlle Jean and Sonya Biddle in the 1970s. She trained as a special education teacher concurrently with launching her acting career, first in Haitian community theatre projects with Montreal's Maison d’Haïti before branching out into the city's mainstream theatre community.

Her first major film role was as Aunt Elide in Raoul Peck's 1993 film The Man by the Shore (L'Homme sur les quais). Her later film roles included On the Verge of a Fever (Le goût des jeunes filles), A Sunday in Kigali (Un dimanche à Kigali), and This House (Cette maison).

In 2019 she played Lena in Héritage, a French translation by Mishka Lavigne of A Raisin in the Sun, for Montreal's Théàtre Jean-Duceppe, opposite Frédéric Pierre as Walter, Myriam de Verger as Ruth, and Patrick Emmanuel Abéllard as George.

== Filmography ==
=== Film ===
Year	Title	Role	Notes
1993	The Man by the Shore (L'Homme sur les quais)	Aunt Elide	
1998	When I Will Be Gone (L'Âge de braise)	Béatrice	
2001	The Hidden Fortress (La forteresse suspendue)	Mme Toussaint	
2004	On the Verge of a Fever (Le goût des jeunes filles)	Fanfan's mother	
2004	White Skin (La Peau blanche)	Henri's mother	
2006	A Sunday in Kigali (Un dimanche à Kigali)	Agathe	
2008	Afterwards (Et après...)	Haitian woman	
2009	Moloch Tropical	Rachel Corvington	
2010	Opening Up (M'ouvrir)	Rita	
2012	Exile (Exil)	Angeline	
2015	The Heart of Madame Sabali (Le Cœur de Madame Sabali)	Madame Sabali	
2018	Three Is a Crowd (Deux sans trois)	Yolette	
2021	Fanmi	Monique	
2022	This House (Cette maison)	Mireille	
2022	No Ghost in the Morgue	Myriam	
2023	My Mother's Men (Les hommes de ma mère)	Nana	
2024	The Last Meal (Le dernier repas)	Tati Dado	

=== Television ===
Year	Title	Role	Notes
1993	Chambres en ville	Mireille	One episode
1994	Sous un ciel variable	Dr. Lamont	Three episodes
1995-96	Les Héritiers Duval	Caresse Désir	12 episodes
2003	ER	Actress	Episode "Kisangani"
2005	Un tueur si proche	Ida Saint-Louis	One episode
2011-14	Trauma	Latoya/Gloria Jean-Baptiste	Four episodes
2012	Lance et compte: La déchirure	Adéline Beauchesne	Two episodes
2014	Unité 9	Oliver's mother	One episode
2017	Ruptures	Judge Belleau	One episode
2019	Yidlife Crisis	Doctor	One episode
2019	Adulthood (L'Âge adulte)	Max's mother	One episode
2020	Can You Hear Me? (M'entends-tu?)	Nana	Two episodes
2020	Amours d'occasion	Louise	Seven episodes
2020	L'Écrivain public	Marité	Five episodes
2021	Chaos	Khadija	Five episodes
2022-23	Hôtel	Yvette Dorvil	
2022-25	L'œil du cyclone	Célucia	Five episodes
2023	Wipe Me Away (Je voudrais qu'on m'efface)	School director	Two episodes
2023-24	Un gars, une fille	Nurse	Three episodes
2024	La candidate	Angélique	Seven episodes
2024	La terre appelle Mathilde	Marcelline	
2024–present	Lakay Nou	Rose Honoré	29 episodes
