= Velvet Film =

German film production company

Velvet Film is a film production company. It was created 1986 in Berlin, Germany by the Haitian filmmaker and political activist Raoul Peck as Velvet Film GmbH. The company is now based in France, Haiti and in the United States of America. Lumumba, la mort d'un prophète was 1991 the first feature film produced by the company. The film was successfully shown all over Europe and North America and so enabled the partnership of Velvet Film in future production with JBA Production (France), Arte (France and Germany), HBO (USA) and others. All later documentaries, feature films and TV dramas of Peck have been produced or co-produced by Velvet Film.

== Films produced (incomplete) ==
- Haitian Corner (1987)
- Lumumba, la mort d'un prophète (1990)
- The Man by the Shore (1993)
- Desounen: Dialogue with Death (1994)
- Profit & Nothing But! (2001)
- Sometimes in April (2005)
- Moloch Tropical (2009)
- Murder in Pacot (2014)
- Soley (2015)
- I Am Not Your Negro (2016)
- The Young Karl Marx (2017)
- Exterminate All the Brutes (2021)
- Silver Dollar Road (2023)
- Ernest Cole: Lost and Found (2024)
- Orwell: 2+2=5 (2025)
