= Ernest Cole: Lost and Found =

2024 documentary film

- Film poster
- Directed by: Raoul Peck
- Written by: Raoul Peck
- Based on: Ernest Cole archives
- Produced by: Raoul Peck; Tamara Rosenberg
- Narrated by: LaKeith Stanfield
- Cinematography: Wolfgang Held; Moses Tau
- Edited by: Alexandra Strauss
- Music by: Alexei Aigui
- Production companies: Velvet Film; Arte France Cinéma
- Distributed by: Magnolia Pictures (United States); Condor Distribution (France)
- Release dates: May 20, 2024 (Cannes); November 22, 2024 (United States); December 25, 2024 (France)
- Running time: 105 minutes
- Countries: France; United States
- Language: English
- Box office: $348,603

Ernest Cole: Lost and Found is a 2024 documentary film produced, written and directed by Raoul Peck. It follows Ernest Cole, a South African independent photographer who exposed the horrors of the Apartheid in South Africa during the 1960s and 1970s. It is narrated by LaKeith Stanfield.

The documentary had its world premiere in the Special Screenings section of the 2024 Cannes Film Festival on May 20, 2024, where it won the L'Œil d'or for Best Documentary. At the 50th César Awards it was nominated in the Best Documentary Film category.

It was theatrically released in the United States on November 22, 2024, by Magnolia Pictures, and in France on December 25, 2024, by Condor Distribution.

== Premise ==
Ernest Cole exposes the horror of Apartheid through photographs, which resulted in him fleeing to the United States to avoid the then ongoing persecution of black media members in South Africa. Most of his work stayed unpublished until 2017, when 60,000 negatives were found in a Swedish bank safe.

== Production ==
In May 2023, it was announced Raoul Peck would direct a documentary revolving around Ernest Cole, with Magnolia Pictures set to distribute in the United States. The documentary is produced in collaboration with the Cole estate, through which Peck gained full access to his archive.

In February 2024, it was announced LaKeith Stanfield would voice Cole.

== Release ==
It had its world premiere at the Cannes Film Festival in the Special Screenings section on May 20, 2024. It was released in the United States on November 22, 2024, and was released in France on December 25, 2024.

== Reception ==
=== Critical response ===
On the review aggregator website Rotten Tomatoes, 97% of 38 critics' reviews are positive. The website's consensus reads: "Ernest Cole: Lost and Found is a devastating yet essential portrait that blends archival sources with sleek direction and engrossing narration to plumb the depths of its subject's inner life and his groundbreaking photographic activism." Metacritic, which uses a weighted average, assigned the film a score of 82 out of 100, based on 11 critics, indicating "universal acclaim".

=== Accolades ===
Award	Date of ceremony	Category	Recipient(s)	Result	Ref.
Cannes Film Festival	May 24, 2024	L'Œil d'or (Note: Shared with The Brink of Dreams.)	Raoul Peck	Won	
César Awards	February 28, 2025	Best Documentary Film	Raoul Peck	Nominated	
