= Silver Dollar Road =

2023 film by Raoul Peck

- Theatrical release poster
- Directed by: Raoul Peck
- Written by: Raoul Peck
- Based on: Kicked Off The Land by Lizzie Presser
- Produced by: Raoul Peck; Blair Foster; Rémi Grellety; Hebert Peck
- Cinematography: Henry Adebonojo; Antonio Rossi
- Edited by: Alexandra Strauss
- Music by: Alexei Aigui
- Production companies: Amazon MGM Studios; Velvet Film; ProPublica; JuVee Productions
- Distributed by: Amazon MGM Studios
- Release dates: September 8, 2023 (TIFF); October 13, 2023 (United States)
- Running time: 100 minutes
- Country: United States
- Language: English

Silver Dollar Road is a 2023 American documentary film written, directed and co-produced by Raoul Peck, based on the ProPublica (in collaboration with The New Yorker) article "Kicked Off The Land" by Lizzie Presser. The film follows a water front property passed through generations in the Reels family, becomes subject to harassment by land developers. Viola Davis serves as an executive producer.

It had its world premiere at the 2023 Toronto International Film Festival on September 8, 2023, and was given a limited theatrical release on October 13, 2023, by Amazon MGM Studios, prior to streaming on Prime Video on October 20, 2023.

== Plot ==
For generations, a waterfront property in North Carolina, known as Silver Dollar Road, is passed through generations in the Reels Family. Developers seek out the land, and begin to harass the family, leading the Reels to battle to save their land. The film draws upon reporting by Lizzie Presser for ProPublica.

== Production ==
Videographers Mayeta Clark and Katie Campbell filmed Lizzie Presser as she reported on the story, resulting in 90 hours of footage. Initially, Raoul Peck was approached by Amazon Studios, JuVee Productions and ProPublica to executive produce the project. Upon reading Lizzie Presser's reporting, Peck decided to direct the film.

== Release ==
The film had its world premiere at the 2023 Toronto International Film Festival on September 8, 2023. It also screened at the Camden International Film Festival and The Georgia Film Festival on September 15, 2023. It was given a limited theatrical release on October 13, 2023, by Amazon MGM Studios, prior to streaming on Prime Video on October 20, 2023.

== Reception ==
On the review aggregator website Rotten Tomatoes, 81% of 42 critics' reviews are positive, with an average rating of 7/10. The website's consensus reads: "Silver Dollar Road's overwhelming compassion for its subjects helps this powerful story transcend its occasionally uneven telling." Metacritic, which uses a weighted average, assigned the film a score of 77 out of 100, based on 6 critics, indicating "generally favorable" reviews.
