= Toto Bissainthe =

Toto Bissanthe
- Born: Marie Clotilde Bissainthe; April 2, 1934; Cap-Haitien, Haiti
- Died: June 4, 1994 (aged 60); Petion-Ville, Haiti
- Occupations: Actress; singer; songwriter

Toto Bissainthe (April 2, 1934 – June 4, 1994) was a Haitian actress and singer known for her innovative blend of traditional Vodou and rural themes and music with contemporary lyricism and arrangements. Born in Cap-Haïtien in 1934, she left Haiti at an early age to pursue her acting studies abroad. Her career started in theatre with the company Les Griots, of which she was a founding member in 1956. Les Griots was at the vanguard of négritude-inspired cultural institutions in France, and was the first African theatre company in Paris and the first to perform of Jean Genet's play "Les Nègres". She also worked with playwright Samuel Beckett, played a co-starring role in Raoul Peck's "L'homme sur les quais", and worked with other directors such as Roger Blin, and performed in several films.

With a performance in 1973 at La vieille grille in Paris, Toto Bissainthe established herself as singer-songwriter-composer, with her soul-stirring renditions of original compositions that paid homage to the lives, struggles, miseries and spirituality of working class and rural Haitians.

The singer and actress Toto Bissainthe was recognized by many as a champion of Haitian music abroad.

An artist in exile, Toto Bissainthe will be unable to return to the Haiti that so inspired her until the departure of Jean-Claude Duvalier in 1986. However, the multiple disappointments of the unending democratic transition and political infighting would forever embitter the outspoken artist, who had long dreamed of a return to help rebuild her motherland. Saddened by Haiti's social and political degradation, Toto Bissainthe's health would enter a downward spiral ending with her death from liver damage on June 4, 1994. The cause was cirrhosis, her family said.

== Theatre ==
Toto Bissainthe studied acting in France where she founded The Griots with Roger Blain. This was the first black theatre company in France. Some of the plays titled in French included Papa bon Dieux, Les negres, Negres, negres, L’ombre de la ravine, and L’invite de Pierre, among others. She also had some roles in film, including Les tripes au soleil and En l’autre bord .

She began singing in 1962, after a return to Haiti. “Because in my family, we always loved singing and I missed it. I started a little bit by chance: in a hotel…and on that evening I remember that I sang a song”. She continued singing at that hotel once a week for three to four months in French and in Haitian Creole.

== Music ==
Among her albums are Ti Lorai Cale released in 1976, Toto à New York from 1975, Toto chante Haïti from 1977, Haïti Chanté- Chant du Monde published in 1977, and others. Toto was constantly praised in the media for her music. In a 1967 Haitian newspaper, a journalist wrote the following praising her album:

Toto Bissainthe will, at the very least, have the merit of having introduced through song to Haiti, a way that is only reserved to a minority. What will remain of this effort, the evanescent memories of an evening under the stars, a cry thrust in the desert? Do not blame her for lack of passion, but more surely our secular sleep. (Translated from French)

In a document about Toto's album Toto Bissainthe chante Haïti, it is stated, “Toto Bissainthe sings, and the memory of Haiti becomes the memory of the world, or the universal human. Vodou is then revealed, tapped in each one of us” (Translated from French). Some lyrics include, “I cry for the mourning of Haiti/Haiti my dear, your children are dead/and the others are naked/Aytitoma, your blood is in the diaspora/The country is dying/Who will hold the mourning/Haiti has been blinded/Haiti stopped/Haiti was “zombified”/ Who will hold the mourning/Haiti, I call on you/I call on you as you call on me/That you call and reunite your blood/for the great Koumbite” (Translated from French). These are the words for the song Lied Van. This particular album has songs composed with a tamtam, a type of gong.

Toto Bissainthe was very often lauded for being a singer representing the black diaspora. In a newspaper clip from the year 1980, there’s an article titled Toto Bissainthe: The Sortileges of the Black diaspora which states, “Her creation has for ambition to refer to a lost freedom that has yet to be found. For having personally lived in Haitian exile, she searches for a certain authenticity in her music” (Translated from French).

In an interview she stated that she sings for the black people:

Simply because we must. What I speak of is unity. With colonization and all of the cultural alienation that we were subjected to, we became very separated. I see it all over the Antilles. There’s very little people who see themselves as Antilleans. They consider themselves Martiniquais, Guadeloupean, Haitian, Trinidadian, Cuban, etc.

== Activism ==
Toto Bissainthe left her native land during a time of high tensions in Haiti. Francois Duvalier, known as Papa Doc, ran a fascist dictatorship in Haiti from 1957 to 1971. His son Jean-Claude Duvalier, also known as “Baby Doc”, succeeded him from 1971 until he was overthrown by a popular uprising in 1986.

In 1980 the Jean-Claude Duvalier dictatorship forbade all media cricism and began exiling journalists.

In La Vie Ouvriére newspaper, she spoke about her frustration regarding this matter. The interviewer asks her how is it that she was able to sing in Haiti, when he thought that she couldn't. “I can return, but only for one show. I feel frustrated to not be able to give a popular show. So I will return. Right now, with everything that is being said about the regime, they have a bit more attention over their image. And that’s why I can return”, she stated. She then added “All of the people that I love, I would tell them what I want, against the government and all that, and [the government] wouldn’t find that worrisome because they know that the people don’t speak French… Still that can still give some consciousness to some. But as soon as I would sing in Creole, I would make more impact and they immediately banned me” (Translate from French) (Catala).

She went on to give a concert less than 2 months before the fall of the Duvalier regime at the Rex Theatre. At this concert she told people her message of justice, hope, love, life and revolt. The concert concluded with a standing ovation. She returned to Haiti indefinitely after the regime had ended.

In what she called a “slow return”, “she pursued creative work with the support of her spouse, the American journalist Michael Norton”. She also collaborated with artists and writers such as Syto Cavé and Lyonel Trouillot.

== Personal life and death ==
Toto Bissainthe married American journalist Michael Norton; he died in 2008 at the age of 66 years. Toto is survived by her two daughters. Milena (who operates the official Toto Bissainthe website) and Souqhaina, and her three grandchildren.

Toto died from cirrhosis at the age of 60 in 1994.

== Discography ==
- Toto à New York (Chango, 1975)
- Toto chante Haïti (Arion, 1977, Prix de la chanson TF1 1978, reissued 1989)
- Haïti Chanté - Chant du Monde (reissued, 1995)
- Coda (reissued, 1996)
- World Network Vol. 43: Haiti (with Ti Koka) (World Network, 1999)
- Rétrospective (Créon Music, 2006)

== Bibliography ==
"Toto (Marie-Clotilde) Bissainthe" pp 153–159 in Mémoire de femmes by Jasmine Claude-Narcisse, UNICEF Haïti, 1997

== Filmography ==
- Checkerboard (1959)
- Le théâtre de la jeunesse: La case de l'oncle Tom, Le, 1963.
- La Noire de..., 1966.
- L'homme au contrat, television series, 1974.
- En l'autre bord, 1978.
- West Indies, 1979.
- Toto Bissainthe de Sarah Maldoror (5mn - documentary), 1984.
- Haitian Corner, 1988.
- An Alé de Irène Lichtenstein (16mm - 70mn - documentary), 1990.
- L'homme sur les quais, 1993.
