= Jean-René Lemoine =

Haitian playwright

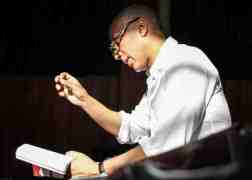
- Lemoine reading one of his texts
- Born: 19 June 1959 (age 67)
- Education: Conservatoire national supérieur d'art dramatique

Jean-René Lemoine is a Haitian director and playwright, who has lived in Paris since 1989.

His comedy Erzuli Dahomey, goddess of love received the SACD prize for French-language dramaturgy in 2009. It entered the repertoire of the Comédie-Française in 2012 (Théâtre du Vieux-Colombier)

== Works ==
- L'Adoration, Carnières, Lansman Editions, «Théâtre à l'affiche», 2003, 35 p. ISBN 978-2-87282-387-1
- Ecchymose, Besançon, Les Solitaires Intempestifs, «Bleue», 2005, 48 p. ISBN 978-2-84681-137-8
- Face à la mère, Besançon, Les Solitaires Intempestifs, «Bleue», 2006, 64 p. ISBN 978-2-84681-176-7
- Erzuli Dahomey, déesse de l'amour, Besançon, Les Solitaires Intempestifs, «Bleue», 2009, 96 p. ISBN 978-2-84681-267-2. SACD prize for French-language dramaturgy, 2009
- Iphigénie, follow In memoriam, Besançon, Les Solitaires Intempestifs, «Bleue», 2012, 64 p. ISBN 978-2-84681-313-6
- Médée poème enragé (follow) Atlantides, Les Solitaires Intempestifs, «Bleue», 2013, 80 p.ISBN 978-2-84681-521-5
- Atlantides (follow) Le Voyage vers Grand-Rivière, Les Solitaires Intempestifs, «Jeunesse», 2014, 64 p. ISBN 978-2-84681-436-2
- Vents contraires, Les Solitaires Intempestifs, «Bleue», 2016, 96 p.

== Filmography ==
=== Actor ===
- 1984: Cinderella '80, dir. of Roberto Malenotti
- 1985: Miranda, dir. of Tinto Brass
- 1992: All Ladies Do It, dir. of Tinto Brass
- 2001: Confession d'un dragueur, dir. of Alain Soral
- 2017: Montparnasse Bienvenue, dir. of Léonor Serraille

=== Screenwriter ===
- 2009: Moloch Tropical, dir. of Raoul Peck

=== Television ===
- 1987: Ellepi, dir. of Roberto Malenotti - film TV
- 2012: 28' - TV series, 1st episode
