= La candidate =

- Genre: Comedy, political comedy, miniseries
- Created by: Isabelle Langlois
- Inspired by: Ruth Ellen Brosseau and her election to the Canadian House of Commons
- Written by: Isabelle Langlois
- Directed by: Sébastien Gagné; Charles-Olivier Michaud
- Country of origin: Canada
- Original language: French
- No. of seasons: 1
- No. of episodes: 10

Production
- Production locations: Quebec, National Assembly of Quebec

Original release
- Network: ICI Radio-Canada Télé
- Release: January 9 – March 12, 2024

La Candidate is a Quebecois comedy television miniseries with 44-minute episodes, created by Isabelle Langlois, directed by Sébastien Gagné and Charles-Olivier Michaud, and broadcast on ICI Radio-Canada Télé from January 9, 2024, to March 12, 2024. The plot focused on Alix Mongeau, a single mother and nail technician who is accidentally elected to the National Assembly of Quebec after agreeing to stand in the fictional constituency of Dufferin as a paper candidate.

== Plot ==
Alix Mongeau is a thirty-year-old single mother and nail technician who, despite her lack of inexperience and lack of interest in politics, is recruited by her high school friend and politician, Benjamin Claveau, to stand as a paper candidate for the Parti Progrès et Démocratie du Québec in the fictional constituency of Dufferin (which she has never been to) as a paper candidate with little odds of winning against a longtime incumbent in order for the party to have more female candidates. In a political upset, she is elected while getting drunk in New York City on the evening of her 30th birthday. Throughout the series, she manages an entirely new world of politics and government while trying to help her constituents and stay connected with her personal life.

== Cast ==
- Catherine Chabot as Alix Mongeau, a tail technician and single mother is who surprisingly elected as a member of the National Assembly of Quebec for Dufferin despite having no interest in politics or political experience
- Olivier Gervais-Courchesne as Benjamin Claveau, a childhood friend of Alix Mongeau who is member of the National Assembly of Quebec representing the Parti Progrès et Démocratie du Québec
- Valérie Tellos as Béatrice Ouellet, an outspoken and environmentalist who is a steadfast supporter for the Parti Progrès et Démocratie du Québec
- Ines Talbi as Salima Ranni, an experienced member of parliament who helps tutor and guide Alix Mongeau through politics
- Christian Bégin as Serge Rivest, washed-up poet and alcoholic from Dufferin
- Roger Léger as Raymond Mailloux, an entrepreneur who wants to raze a large forest in Dufferin in order to build a large industrial district that will revive the town's economy
- Patrick Abellard as Judes, a truck driver living with his parents, who is the father of Lou. He initially ran away after learning about her pregnancy, but the two have made amends and see each other as friends
- Hugo Dubé as Claude Fortin, the out-going MP for Dufferin, who loses in a political upset to Alix Mongeau after a series of controversial statements to the press and a scandal that tarnishes his party
- Louis Champagne as Jean-Robert (J-R) Mailloux, an easygoing retired French teacher who volunteers for the Parti Progrès et Démocratie du Québec who is married to Hermance and the ex-husband of Marjolaine
- Lily-Rose Loyer as Lou, Alix Mongeau's fourteen-year-old daughter
- Noé Lira as Léonor "Leo" Acosta, a hairdresser who is Alix Mongeau's childhood friend and godmother to Lou
- Éric Bernier as Hermance, an ex-lawyer who is Jean-Robert Mailloux's spouse and a fellow environmentalist
- Guillaume Laurin as Melville, the son of Marjolaine and Jean-Robert who is deeply attached to his hometown of Dufferin and helps manage tensions within his family
- Marie-France Lambert as Claire Robitaille, the leader of the Parti Progrès et Démocratie du Québec
- Isabelle Vincent as Marjolaine Dubé, a businesswoman who is the ex-wife of Jean-Robert Mailloux, mother of Melville, and wife of Raymond Mailloux
- Guy Jodoin as Minister Jarry, the Minister of Municipal Affairs for the ruling party
- Maka Kotto as Aimé, Judes' father
- Mireille Métellus as Angélique, the grandmother of Lou and mother of Judes who dislikes Alix and her decision to enter politics
