= Hébert Peck =

Haitian filmmaker (born 1958)

Hébert Peck Jr. (born 1958) is a Haitian filmmaker. He produced the critically acclaimed documentary film, I Am Not Your Negro, which he received a Best Documentary Feature nomination at the 89th Academy Awards, together with director Raoul Peck and producer Rémi Grellety.

== Early life and education ==
Born to Hébert B. Peck and Gisele Michel, the family moved to the Congo in the early 1960s to escape the dictatorship of Haitian President "Papa Doc" Duvalier. His brothers (including filmmaker Raoul Peck) lived and attended school in the Congo and Orléans, France. Peck finished secondary school in Queens, NY (Hillcrest High School) before attending Ohio University on a soccer scholarship and graduate school at Brooklyn College, NY.

Peck married Kathleen J. Farrell (deceased 2003) and they have two children, Nathalie Michel and Hebert III.

== Career ==
Hébert Peck Jr. built his career on public broadcasting, social issue video and documentary filmmaking.

For Velvet Film he co-produced the Academy Award nominated documentary film I Am Not Your Negro (2016) about the life of James Baldwin and narrated by Samuel L. Jackson. Also for Velvet Film, he co-produced the documentary film FATAL ASSISTANCE (2013 Berlinale) and also narrated the English version of the film. He produced the video essay, LITTLE HEBERT about the birth of his son with Down Syndrome. The short film has been shown on public television, screened at festivals internationally, and "the power of the Pecks' experience, encapsulated in 13 minutes of film, is used at schools in New Jersey and Pennsylvania to help teachers and parents gain insight into the diagnosis".

Peck produced eight seasons of Philadelphia Stories, a 13-hour series of documentaries and short films for public television (WYBE-TV35) MiND TV.

For eight years he managed the operations of The Scribe Video Center, a media arts center in Philadelphia founded by documentary filmmaker and MacArthur Fellow, Louis Massiah. He facilitated the production of over 50 film/video documentaries by independent media makers and members of community organizations and instructed video production.

Peck has created television series, short form documentaries and web-based projects for Rutgers University's iTV Studio that aired internationally through the Research Channel and regionally on public television. Peck also teaches Television Production, as an Adjunct Faculty for the Rutgers University's iTV Studio's production classes.

He completed one term as the co-president on the Board of Directors of the National Alliance for Media Arts and Culture and has served on an advisory capacity in such areas as film, video and multimedia production funding for the Rockefeller Foundation, the National Endowment for the Arts (NEA) and The National Academy of Television Arts and Sciences (NATAS).

In addition to his work as a producer, Peck oversees the Rutgers University Television Network and runs Orélus Media, a production and media consulting company. He resides in Voorhees Township, New Jersey.

== Filmography ==
- Little Hérbert, Video Essay,1994
- Round Ball on Grass, Documentary short, 1994.
- Struggles of the Shadows: Philadelphia’s Free African Youth, Documentary Short, 1998
- Philadelphia Stories, Television Series, 8 seasons: 1996 - 2011
- Right To Know, Documentary Short, 2003
- St. Benedict Prep: 130 Years Of Changing Young Lives, Documentary Short, 2006
- Mary Starke Harper: In Her Own Words, Documentary Short, 2006
- Our Watershed: A Renaissance On The Raritan, 2013
- Fatal Assistance, Documentary Feature, 2013
- Our Life Now, Documentary Short, 2016
- I Am Not Your Negro, Documentary Feature, 2016

== Awards and nominations ==
Year	Award	Category	Work	Recipients and nominees	Outcome
2016	ACE Eddie Awards	Outstanding Achievement in Nonfiction Feature Filmmaking	I Am Not Your Negro	Shared with: Raoul Peck; Rémi Grellety	Nominated
2016	Gotham Independent Film Awards	Best Documentary	I Am Not Your Negro	Shared with: Raoul Peck; Rémi Grellety	Nominated
2016	Gotham Independent Film Awards	Audience Award	I Am Not Your Negro	Shared with: Raoul Peck; Rémi Grellety	Nominated
2016	Academy Awards	Best Documentary Feature	I Am Not Your Negro	Shared with: Raoul Peck; Rémi Grellety	Nominated
2016	International Documentary Association	Best Feature Film	I Am Not Your Negro	Shared with: Raoul Peck; Rémi Grellety	Nominated
