= Murder in Pacot =

- Poster for world premiere at 2014 Toronto International Film Festival
- Directed by: Raoul Peck
- Written by: Raoul Peck; Lyonel Trouillot; Pascal Bonitzer
- Based on: Teorema by Pier Paolo Pasolini
- Starring: Joy Olasunmibo Ogunmakin; Alex Descas; Thibault Vinçon; Lovely Kermonde Fifi; Zinedine Soualem
- Cinematography: Éric Guichard
- Edited by: Alexandra Strauss
- Music by: Alexeï Aïgui
- Production companies: Velvet Film; Figuier Production; Ape&Bjørn
- Distributed by: Doc&Film International
- Release date: 5 September 2014 (TIFF)
- Running time: 130 minutes
- Country: Haiti
- Languages: French; Haitian Creole

Murder in Pacot (French: Meurtre à Pacot, German: Mord in Haiti) is a feature film by Haitian film director Raoul Peck. The film stars Joy Olasunmibo Ogunmakin, Alex Descas, Thibault Vinçon, and Lovely Kermonde Fifi and is a continuation of the theme Peck featured in his last documentary, Assistance Mortelle (Fatal Assistance), on international aid to Haiti following the earthquake of 12 January 2010 which opened at New York's Film Society of Lincoln Center in February 2014. The lead producers of the joint Haitian, French and Norwegian production were Peck and Remi Grellety.

The story, a traditional stranger-comes-to-town plot line examining how the earthquake upended Haiti's strongly divided class system, is loosely inspired by the 1968 mystery Teorema by Italian director Pier Paolo Pasolini. In that screenplay, which Pasolini adapted from his own novel, a mysterious stranger, played by Terence Stamp, intrudes an Italian family and seduces every member of the household before leaving as suddenly and mysterious as he came.

The shooting location of Peck's film, a three level villa, lies in the already completely rebuild neighbourhood Pacot in Port-au-Prince. The first ideas for the film came when Peck drove daily through that wealthy area while shooting the documentary Assistance Mortelle seeing that the rich were equally affected by the earthquake.

By mid-May 2014 the film was ready for editing and according to director Peck is expected to finish by September to be announced at the Toronto International Film Festival or the Venice Film Festival and released end of 2014. The film made its world premier at the 2014 Toronto International Film Festival where it is a Masters selection and was shown on 5 September 2014 at the Isabel Bader Theatre.

The film was shown in the Panorama category of the 65th Berlin International Film Festival and its European premiere was on 7 February 2015 at the CUBIX cinema at Alexanderplatz. Director Raoul Peck, producer Remi Grellety and the leading actors attended the second screening at the Zoo Palast on 10 February after a photocall and press conference at the Grand Hyatt hotel.

The international sales of the film are handled by Doc&Film.

== Plot ==
An upper middle class affluent couple in Port-au-Prince, Haïti, tries to rebuild their lives after the earthquake of 2010. They live in the ruins of their luxury home which was almost completely destroyed, in the district Pacot. The tension is even greater because their young adopted son is also missing. Shortly after the earthquake they are visited by a team of foreign experts which tell them to repair the house or it will be razed. In order to earn some money for the repair they move to the previous servants' quarters and rent out the only still-intact room to Alex a foreign aid worker of unspecified nationality. The tenant, who came with good intentions to Haiti, meets soon a beautiful and naive 17-year-old Haitian girl, Andrémise, from a modest background who lives in the neighbourhood. To the couples surprise he moves in together with this sassy and enterprising young woman, who calls herself Jennifer to attract foreign men. They forge a relationship but soon her maliciousness comes to light and someone gets killed. The once privileged and now helpless and defenseless owners are for the first time faced with the rigid contradictions of Haitian society.

== Cast ==
European premier poster at 65th Berlinale

- Joy Olasunmibo Ogunmakin as wife
- Alex Descas as husband
- Thibault Vinçon as Alex
- Lovely Kermonde Fifi as Andrémise / Jennifer
- Zinedine Soualem as Leonetti

== Production ==
=== Background ===
Peck stated that he wanted to approach the serious consequences of the disaster in another way than the usual images of slums and homeless camps. He was struck by seeing the collapsed homes of the prosperous class, the amazing visual of wealth in ruins.

Raoul Peck remarks in an interview:

Visually it was incredible, this image of wealth, totally crumbled. That story didn't interest many people, because you could do better images in the slums, in the camps, in downtown Port-au-Prince. (Visuellement, c’était incroyable, cette image de la richesse en ruines. Cette histoire n’a pas intéressé beaucoup de gens parce qu’il était possible de faire de meilleures images dans les bidonvilles, les camps et le centre-ville de Port-au-Prince.)

=== Funding ===
The film production was supported by the French TV channel Arte, the World Cinema Support (Aide aux cinémas du monde), SØRFOND (Norwegian South Film Fund), the Organisation internationale de la Francophonie and the European Union. The EU ACPCultures+ Programme awarded a grant in 2012 for the film project whose goal was described in the proposal as "to reinforce the Haitian film industry, notably in terms of their technical skills, and to reach a wider, international audience". The applicant was Peck's French production company Velvet Film partnering with Figuier Productions from Haiti and Producciones Testimonio from the Dominican Republic. The film, produced by Peck's own production company, is with less than one million dollar costs considered 'low budget' compared to international standards, although Peck paid the production team, people who worked with him already on his previous films, at a "very high level". The relative low funding also allowed Peck "to work freely without having to answer to anyone".

=== Casting ===
In early March the casting started and young Haitian women and men between 18–27 years were invited to apply to participate in trials in order to obtain one of the main roles in the film. Lovely Kermonde Fifi, a young debutant actress and poet, was the successful contender to play beside French actors Alex Descas and Thibault Vinçon and the German-Nigerian Joy Olasunmibo Ogunmakin, a singer-songwriter who performs under the name Ayọ, also appearing for the first time in a lead role.

=== Screenplay ===
According to Raoul Peck the script was written by 'three hands'. Haitian novelist and poet Lyonel Trouillot and French screenwriter Pascal Bonitzer offered to collaborate with Peck to work on the script.

=== Music and sound ===
The music for the film was composed by Alexeï Aïgui and the soundtrack was released together with other film music by the composer on a CD (MEURTRE À PACOT (2014) 18. Meurtre à Pacot (suite) (06:49)). Sound was created by Eric Boisteau and Benjamin Laurent.

=== Filming ===
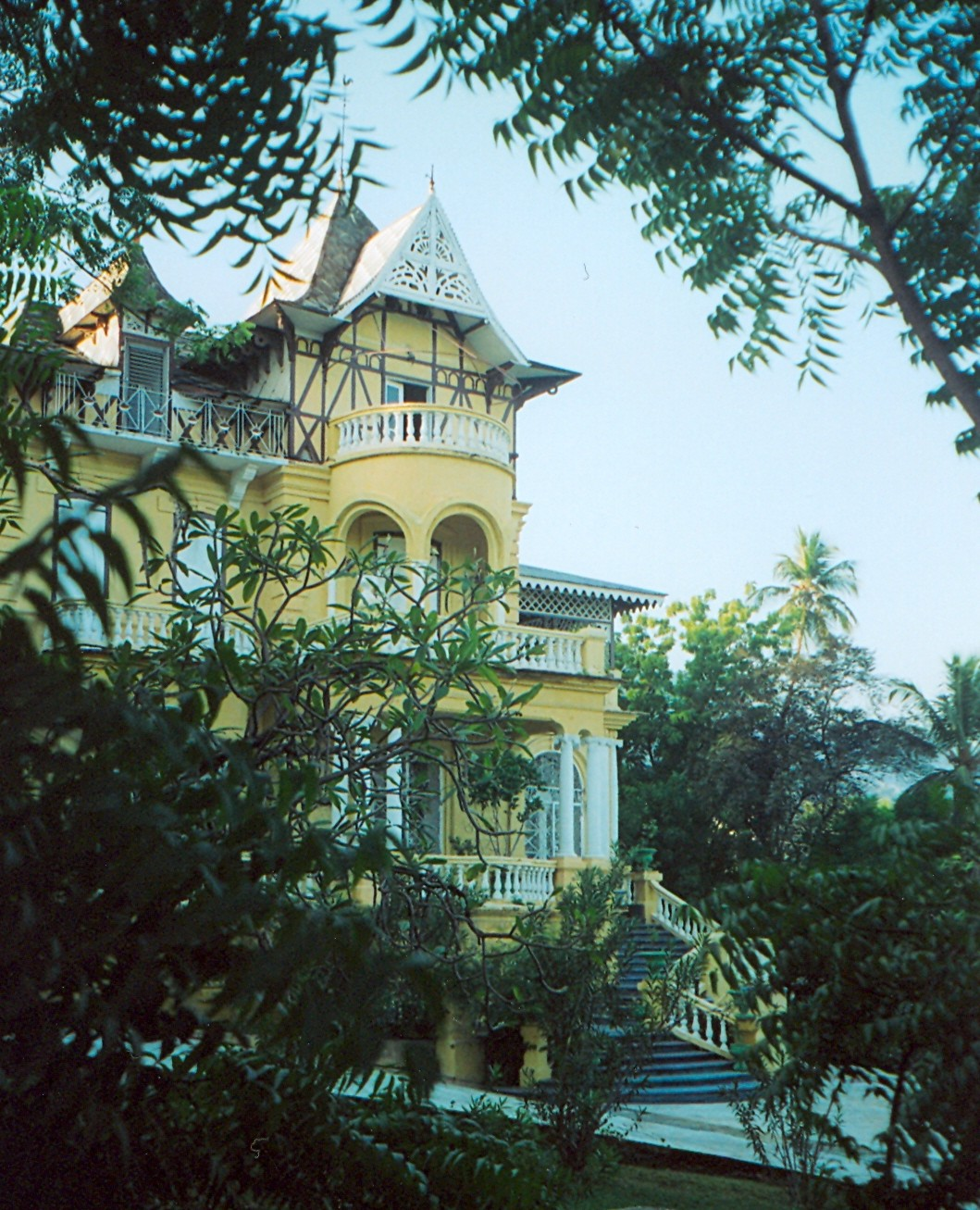
Old gingerbread villa in Pacot in 2002

The filming started on 12 April 2014 and ended 9 May 2014 although shooting was originally scheduled until 14 May, a date chosen for the official opening ceremony of the 67th Cannes Film Festival. The filming took place in Port-au-Prince. It had to be stopped for one or two days as a few team members had been affected by the ongoing outbreak of chikungunya. At times between 60 and 100 technicians, actors and extras were on scene mostly from Haiti but also from the Dominican Republic, Cuba and France.

== Awards and nominations ==
- Ricardo Alegria Price for best film in the Caribbean at the San Juan International Film Festival 2015, Puerto Rico

== DVD ==
The German DVD label 'Filmgalerie 451' from Berlin released on 3 June 2016 a double DVD with the film. The DVDs contain the following extras: on DVD 1 the press conference at the Berlinale 2015 with the director and the actors (42 minutes), the cinema trailer and a booklet, on DVD 2 the documentary 'Fatal Assistance' by Raoul Peck (100 minutes).
