= Checkerboard (film) =

1959 film

- Directed by: Claude Bernard-Aubert
- Written by: Claude Accursi; Claude Bernard-Aubert
- Produced by: Claude Accursi; Claude Bernard-Aubert; Adolphe Osso
- Starring: Grégoire Aslan; Douta Seck; Jacques Richard
- Cinematography: Jean Isnard
- Edited by: Gabriel Rongier
- Music by: André Hodeir
- Production companies: Zodiaque Productions; Lodice; Globe Films International
- Distributed by: Discifilm
- Release date: 6 May 1959
- Running time: 105 minutes
- Countries: France; Italy
- Language: French

Checkerboard (French: Les tripes au soleil) is a 1959 French-Italian drama film directed by Claude Bernard-Aubert and starring Grégoire Aslan, Douta Seck and Jacques Richard. The film's sets were designed by the art director Jean-Paul Coutan-Laboureur. It is noted for its jazz score by André Hodeir.

== Cast ==
- Grégoire Aslan as Stanley père
- Douta Seck as Vance
- Jacques Richard as Bob Stanley
- Toto Bissainthe as Bessie Vance
- Roger Blin as Slim, le guide
- Nico Pepe as Le policier
- Lucien Raimbourg as Le juge
- Doudou Babet as Le joueur de cartes
- Anne Carrère as La touriste
- Guy Tréjan as Le pasteur
- Hubert de Lapparent as Esaü, l'architecte
- Mara Berni as Virginia
- André Certes as Le médecin
- Alice Sapritch as La tenancière du Milk Bar
- Ababacar Samb-Makharam as Le jeune Noir agressé
- Milly Vitale as Daura
- Lud Germain as Le fou
- Nicole Dieudonne as La jeune femme blonde
- Moulay Sherif as Un musicien
- Sam James as Un musicien club de jazz
- Cissé Karamoko as Un musicien club de jazz
- Hassane Fall as Un musicien club de jazz
- André Muletin as Un musicien club de jazz
- Gib Grossac as Un villageois
- Pascal Fardoulis as Un jeune voyou
- Jean-Paul Dréan as Un jeune voyou
- Paul Bisciglia as Un jeune voyou
- Viviane Méry as La mère de Bob
- Bob Ingarao as Un villageois
- Theo Bipolet as Sao Sinh, l'épicier
- Jean Balthasar as Le postier
- Alain Roulleau as Le petit garçon blanc

== Bibliography ==
- Hodeir, André & Pautrot, Jean-Louis. The André Hodeir Jazz Reader. University of Michigan Press, 2006.
- Rège, Philippe. Encyclopedia of French Film Directors, Volume 1. Scarecrow Press, 2009.
