= Lumumba, la mort d'un prophète =

Lumumba, la mort du prophète
- Directed by: Raoul Peck
- Written by: Raoul Peck
- Produced by: Velvet Film, RTBF, Cinemamma, La Sept Arte
- Narrated by: Raoul Peck
- Edited by: Ailo Auguste-Judith; Raoul Peck; Eva Schlensag
- Release date: 1990
- Running time: 69 minutes
- Country: Democratic Republic of the Congo
- Language: French

Lumumba, la mort du prophète (Lumumba, the death of the prophet) is a 1990 documentary film by Haitian director Raoul Peck. It covers the death of Patrice Lumumba, the first prime minister of Zaire, now the Democratic Republic of the Congo. The film was critically acclaimed and won a number of awards. In July 2021, the film was shown in the Cannes Classics section at the 2021 Cannes Film Festival.

== Synopsis ==
The film is a creative documentary where biography and history, stories and archives create a frame around the figure of Lumumba, his political assassination, media and memory. It is a unique opportunity to examine, 30 years later, the life and legend of Lumumba. The documentary is narrated by the director, Raoul Peck, as he reconstructs a story that interweaves his own personal experiences and the circumstances surrounding the murder of Lumumba. Peck is in Belgium, and uses shots of Brussels to establish his location and contrast with the archival footage he combines to tell Lumumba's story. The film is about absence; absence of a historical figure, absence of clarity about the events surrounding his death, and absence of a true historical construct. Even a true location is absent; he cannot get to Zaire, the topic of his film, but the majority of the archival footage and photos used are from Central Africa. Even if he were able to film in Zaire, he would be faced with an absence, so no matter his location he is still "filming from afar."

== Production ==
- Director: Raoul Peck
- Production: Velvet Film
- Scenario: Raoul Peck
- Image: Philippe Ros Matthias Kälin
- Sound: Eric Martin Witz Vaucher
- Editing: Ailo Auguste-Judith Raoul Peck Eva Schlensag

== Awards ==
- Amiens International Film Festival 1991
- FESPACO (Ouagadougou) 1993
- Real Festival (Paris) 1992
- Vues d'Afrique (Montreal) 1992
- Fribourg International Film Festival 1992
