= I Am Not Your Negro =

2016 documentary by Raoul Peck

- Theatrical release poster
- Directed by: Raoul Peck
- Written by: James Baldwin; Raoul Peck
- Based on: Remember This House by James Baldwin
- Produced by: Rémi Grellety; Hébert Peck; Raoul Peck
- Narrated by: Samuel L. Jackson
- Edited by: Alexandra Strauss
- Music by: Alexei Aigui
- Production companies: Velvet Film; Artemis Productions; Close Up Films
- Distributed by: Magnolia Pictures; Amazon Studios
- Release dates: September 10, 2016 (TIFF); February 3, 2017 (United States)
- Running time: 95 minutes
- Countries: United States; France; Belgium; Switzerland
- Language: English
- Budget: $1 million
- Box office: $9.6 million

I Am Not Your Negro is a 2016 documentary film and social critique film essay directed by Raoul Peck, based on James Baldwin's unfinished manuscript Remember This House. Narrated by actor Samuel L. Jackson, the film explores the history of racism in the United States through Baldwin's recollections of civil rights movement leaders such as Medgar Evers, Malcolm X and Martin Luther King Jr., as well as his personal observations of American history. The documentary was nominated for Best Documentary Feature at the 89th Academy Awards and won the BAFTA Award for Best Documentary.

== Synopsis ==
The film opens with a 1968 interview on The Dick Cavett Show. Cavett notes that Baldwin is often asked a stubborn question: "Why aren't the Negroes optimistic?" He says that many people believe the situation to be improving considerably, with Black people now holding positions of influence across society: as mayors, professional athletes, politicians and TV actors. Cavett asks Baldwin, "Is it at once getting much better and still hopeless?"

In response, Baldwin says, "I don't think there's much hope for it, as long as people are using this peculiar language. It's not a question of what happens to the Negro here, [though] that is a very vivid question for me. The real question is what's going to happen to this country? I have to repeat that." Baldwin continues to assert throughout the film that the fate of the United States is directly linked to how effectively it addresses the plight of Black Americans. The prospects for the entire country and the prospects for Black Americans are inextricably tied together such that the truth and reckoning for one becomes the same for the other.

The film is divided into five chapters across which Baldwin weaves the assassinations of Medgar Evers, Malcolm X, and Martin Luther King Jr.

Chapter one, "Paying My Dues," portrays the school integration era of the civil rights movement, emphasizing the fierce resistance to desegregation displayed by many white Americans in an attempt to maintain the status quo of white supremacy. Peck shows both live footage of Leander Perez (supporting segregation) and photographs of 15-year-old Dorothy Counts (a student integrating a North Carolina school). Peck quotes Baldwin's writings in which he says that while others are addressing civil rights in the U.S., he is across the Atlantic. Baldwin returned to America. Baldwin asserts, "I missed the music, I missed the style… that style possessed by no other people in the world… I missed, in short, my connections, missed the life which had produced me and nourished me and paid for me."

Chapter two, "Heroes," highlights how white film protagonists are near-universally portrayed through a romantic, heroic lens when pursuing and protecting their interests, even and especially through the use of violence and rape. Peck uses clips of films and documents as examples. Baldwin's reaction to the black protagonists who do not take vengeance: "because Uncle Tom refuses to take vengeance in his own hands, he was not a hero for me." Peck shows examples of how films and other media portray Black Americans as people suspected of crimes or deviant behavior who face the barbaric consequences of those unfounded suspicions. Peck quotes Baldwin, who states that the characters portrayed by Black actors like Stepin Fetchit (Lincoln Theodore Monroe Andrew Perry), Mantan Moreland, and Willie Best "lied about the world [he] knew, and debased it."

The chapter recognizes the influential impact of the deaths of Martin Luther King Jr and Malcolm X, which caused Baldwin "to discover that the line which separates a witness from an actor" was small, but "nevertheless, the line is real."

The film shows photographs from the May 1963 meeting between Baldwin, Attorney General Robert F. Kennedy, and playwright Lorraine Hansberry (Baldwin–Kennedy meeting). The narrator describes the meeting as devolving tensely. Hansberry seeks "a moral commitment" from Kennedy in light of "the state of the civilization which produced that photograph of the white cop standing on that Negro woman's neck in Birmingham." The film reports that though the conversation does not conclude amicably, it may have contributed to Kennedy's awakening to the significance and urgency of racial issues across the country. The chapter concludes with Baldwin demanding that America "forget 'The Negro Problem'" and take responsibility for racial inequality and discrimination as an American problem."

Chapter three, "Purity," addresses differing expectations of Black actors and provides quotes from Baldwin and film clips regarding expectations for deference, racial purity, social capital, spending power, the achievement ceiling. Peck quotes Baldwin: "In spite of the fabulous myths proliferating in this country concerning the sexuality of black people, black men are still used, in the popular culture, as though they had no sexual equipment at all." Baldwin writes that, "though no one dares admit that," Harry Belafonte and Sidney Poitier were portrayed as sex symbols, as they were robbed of their sexuality autonomy as a way to appeal to white audiences." The chapter also illustrates how different audiences interpret and preserve films in racially distinct ways. In the 1958 film The Defiant Ones, Sidney Poitier plays Noah Cullen, a Black man who has an opportunity to escape by remaining on a train but chooses to jump with his white companion, John "Joker" Jackson, played by Tony Curtis. Baldwin suggests that "the white liberal people downtown were much relieved and joyful. But when black people saw him jump off the train, they yelled, 'Get back on the train, you fool!' The black man jumps off the train in order to reassure white people, to make them know that they are not hated, that though they have made human errors, they done nothing for which to be hated."

The film uses video from the 1965 debate between Baldwin and conservative commentator William F. Buckley Jr., at the University of Cambridge. In the film, Baldwin quotes ex-Attorney General Robert F. Kennedy: "It's conceivable that in 40 years in America, we might have a Negro president." Baldwin responds that Black Americans have "been here for 400 years and now he [Kennedy] tells us that maybe in 40 years, if you're good, we may let you become president."

In Chapter four, "Selling the Negro," Peck discusses the American economy of forced labor and the economy of imprisonment today. He quotes Baldwin: "the harbors and the ports and the railroads of the country, the economy, especially in the southern states, could not conceivably be what it has become if they had not had, and do not still have, indeed, and for so long, so many generations, cheap labor." In this chapter, Peck quotes Baldwin's views on whether white Americans have an accurate sense of reality, as there have "never been any genuine confrontation between these two levels of experience" of racial issues and the extent to which film and television reassures rather than criticizes.

In the concluding chapter, "I Am Not A Nigger," Peck shows photographs of African-Americans, including contemporary photos. The film's narrator reads quotes from Baldwin about whiteness as a metaphor for power and autonomy. Peck concludes with a video of Baldwin stating: "I can't be a pessimist because I'm alive, so I'm forced to be an optimist. But the future of the Negro in this country is precisely as bright or as dark as the future of the country. It is entirely up to the American people whether or not they are going to face and deal with and embrace this stranger whom they maligned so long. What white people have to do is try to find out in their own hearts why it was necessary to have a 'nigger' in the first place. Because I am not a nigger, I am a man! But if you think I'm a nigger, it means you need him. And the question the white population of this country has got to ask itself—North and South, because it's one country, and for a Negro there is no difference between the North and the South. It's just a difference in the way they castrate you, but the fact of the castration is the American fact—If I am not the nigger here, and you the white people invented him, then you've got to find out why. And the future of the country depends on that, whether or not it's able to ask that question."

Political figures, journalists, and activists who are quoted or portrayed in the documentary include James Baldwin (video of him speaking and also narrator Samuel L. Jackson reading Baldwin quotes), Harry Belafonte, Dick Cavett, Kenneth B. Clark, Dorothy Counts, H. Rap Brown, Medgar Evers, J. Edgar Hoover, Robert F. Kennedy, Martin Luther King Jr., Rodney King, Leander Perez, Sidney Poitier, David Schoenbrun, Paul Weiss, Billy Dee Williams, and Malcolm X.

The film references actors from films and television shows to make claims about portrayals of race. Visuals and mentions include Willie Best in The Monster Walks as Exodus, Joan Crawford in Dance, Fools, Dance as Bonnie Jordan, Gary Cooper in Love in the Afternoon as Frank Flanagan, Tony Curtis in The Defiant Ones as John "Joker" Jackson, Doris Day in Love Come Back, as Carol Templeton, Stepin Fetchit in I Ain't Gonna Open That Door (1947) as Richard, Mantan Moreland, Clinton Rosemond in They Won't Forget as Tump Redwine, Rod Steiger in In the Heart of the Night as Chief Bill Gillespie, and Richard Widmark in No Way Out as Ray Biddle.

== Release ==
The film premiered at the 2016 Toronto International Film Festival, where it won the Toronto International Film Festival People's Choice Award: Documentaries. Shortly after, Magnolia Pictures and Amazon Studios acquired distribution rights to the film. It was released for an Oscar-qualifying run on December 9, 2016, before re-opening on February 3, 2017.

=== Box office ===
I Am Not Your Negro grossed $7,123,919 in the United States and $1,221,379 internationally. The film industry website IndieWire attributed, in part, the financial success of the movie to the release shortly before the announcement of Academy Award nominees, opening in an unusually high number of cities, and in non-traditional movie theaters that would generate a word of mouth following.

== Critical response ==
On Rotten Tomatoes, I Am Not Your Negro has an approval rating of 99% based on 206 reviews, with an average rating of 8.90/10. The website's critical consensus reads, "I Am Not Your Negro offers an incendiary snapshot of James Baldwin's crucial observations on American race relations—and a sobering reminder of how far we've yet to go." On Metacritic, the film has a weighted average score of 95 out of 100, based on 36 critics, indicating "universal acclaim". The film received low user-generated ratings upon its release on IMDb and Metacritic, leading to accusations of vote brigading.

Joe Morgenstern from The Wall Street Journal said, "the film is unsparing as history and enthralling as biography. It's an evocation of a passionate soul in a tumultuous era, a film that uses Baldwin's spoken words, and his notes for an unfinished book, to illuminate the struggle for civil rights."

Time placed the documentary on the 100 Best Movies of the Past Decades stating that

The result is an extraordinary and multifaceted reflection on Black racial identity in America, and a work dedicated to keeping Baldwin's ideas alive in the world.

In July 2025, the film ranked number 64 on Rolling Stone's list of "The 100 Best Movies of the 21st Century."

== Awards and nominations ==
I Am Not Your Negro was nominated for numerous international awards and won over a dozen, including the following:

Award	Date of ceremony	Category	Recipients	Result
Academy Awards	February 26, 2017	Best Documentary Feature	Raoul Peck; Rémi Grellety; Hébert Peck	Nominated
Alliance of Women Film Journalists	December 21, 2016	Best Documentary	Raoul Peck	Nominated
Alliance of Women Film Journalists	December 21, 2016	Best Editing	Alexandra Strauss	Nominated
Austin Film Critics Association Awards	December 28, 2016	Best Documentary	I Am Not Your Negro	Nominated
Black Film Critics Circle	December 20, 2016	Special Mention	I Am Not Your Negro	Won
Australian Film Critics Association	March 13, 2018	Best Documentary Film (Local or International)	I Am Not Your Negro	Won
Black Reel Awards	February 16, 2017	Best Feature Documentary	Raoul Peck	Nominated
British Academy Film Awards	February 18, 2018	Best Documentary	Raoul Peck	Won
Central Ohio Film Critics Association		Best Documentary	I Am Not Your Negro	Nominated
52nd Chicago International Film Festival	October 21, 2016	Audience Choice Award – Best Documentary Feature	Raoul Peck	Won
Cinema Eye Honors Awards, US	January 11, 2017	Cinema Eye Audience Choice Prize	Raoul Peck	Nominated
Cinema Eye Honors Awards, US	January 11, 2017	Outstanding Achievement in Nonfiction Feature Filmmaking	Rémi Grellety; Hébert Peck; Raoul Peck	Nominated
Cinema Eye Honors Awards, US	January 11, 2017	Outstanding Achievement in Direction	Raoul Peck	Nominated
Cinema Eye Honors Awards, US	January 11, 2017	Outstanding Achievement in Editing	Alexandra Strauss	Nominated
Cinema Eye Honors Awards, US	January 11, 2017	Outstanding Achievement in Original Music Score	Alexei Aigui	Nominated
Dallas-Fort Worth Film Critics Association Awards	December 13, 2016	Best Documentary Film	I Am Not Your Negro	Nominated
Diversity in Media Awards	September 15, 2017	Movie of the Year Award	I Am Not Your Negro	Nominated
Florida Film Critics Circle Awards	December 21, 2016	Best Documentary Film	I Am Not Your Negro	Nominated
Gotham Awards	November 28, 2016	Audience Award	I Am Not Your Negro	Nominated
Gotham Awards	November 28, 2016	Best Documentary	I Am Not Your Negro	Nominated
Hamptons International Film Festival		Audience Award – Best Documentary	Raoul Peck	Won
Hamptons International Film Festival		Brizzolara Family Foundation Award for a Film of Conflict and Resolution – Best Film	Raoul Peck	Nominated
Independent Spirit Awards	February 27, 2016	Best Documentary Feature	I Am Not Your Negro	Nominated
IndieWire Critics Poll	December 19, 2016	Best Documentary	I Am Not Your Negro	3rd Place
IndieWire Critics Poll	December 19, 2016	Best Editing	Alexandra Strauss	9th Place
International Documentary Association		Creative Recognition Award – Best Writing	Raoul Peck; James Baldwin	Won
International Documentary Association		IDA Award for Best Feature	Rémi Grellety; Hébert Peck; Raoul Peck	Nominated
International Documentary Association		Video Source Award	Raoul Peck	Nominated
Los Angeles Film Critics Association Awards	December 4, 2016	Best Documentary Film	I Am Not Your Negro	Won
MTV Movie & TV Awards	May 7, 2017	Best Documentary	I Am Not Your Negro	Nominated
NAACP Image Awards	February 11, 2017	Outstanding Documentary – Film	I Am Not Your Negro	Nominated
National Society of Film Critics Awards	January 7, 2016	Best Non-Fiction Film	Raoul Peck	Runner-up
News and Documentary Emmy Awards	September 24, 2019	Outstanding Arts & Culture Documentary	I Am Not Your Negro	Won
News and Documentary Emmy Awards	September 24, 2019	Outstanding Documentary	I Am Not Your Negro	Nominated
North Carolina Film Critics Association	January 2, 2017	Best Documentary Film	I Am Not Your Negro	Nominated
Online Film Critics Society	January 3, 2017	Best Documentary Film	I Am Not Your Negro	Nominated
Philadelphia Film Festival	October 30, 2016	Audience Award – Best Feature	Raoul Peck	Won
Philadelphia Film Festival	October 30, 2016	Jury Prize for Best Documentary Feature	Raoul Peck	Won
San Francisco Film Critics Circle	December 11, 2016	Best Documentary Film	Raoul Peck	Won
St. Louis Film Critics Association	December 18, 2016	Best Documentary Feature	I Am Not Your Negro	Won
41st Toronto International Film Festival	September 18, 2016	People's Choice Award – Documentary	Raoul Peck	Won
Village Voice Film Poll	December 21, 2016	Best Documentary	I Am Not Your Negro	3rd Place (Tied with No Home Movie)
Washington D.C. Area Film Critics Association Awards	December 4, 2016	Best Documentary	I Am Not Your Negro	Nominated
International Film Festival and Forum on Human Rights	March 18, 2017	Gilda Vieira de Mello Award	I Am Not Your Negro	Won

== See also ==
- Black Lives Matter
- Civil rights movement in popular culture
- Hate crime
- Human rights
- If Beale Street Could Talk - both the novel and 2018 Oscar-winning adaptation directed by Barry Jenkins
- List of black films of the 2010s
- Post-civil rights era in African-American history
