= Peter Benedict =

Austrian actor, director, & writer (born 1963)

- Born: Christian Riss; 13 July 1963 (age 63); Chur, Grisons, Switzerland
- Education: Mozarteum University Salzburg; Konrad Wolf Film University of Babelsberg
- Occupations: Actor; director; writer
- Years active: 1988–present
- Parent(s): Walter Riss; Christa Rossenbach

Peter Benedict (born Christian Riss; 13 July 1963) is an Austrian actor, director and writer.

== Early life ==
Peter Benedict was born Christian Riss in Chur, Switzerland. He is the only son of actors Walter Riss and Christa Rossenbach. He grew up in Berlin, Paris and Salzburg. Benedict studied drama and film directing at Mozarteum University Salzburg and at Konrad Wolf Film University of Babelsberg.

== Career ==
Benedict began working in film and television productions under his birth name in the late 1980s. He wrote and directed the 1999 film Ende des Frühlings. In 2000, he started his film career as an actor. His first role was in Dominik Graf's drama A Map of the Heart. Since then, Benedict has appeared in numerous films and television shows, including Fay Grim (2006), Yella (2007), Lusitania: Murder on the Atlantic (2007), Unschuldig (2008), Barbara (2012), The Team (2015), and The Young Karl Marx (2017).

From 2005 to 2016, he made regular appearances in the long-running crime drama Tatort. He was part of the main cast of the crime series Kommissarin Heller (2014–2019), where he portrayed the role of Burkhard Hinnrichs. From 2017 to 2020, Benedict appeared in the Netflix science fiction series Dark as Aleksander Tiedemann. He played one of the lead roles, Robert von Bergen, in the 2018–2019 dramedy series Jenny – echt gerecht.

== Personal life ==
Benedict is married and lives in Berlin and France.

== Filmography ==
=== Film ===
Year	Title	Role	Notes
1999	Ende des Frühlings	–	Writer/director; as Christian Riss
2002	A Map of the Heart	Bernhard	
2003	Angst	Dramaturge	
2004	Agnes and His Brothers	Instructor	
2006	A Mere Formality	Chef café	
2006	Fay Grim	Raul Picard	
2007	Yella	Dr. Friedrich's lawyer Oliver	
2009	Germany 09	Prof. Ackermann	Segment: "Krankes Haus"
2010	Three	Boninger	
2011	Synkope	Mathias	Short film
2011	If Not Us, Who?	Publisher	
2011	War Horse	German officer	
2012	Offroad	Orloff	
2012	Barbara	Gerhard	
2012	The Woman Who Brushed Off Her Tears		
2012	360 x 240	Arndt Schweizer	Short film
2013	Familienbande	Father	Short film
2014	Ascension Day Ausgelöscht		
2016	A Cure for Wellness	Constable	
2017	The Young Karl Marx	Friedrich Engels Sr.	
2017	Godless Youth	Zach's lawyer	
2020	Nahschuss	Schreiber	
2021	The Day Jesus Flew to Heaven	Martin Schweiger	

=== Television ===
Year	Title	Role	Notes
2002	Dr. Sommerfeld – Neues vom Bülowbogen	Hannes Subinski	Series 5, episode 8: "Zurückbleiben, bitte!"
2002	Friends of Friends	Frank	Television film
2003	Two Days of Hope	Meinert	Television film
2003–10	Das Duo	Robert Hindelang / René Altenberg / Claas Güstrow	3 episodes
2004	Der Mustervater – Allein unter Kindern	Jan Michalczewski	Television film
2004–18	SOKO Wismar	Various characters	4 episodes
2004	SK Kölsch	Andy Fuhrmann	Series 6, episode 5: "Das Schweigen der Männer"
2004	Die Stunde der Offiziere	Hans Otfried von Linstow	Television film
2004–06	Im Namen des Gesetzes	Jens Klein / Martin Schöne	2 episodes
2005	Dr. Sommerfeld – Alte Träume, neue Liebe	Doctor	Television film
2005–16	Tatort	Various characters	12 episodes
2005	Wolffs Revier	Adrian Grosser	Series 13, episode 6: "Grenzgänger"
2005–15	Alarm für Cobra 11 – Die Autobahnpolizei	Gernod Soldan / Wulff / Frank Rickert	3 episodes
2005	Die letzte Schlacht	Red Army colonel	Television film
2005	Baby You're Mine	Klaus Schuster	Television film
2005	Kanzleramt	Hecker	5 episodes
2005	Crazy Partners	Lawyer	Television film
2005	Nachtasyl	Baron	Television film
2005	The Bodyguard	Marc Baré	Television film
2005	The Airlift	Secretary of State Acheson	Television film
2005	Unsolved	Hagen Kruse	Series 2, episode 7: "Der Duft der Angst"
2006	Eine Frage des Gewissens	Raimund Kloeppel	Television film
2006–18	SOKO Leipzig	Various characters	4 episodes
2006	Familie Dr. Kleist	Hannes Schenk	Series 2, episode 10: "Am Abgrund"
2006	Die Cleveren	Venerable director Stein	Series 6, episode 5: "Kinder (Teil 1)"
2006	Blackout – Die Erinnerung ist tödlich	Mr Seifert	2 episodes
2006	Abschnitt 40	Andreas Scheffler	Series 4, episode 8: "Schutzbehauptung"
2006	Stolberg	Edgar Holtz	Series 1, episode 4: "Du bist nicht allein"
2007–13	Polizeiruf 110	Udo Rascher / Schnitthelm / lawyer Walser	3 episodes
2007	Donna Roma	Dr. Rigolio	
2007	Dr. Psycho – Die Bösen, die Bullen, meine Frau und ich	Lemmi Lehmann	2 episodes
2007	Der fremde Gast	Policeman	Television film
2007	Lusitania: Murder on the Atlantic	Rudolf Lanz	Television film
2007	Day of Disaster	Hannah's brother-in-law	Television film
2007	Der Dicke	Stefan Siemsen	Series 2, episode 4: "Tisch und Bett"
2008	Die Anwälte	Judge Bernd Klattner	
2008	Mord mit Aussicht	Christian Lahrscheid	Series 1, episode 4: "Marienfeuer"
2008	Post Mortem	Ruger	Series 2, episode 4: "Treibgut"
2008	GSG 9 – Die Elite Einheit	Erik Brahms	2 episodes
2008	Unschuldig	Prosecutor Robert Schwenke	6 episodes
2008–15	SOKO Kitzbühel	Julius Posch / Horst Wallner	2 episodes
2008	Das Geheimnis im Wald	Reinhard Lade	Television film
2008	The Wall: The Final Days	Bertold Krieger	Television film
2008	Die Bienen – Tödliche Bedrohung	Detective Barocha	Television film
2008	Unser Mann im Süden	Vincente Morales	Series 1, episode 4: "Feuer und Flamme"
2008–10	Küstenwache	Jean-Pierre Jarron / Baudisch	2 episodes
2008	Die Heilerin 2	Dr. Thomas Fischer	Television film
2008	Wilsberg	Thomas Achtermann	Series 1, episode 25: "Das Jubiläum"
2009	Bella Block	Defence barrister	2 episodes: "Das Schweigen der Kommissarin"
2009	Die Wölfe	Vernehmer	Series 1, episode 2: "Zerbrochene Stadt"
2009–17	Notruf Hafenkante	Jost / Alex Escher	2 episodes
2009	Claudia – Das Mädchen von Kasse 1	Victor Schroth	Television film
2009	Mein Mann, seine Geliebte und ich	Manne	Television film
2009	Volcano	Prof. Dominic Merkt	Television film
2009	Die Rosenheim-Cops	Carlo Greisinger	Series 9, episode 9: "Tödliche Gier"
2009	Flemming	Florian Reissberg	Series 1, episode 1: "Glanz in deinen Augen"
2010–18	SOKO Köln	Horst Frede / Walther Fuchs / Rolf Tonndorf	3 episodes
2010	KDD – Kriminaldauerdienst	Dr. Rudolph Amler	Series 3, episode 5: "Schlaflos"
2010	Carlos	Policeman	Series 1, episode 2
2010	Tod einer Schülerin	Prosecutor Manfred Wellmann	Television film
2010	Donna Leon	Prosecutor Rizoli	Series 1, episode 16: "Lasset die Kinder zu mir kommen"
2010	Solange du schliefst	Egbert Wilke	Television film
2010	SOKO Stuttgart	Frank Kragler	Series 2, episode 8: "Sternstunden"
2010–19	SOKO Donau	Dr. Ludwig Moser / Maximilian Nordberg / Richard Kofler	3 episodes
2011	Danni Lowinski	Tim Sollmann	Series 2, episode 4: "Träume"
2011	Der letzte Bulle	Udo Bolt	Series 2, episode 10: "Ich weiß von nichts"
2011	Bloch	Peter Grohmer	Series 1, episode 20: "Inschallah"
2011	The Man from Beijing	Tom Valfriedson	Television film
2011	Stankowskis Millionen	Chief of staff Hartinger	Television film
2011	Rosa Roth	Eckert	Series 1, episode 29: "Bin ich tot?"
2012	Stubbe – Von Fall zu Fall	Lawyer Borg	Series 1, episode 44: "In dieser Nacht"
2012	In aller Freundschaft	Karsten Seidler	Series 14, episode 30: "Eine Frage der Autorität"
2012	Letzte Spur Berlin	Harald Hensing	Series 1, episode 5: "Verhängnis"
2012	A Year After Tomorrow	Lehrert	Television film
2012–16	Der Kriminalist	Michael Reiter / Andreas Schlink	2 episodes
2013–16	Ein Fall für zwei	Prosecutor Ruppert / Georg Zeitz	2 episodes
2013	Mantrailer – Spuren des Verbrechens	Holger Strattmann	Television film
2013	Du bist dran	Armin	Television film
2013	Herzensbrecher	Peter Strack	Series 1, episode 7: "Der Taufschein"
2013	Die letzte Instanz		Television film
2014	Der Lehrer	Bernd Klosterkämper	Series 2, episode 5: "Wieder so ein fieser Vollmer-Trick"
2014	Friendship on Hold	Mr Schneider	Television film
2014	Heldt	Torben König	Series 2, episode 7: "Letzte Runde"
2014–19	Kommissarin Heller	Burkhard Hinnrichs	
2014	Die Chefin	Klaus Ladewig	Series 4, episode 1: "Hinterhalt"
2014	Heiter bis tödlich: Hauptstadtrevier	Nikolaus von Erlenbach	Series 2, episode 13: "Fashion Victim"
2014	1864	Edwin Freiherr von Manteuffel	2 episodes
2014	SOKO München	Stefan Wieland	Series 40, episode 7: "Böse"
2015	Tag der Wahrheit	Götz Leppert	Television film
2015	The Team	Roland Arendt	5 episodes
2015	In aller Freundschaft – Die jungen Ärzte	Georg Kästner	Series 1, episode 6: "Nächstenliebe"
2015	Die kalte Wahrheit	Mr Dombrowski	Television film
2015	Wer Wind sät	Dirk Eisenhut	Television film
2015	Besser spät als nie	Jens	Television film
2015	Sense8	Clinic doctor	Series 1, episode 11: "Just Turn the Wheel and the Future Changes"
2016	Großstadtrevier	Enzo Capus	Series 29, episode 13: "Showdown im Revier"
2016	Ehepause	Benno Wolf	Television film
2017	Heiter bis tödlich: Morden im Norden	Tjard Theißen	Series 4, episode 8: "Tödliches Vertrauen"
2017	Romancing the Jungle	Captain Luther	Television film
2017	Ein Sommer in Prag	Jannick	Television film
2017	Lobbyistin	Otto Falk	
2017–20	Dark	Aleksander Tiedemann	
2018	Unter anderen Umständen	Thomas Reuss	Series 1, episode 14: "Das Geheimnis der Schwestern"
2018	Gladbeck		
2018–19	Jenny – echt gerecht	Robert von Bergen	
2018	The Assassination	Andreas Niedeck	
2018	Die Spezialisten – Im Namen der Opfer	Armin Wencke	Series 3, episode 4: "Der Verrat"
2019	Bettys Diagnose	Uwe Möller	Series 5, episode 21: "Liebeskummer"
2019	The Old Fox	Hannes Maier	Episode: "Schuld und Sühne"
2019	Das Quartett	Riem	
2020	Mein Tisch in der Provence – Ärztin wider Willen	Franck Gilbert	Television film
2020	Mein Tisch in der Provence – Schwestern	Franck Gilbert	Television film
2020	Kommissar Dupin	Jodoc Luzel	Episode: "Bretonisches Vermächtnis"
2020	Nord Nord Mord	Peer Wilders	Episode: "Sievers und die schlaflosen Nächte"
