= Sinking of the Lusitania: Terror at Sea =

2007 English-German made-for-TV docudrama

- Created by: Coproduction of Smithson Productions and NDR (Norddeutscher Rundfunk), commissioned by BBC1, Discovery Channel, M6 and Channel International
- Written by: Sarah Williams
- Directed by: Christopher Spencer
- Starring: John Hannah; Kenneth Cranham; Florian Panzner
- Theme music composer: Ben Bartlett
- Countries of origin: United Kingdom; Germany
- Original languages: English; German

Production
- Producer: Martin Davidson
- Editor: Colin Goudie
- Running time: 90 min

Original release
- Network: Discovery Channel
- Release: 13 May 2007
- Network: BBC One
- Release: 27 May 2007
- Network: ARD
- Release: 28 December 2008

Sinking of the Lusitania: Terror at Sea (also known as Lusitania: Murder on the Atlantic, and, in German: Der Untergang der Lusitania: Tragödie eines Luxusliners) is a British-German Made-for-TV docu-drama produced in 2007. This 90-minute film is a dramatisation of the sinking of the RMS Lusitania on 7 May 1915 by a German U-boat, U-20.

The Lusitania scenes were filmed with full-scale sections of the ship off the coast of South Africa while the U-20 scenes were filmed at Bavaria Studios in Munich using the then-newly refurbished 25-year-old U-boat set, studio model and full-size prop originally built for the 1981 West German war film Das Boot.

== Plot ==
In May 1915, the RMS Lusitania departs New York City on a transatlantic voyage to Liverpool during World War I. Among the passengers are American publisher Charles Lauriat, wealthy art collector and nationalist Sir Hugh Lane, and socialite Theodate Pope, accompanied by her companion Edwin Friend. Captain William Turner commands the liner, while warnings circulate of German submarine activity off the Irish coast. The narrative also follows the German U-boat U-20, commanded by Kapitänleutnant Walther Schwieger, as it patrols the waters near southern Ireland.

On May 7, U-20 sights the Lusitania off the coast of County Cork and fires a torpedo, which strikes the ship's starboard side. A second, more powerful explosion follows, causing rapid flooding. Panic spreads as passengers attempt to board lifeboats, many of which are improperly launched or capsize. Pope and Friend are thrown into the sea; Friend drowns while Pope survives after clinging to wreckage. Lauriat manages to escape in a lifeboat, while Lane is lost in the sinking. Captain Turner remains on the bridge until he is washed into the sea, later rescued by fishermen. Within 18 minutes, the ship founders, resulting in the deaths of nearly 1,200 people, including 128 Americans. The aftermath shows the international outrage that follows, particularly in the United States, where the sinking becomes a significant factor in the eventual decision to enter the war.

== Full cast ==
=== RMS Lusitania ===
- John Hannah as Professor Ian Holbourn survived
- Kenneth Cranham as Captain William Turner survived
- Madeleine Garrood as Avis Dolphin survived
- Graham Hopkins as Staff captain James C. Anderson, First Officer
- Kevin Otto as Alfred Vanderbilt
- Karen Haacke as Dorothy Taylor
- Frances Marek as Alice Robinson
- Aiden Lithgow as Tom Robinson
- Robyn LeAnn Scott as Margaret "Peggy" Brownlie
- André Weideman as Quartermaster Hugh Johnston, Helmsman
- Rory Acton Burnell as Robert Leith, Senior Radio Officer
- Andrew Whaley as Archibald Bryce, Chief Engineer
- Daniel Fox as Leslie N. Morton, Able-bodied Seaman

=== U-20 ===
- Florian Panzner as Kapitänleutnant Walther Schwieger, Commanding Officer
- Peter Benedict as Steuermann der Reserve Rudolf Lanz, Maritime Pilot
- Adrian Topol as Bootsmann Charles Vögele, Quartermaster
- Maik van Epple as Oberleutnant zur See Raimund Weisbach, Torpedo Officer

=== British Admiralty ===
- Michael Feast as Captain Hobbs, Director of Naval Intelligence
- Dean McCoubrey as Lieutenant Windridge, Hobbs' aide
- Martin Le Maitre as Winston Churchill, First Lord of the Admiralty

=== Other ===
- Ronald France as Lord Mersey, Wreck Commissioner of the United Kingdom
- Stephen Jennings as Sir Edward Carson, Attorney-General representing Board of Trade
- Erich Krieg as Fregattenkapitän Hermann Bauer, Commander of the German U-boat forces
- Grant Ross as British reporter
- Rosemary Ryan as Nurse at Queenstown

== Television premiere ==
The docu-drama aired on the Discovery channel in the US on 13 May 2007, on BBC One in the UK on 27 May 2007, in Germany on 28 December 2008 on ARD and on ABC1 in Australia on 11 January 2009 and the History Channel in New Zealand on 3 February 2009.

=== Ratings ===
In the United Kingdom, the film had an average of 4.53 million viewers.
