= On the Verge of a Fever =

2004 Canadian film

- On the Verge of a Fever / Le goût des jeunes filles film poster from 2004
- French: Le Goût des jeunes filles
- Directed by: John L'Ecuyer
- Written by: Dany Laferrière
- Based on: Dining with the Dictator (Le Goût des jeunes filles) by Dany Laferrière
- Produced by: Anne-Marie Gélinas; Andrew Noble; Christian Larouche
- Starring: Lansana Kourouma; Uly Darly; Koumba Ball; Néhémie Dumas; Maita Lavole; Daphnee Desravines; Mireille Métellus; Luck Mervil; Maka Kotto
- Cinematography: Jean-Pierre St-Louis
- Edited by: Aube Foglia
- Music by: Ned Bouhalassa; Luck Mervil
- Production company: Productions Jeux d'Ombres
- Distributed by: Christal Films
- Release date: September 15, 2004 (TIFF)
- Running time: 84 minutes
- Country: Canada
- Language: French

On the Verge of a Fever (French: Le Goût des jeunes filles) is a 2004 Canadian drama film, directed by John L'Écuyer.

== Plot ==
An adaptation of Dany Laferrière's novel Dining with the Dictator (Le Goût des jeunes filles), the film is set in Haiti over the weekend in 1971 when François Duvalier died and was succeeded as president of Haiti by his son Jean-Claude Duvalier.

It centres on Fanfan, a fifteen-year-old boy who is hiding from the Tonton Macoute after being drawn into trouble by his friend Gégé, and who loses his virginity to Miki, the young woman sheltering him at her home.

Fanfan is a character who frequently recurs in Laferrière's work, including the concurrent film How to Conquer America in One Night (Comment conquérir l'Amérique en une nuit), which was Laferrière's own directorial debut.

== Cast ==
- Lansana Kourouma as Fanfan
- Uly Darly as Gégé
- Koumba Ball as Miki
- Néhémie Dumas as Marie-Erna
- Maita Lavole as Pasqualine
- Daphnee Desravines as Choupette
- Mireille Métellus as Fanfan's mother
- Luck Mervil
- Maka Kotto as Papa
- Dany Laferrière as narration
- Daniela Akerblom as reporter
- Dan Bigras as photographer

== Production ==
The film, which Laferrière expected to be produced in 2002, had originally been given the working title Goût des jeunes filles douces.

Although set in Haiti, the film was shot primarily in Guadeloupe due to the political instability of Haiti at the time. L'Écuyer's budget for the film was not enough to pay for insurance to film in Port-au-Prince, so the film was largely shot in Pointe-à-Pitre. During filming, the crew encountered problems with equipment operation in the 35 °C (95 °F) weather.

== Release ==
The film premiered at the 2004 Toronto International Film Festival.

The premiere performance in the United States occurred when the film was screened at the San Francisco Black Film Festival on 8 June 2005.

When Miami Dade College screened the film in December 2006, the filmmakers were present afterward for a question and answer session.

== Reception ==
Le Devoir's review after the conclusion of the 2004 TIFF was mixed: while the review praised L’Écuyer's understanding of Haiti in the 1970s and his familiarity with Laferrière's works, it was disappointed with the acting.

La Presse rated the film three stars, saying that L’Écuyer was able to capture the moments where beauty thumbs its nose at the violence and fear of Haiti's political climate in the wake of François Duvalier's death.

While Le Droit seemed impressed by L’Écuyer's ability to show the audience the tumultuous changes in an adolescent psyche – especially given the political environment, the reviewer also expressed disappointment in the acting. They felt the delivery of lines was too practiced, stating that the film "struggled" to give the characters "dimension".

Le Canada français found the film to be an intriguing tale, giving Lansana Kourouma praise for his portrayal of Fanfan.

Variety was less pleased with the film, stating that the coming-of-age tale was predictable and not unique, as well as being more consistent with an anecdote than with a dramatic piece. They were also put off by the climaxes of the story, stating that the sexual climax was "mildly discomforting".

Film Threat had praise for every aspect of the production and the reviewer was particularly pleased with L’Écuyer's decision not to "force" events on the viewer, to allow the story to "seep" into the audience's awareness. Though they did point out there are moments where the film "sputters", they also made certain to note that the film would likely appeal to audiences around the world.

The National Post rated the film three stars, commenting that the French title is illustrative of the way that the audience is given the interaction with the female characters, saying, "[T]hat's all you get of them: a taste." The reviewer does point out that there is a dichotomy in Fanfan's "delusion" that he's being pursued by the Tonton Macoute and the sexual fantasy he lives out.

The Atlanta Constitution gave a positive review, stating that L'Écuyer brings the chaos of 1971 Haiti and Fanfan's sexual awakening "smoothly", fluctuating between tension and humor and allowing characters other than Fanfan to "address the camera".

The Los Angeles Times noted that the setting and opening of the film might lead viewers to expect something action-oriented, rather than the "more mellow path" of following Fanfan leaving his innocence behind over the course of a weekend. The reviewer commented that the story had a "certain sweetness".

== Nominations ==
It was a Black Reel Award nominee for Outstanding Independent Film at the Black Reel Awards of 2006.

The film also received Honorable Mention for the Best Feature Jury Award at the Pan African Film Festival in 2006.
