= Avis Dolphin =

Survivor of the sinking of RMS Lusitania

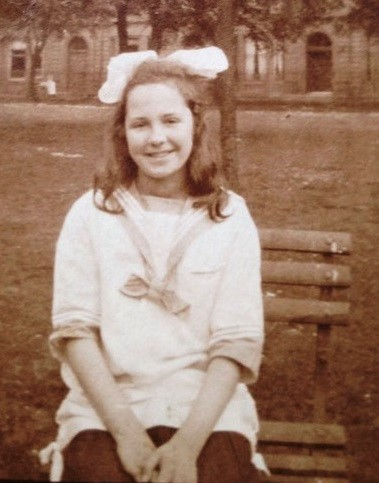
- Avis Dolphin, pictured in July 1915
- Born: Avis Gertrude Dolphin; 24 August 1902; Rotherham, South Yorkshire, England
- Died: 5 February 1996 (aged 93); Meirionydd, Wales
- Known for: Survivor of the sinking of the RMS Lusitania
- Parents: John Henry Dolphin (father); Alice Schofield (mother)

Avis Gertrude Dolphin (24 August 1902 in Rotherham, Yorkshire, England – 5 February 1996 in Meirionydd, Wales) was a survivor of the 7 May 1915 sinking of the RMS Lusitania after being torpedoed by an Imperial German Navy U-boat during the First World War.

== Biography ==
Dolphin was on RMS Lusitania on her way to England, where she was to live with her grandparents and attend school, when she befriended author and professor Ian Holbourn. She was in a second-class stateroom during the voyage. She had just eaten lunch and coffee was being served when the torpedo attack occurred. The resulting list was so sudden and violent that dishes crashed off the tables; but she recalled the scene as one of "absolute calm".

Holbourn was able to get Avis and the two nurses travelling with her into lifebelts, onto the deck, and into a lifeboat. However, the lifeboat capsized when two men attempted to jump into it. She was rescued from the ocean, but her two nurses, Sarah Smith and Hilda Ellis, were not. The bodies of Smith and Ellis were never recovered.

Following her recovery in Queenstown, she regularly visited Holbourn, who was suffering from exposure. She continued her friendship with Holbourn up until the end of his life in 1935. Dolphin even once suggested to Holbourn that books specifically written for girls were too boring. In response, Holbourn authored the bestseller The Child of the Moat, A Story for Girls, 1557 A.D. in 1916.

== Personal life ==
Dolphin was introduced to journalist Thomas Foley during a visit to Holbourn's home, and the two wed in 1926. She lived the remainder of her life in Snowdonia, Wales; dying of natural causes in Meirionydd at the age of 93 on 5 February 1996.

== In popular culture ==
For many years, Dolphin contributed her account of the sinking of Lusitania to several journalists and documentary crews. For example:

- She is a contributor to the In Search of episode "Lusitania" (16 May 1981)
- She is credited as a contributor in the National Geographic documentary Last Voyage of the Lusitania (1994), though she wasn't interviewed on camera.
- Her younger self, about age 12, is depicted in a BBC movie of the Lusitania sinking: Lusitania: Murder in the Atlantic (2007), in which she is played by Madeleine Garrood.
- Canadian author Frieda Wishinsky published a children's book, titled Avis Dolphin, in 2015, giving a fictionalized account of Dolphin's experience of the sinking.
