= Ian Holbourn =

British academic (1872–1935)

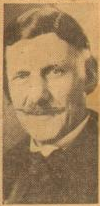
Ian Holbourn

Ian Holbourn (5 November 1872 – 14 September 1935), born John Bernard Stoughton Holbourn, was laird of Foula, a professor and lecturer for the University of Oxford, and a writer.

== Education and career ==
Holbourn was educated at the Slade School of Art and Merton College, Oxford. As a young man he became fond of the remote Scottish island of Foula, which he succeeded in purchasing around 1900, thus becoming its laird.

He was a co-founder of Ruskin College, and served on the college's correspondence and examining staff for many years. He was also appointed professor of the University of California's art and architecture extension programme, and was instrumental in the expansion of the art department of Carleton College in Minnesota, where he served part-time as a professor of art and archaeology.

== RMS Lusitania ==
Holbourn was a second-class passenger on the RMS Lusitania on her last voyage in May 1915. During the voyage, Holbourn befriended 12-year-old Avis Dolphin, who was being escorted to school and family in England by two nurses, Hilda Ellis and Sarah Smith.

With his insights into the largely hushed-up events surrounding the wreck of the RMS Oceanic on 8 September 1914 off Foula, Professor Holbourn was aware of the dangers presented to ocean liners during the First World War, and as a passenger on Lusitania was prepared to face the worst. Holbourn attempted to insist that Captain William Thomas Turner should take the precautions of ordering lifeboat drills and instructing passengers on how to wear lifejackets. His efforts to stimulate safety awareness during a time of war were unwelcome, and he was asked to keep quiet. When the ship was torpedoed by an Imperial German Navy U-boat during the First World War on 7 May 1915, Holbourn guided Avis Dolphin and her nurses to his cabin where he fitted them with life belts, even offering up his own; he then steered them through the tilting passageways to the decks above and into a lifeboat. This lifeboat capsized while being lowered into the water. Dolphin was saved, though her nurses were not.

Holbourn himself dived into the ocean to find himself surrounded by a mass of bodies and wreckage. His hope of reaching the nearest boat was interrupted when he stopped to help a man who was floating helplessly nearby. By the time Holbourn found his way to a boat, the man he had pulled along with him was dead.

Holbourn was picked up by the fishing boat Wanderer of Peel and later transferred to the Stormcock. He was one of over 750 rescued from the Lusitania to arrive at Queenstown in Ireland that night.

== Writings ==
Holbourn continued to write and remained lifelong friends with Avis Dolphin. One of his books, The Child of the Moat (1916), was written for Dolphin because she had complained that books for girls were uninteresting.

On most of his written works, Holbourn is identified as Ian Bernard Stoughton Holbourn. His published works include:

- Jacopo Robusti, Called Tintoretto. (1903). London: G. Bell.
- Children of Fancy (Poems). (1915). New York: G. Arnold Shaw.
- The Need for Art in Life. (1915). Haldeman-Julius Company.
- The Child of the Moat, A Story for Girls, 1557 A.D. (1916).
- The Isle of Foula. (Edited by Mrs Marion Constance Archer-Shepherd Stoughton Holbourn). (1938). Johnson and Greig.
- An Introduction to the Architectures of European Religions (1909).

== Personal life ==
He was married to Marion Constance Archer-Shepherd, and together they had three sons.

== In popular culture ==
Holbourn is portrayed in the docudrama Lusitania: Terror At Sea in 2007, where he is played by actor John Hannah.
