= The Man by the Shore =

1993 film

- Directed by: Raoul Peck
- Written by: Raoul Peck; André Grall
- Produced by: Pascal Verroust
- Starring: Jennifer Zubar
- Cinematography: Armand Marco
- Edited by: Jacques Comets
- Distributed by: KJM3 Entertainment Group
- Release date: 25 August 1993
- Running time: 106 minutes
- Countries: Haiti; France; Germany; Canada
- Languages: Haitian Creole; French

The Man by the Shore (French: L'Homme sur les quais) is a 1993 Haitian-French drama film directed by Raoul Peck. It was entered into the 1993 Cannes Film Festival. It was financed by Canada and France. It was released by KJM3 Entertainment Group, an independent film distribution company that also distributed with Kino International, Daughters of the Dust by Julie Dash.

The film tells the traumatizing story of Sarah (Jennifer Zubar) and her family during the tyrannical regime of François Duvalier (Papa doc).

== Cast ==
- Jennifer Zubar as Sarah
- Toto Bissainthe as Camille Desrouillere
- Patrick Rameau as Gracieux Sorel
- Jean-Michel Martial as Janvier
- Mireille Métellus as Aunt Elide
- Magaly Berdy as Mirabelle
- Johanne Degand as Jeanne
- Douveline Saint-Louis as Sabine
- François Latour as François Jansson
- Aïlo Auguste-Judith as Gisèle Jeansson
- Albert Delpy as Assad
- Michèle Marcelin as Madame Janvier
- Norah Moriceau as Annie Sarah
- Fritzner Cedon as Nazaire
- Michèle Léger as Mère Suzanne
- Anne Mejia as Mère Séverine
