= The Young Karl Marx =

2017 film by Raoul Peck

- French theatrical release poster
- French: Le jeune Karl Marx
- Directed by: Raoul Peck
- Written by: Pascal Bonitzer; Raoul Peck
- Produced by: Nicolas Blanc; Rémi Grellety; Robert Guédiguian; Raoul Peck
- Starring: August Diehl; Stefan Konarske; Vicky Krieps; Olivier Gourmet; Hannah Steele; Alexander Scheer; Hans-Uwe Bauer; Michael Brandner; Ivan Franěk; Peter Benedict; Niels Bruno Schmidt; Marie Meinzenbach
- Cinematography: Kolja Brandt
- Edited by: Frédérique Broos
- Music by: Alexei Aigui
- Production companies: Agat Films & Cie; Velvet Film; Rohfilm; Artémis Productions; France 3 Cinéma; Jouror; Südwestrundfunk; RTBF; VOO; BeTV; Shelter Prod
- Distributed by: Diaphana Films (France); Neue Visionen Filmverleih (Germany); Cinéart (Belgium)
- Release dates: 12 February 2017 (Berlinale); 2 March 2017 (Germany); 27 September 2017 (France); 1 October 2017 (Belgium)
- Running time: 118 minutes
- Countries: France; Germany; Belgium
- Languages: German; English; French
- Box office: $4.8 million

The Young Karl Marx (French: Le jeune Karl Marx; German: Der junge Karl Marx) is a 2017 historical drama film about Karl Marx, directed by Haitian filmmaker and political activist Raoul Peck, co-written by Peck and Pascal Bonitzer, and starring August Diehl. It had its world premiere at the 67th Berlin International Film Festival on 12 February 2017.

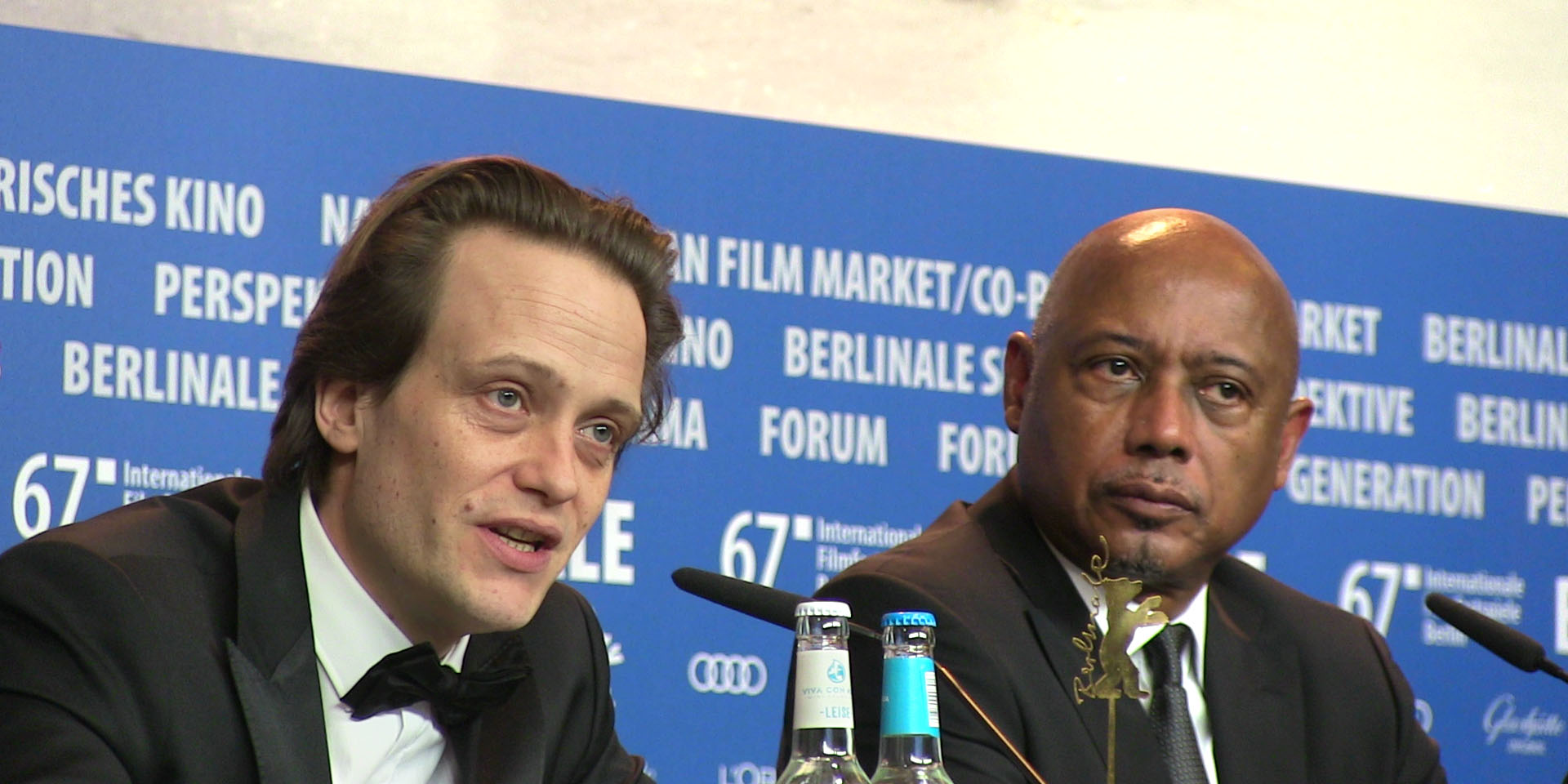
August Diehl and Raoul Peck at the 67th Berlin International Film Festival

== Plot ==
While in his 20s, Karl Marx struggles to establish himself as a writer of political and sociological importance. The film begins with a scene where poor people are gathering dead wood in a forest where they have done this for centuries, but the government has made it illegal to collect the wood as it is now legally private property of the landlords. The poor are persecuted and extrajudicially killed by the government officials. Marx wrote about these events and believes that the bourgeois class has taken ownership of the state itself.

Marx meets Friedrich Engels, a young man whose wealthy father owns factories. Engels' belief that the workers there and elsewhere, including children, are mistreated and underpaid matures. The men begin to work together to create a new political movement to reform and unite the impoverished workers. Eventually, the two stage a coup during a meeting of the League of the Just and create the Communist League in its place. The film ends with Marx and Engels publishing select theories, in a simple language for anyone to understand in a relatively short writing known as The Communist Manifesto the same year of the 1848 revolutions.

== Cast ==
- August Diehl as Karl Marx
- Stefan Konarske as Friedrich Engels
- Vicky Krieps as Jenny von Westphalen
- Olivier Gourmet as Pierre Proudhon
- Hannah Steele as Mary Burns
- Alexander Scheer as Wilhelm Weitling
- Hans-Uwe Bauer as Arnold Ruge
- Michael Brandner as Joseph Moll
- Ivan Franěk as Mikhail Bakunin
- Peter Benedict as Friedrich Engels Sr.
- Niels Bruno Schmidt as Karl Grün
- Marie Meinzenbach as Lenchen
- Eric Godon as The foreman
- Stephen Hogan as Thomas Naylor
- Rolf Kanies as Moses Hess
- Ulrich Brandhoff as Hermann Kriege
- Aran Bertetto as Paddy

== Reception ==
=== Critical reception ===
On review aggregator website Rotten Tomatoes, the film holds an approval rating of 63% based on 51 reviews, and an average rating of 6/10. The website's critical consensus reads, "The Young Karl Marx makes a valiant attempt to make the philosophical cinematic, but lacks sufficient depth to tackle its complex themes." On Metacritic, the film has a weighted average score of 62 out of 100, based on 14 critics, indicating "generally favorable reviews".

The Guardian's review by Peter Bradshaw gave the film four out of five stars and stated, "It shouldn't work, but it does, due to the intelligence of the acting and the stamina and concentration of the writing and directing." In a review for Inside Higher Ed, Scott McLemee described the film as "a nuanced and surprisingly accurate portrait of the revolutionary as a young man", noting its faithfulness to the historical record. Writing for the New Statesman, Suzanne Moore described the film as "sparky, brave and totally absorbing" and "in many ways a conventional biopic, lifted by its performances, and by its insistence that ideas matter". A.O. Scott of the New York Times regarded it as being "both intellectually serious and engagingly free-spirited."

=== Awards and nominations ===
Traverse City Film Festival

- Founders Grand Prize: 2017

=== Home media ===
The film has been released on Blu-ray and DVD in areas of Europe, though these releases are reported to lack English subtitles for extensive passages of dialogue in German or French, and are region-locked. A Region 1 DVD has been released for the North American market which includes English subtitles.

== See also ==
- Marx Reloaded
- Karl Marx in film
