= Gennadiy Aygi =

Chuvash poet, writer and translator (1934–2006)

- Геннадий Айхи; Геннадий Айги
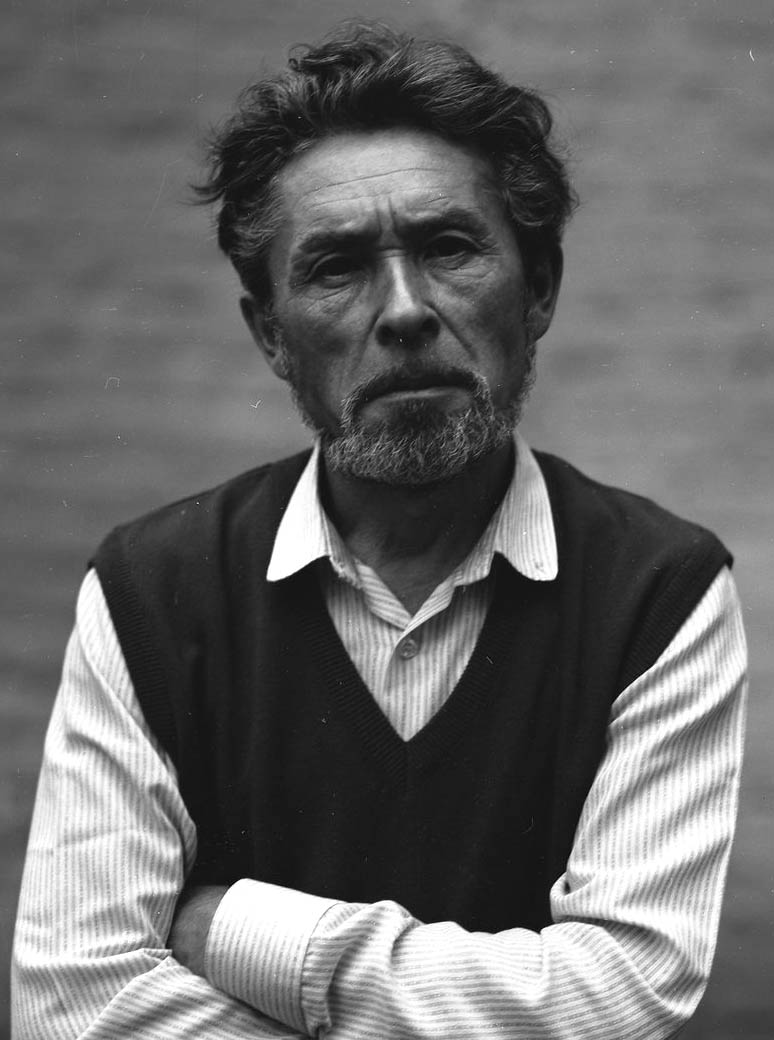
- Born: 21 August 1934; Shaimurzino, Chuvash ASSR, Russian SFSR, Soviet Union (now Chuvashia, Russia)
- Died: 21 February 2006 (aged 71); Moscow, Russia
- Writing career
- Movement: Neo-surrealism

Gennadiy Nikolayevich Aygi (Russian: Генна́дий Никола́евич Айги́, IPA: [ɡʲɪˈnadʲɪj nʲɪkɐˈlajɪvʲɪtɕ ɐjˈɡʲi], Chuvash: Геннадий Николаевич Айхи;birth name: Gennadiy Nikolayevich Lisin; 21 August 1934 – 21 February 2006) was a Russian poet and a translator. His poetry is written both in Chuvash and in Russian.

He was born in the village of Shaimurzino (Çĕnyal), Chuvashia (USSR) to a Chuvash family of a teacher. He moved to Moscow in 1953 and stayed there for the rest of his life. Aygi started writing poetry in the Chuvash language in 1958.

Among the recognitions he has won are the Andrey Bely Prize (1987), the Pasternak Prize (2000, the first to be awarded this), the Prize of the French Academy (1972), the Petrarch Prize (1993), the Golden Wreath of the Struga Poetry Evenings in 1994 and the Jan Smrek Prize (Bratislava, Slovakia).

Sofia Gubaidulina set several of his poems to music in her cycle Jetzt immer Schnee ("Now always snow").

His son Aleksey Aygi is a composer.
