= Alexei Aigui =

Russian composer and violinist (born 1971)

Alexei Aigui Алексей Геннадьевич Айги
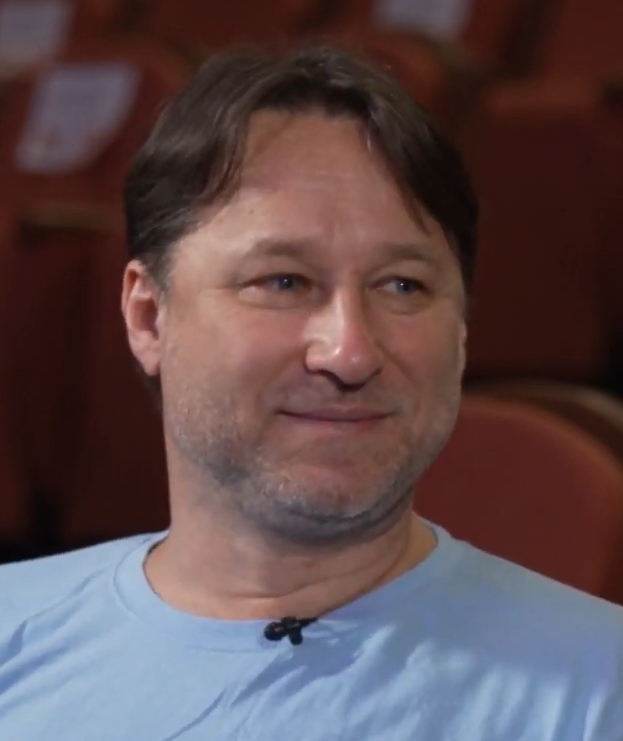
- Alexei Aygi in 2021

Background information
- Born: 11 July 1971 (age 55)
- Origin: Russia
- Genre: minimalist music
- Occupations: musician, composer
- Instrument: violin
- Years active: 1994–present
- Labels: SoLyd, Music Box, Lakeshore, Leo Records
- Member of: 4'33" Ensemble
- Website: www.facebook.com/AlexeiAiguimusic/

Aleksey Aygi (also Alexei Aigui (Russian: Алексей Геннадьевич Айги), born 11 July 1971) is a Russian composer, violinist, and leader of the 4'33" Ensemble.

== Biography and career ==
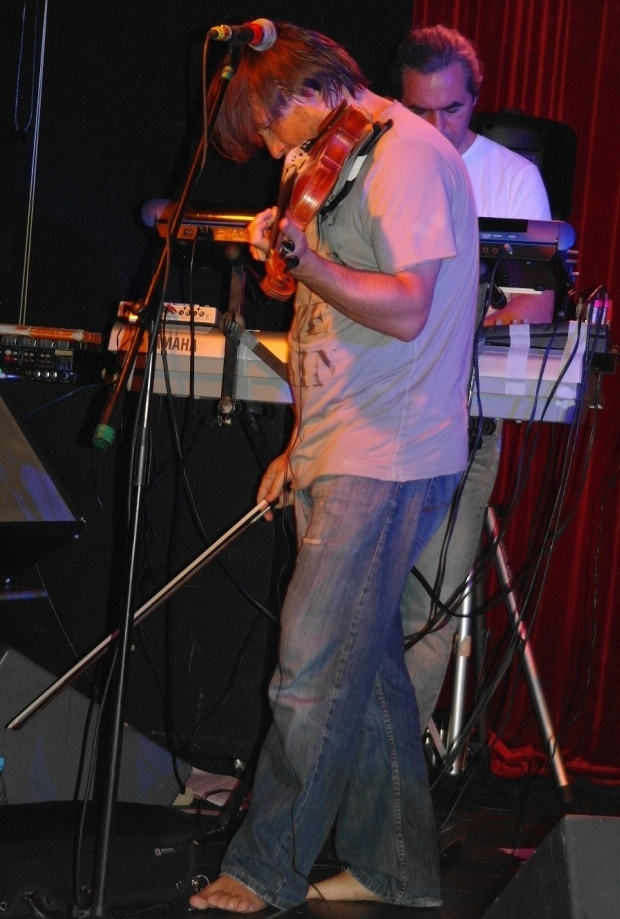
Aleksey Aygi in 2010

Aygi is ethnically Chuvash and the son of Chuvash national poet Gennadiy Aygi.

A graduate of Moscow's State Music and Pedagogical Institute, Aigi's work has been noted for its minimalist aesthetics. This investment in minimalism led Aygi to name his band after the John Cage composition 4′33″, the score for which instructs performers to refrain from playing their instruments. In 1994, Aygi debuted his 4'33" Ensemble at the Moscow International Festival of Modern Music, with another early performance taking place at the 1996 "European Days in Samara" festival.

Aygi is a prolific composer who has scored dozens of films and television programs, including Country of the Deaf, which received the Russian Guild of Film Critics Award for Best Score; Wild Field, which received a Nika Award, Golden Eagle Award, and Kinotavr Award for Best Music, as well as the White Elephant Award for Best Composer; and the widely-acclaimed I Am Not Your Negro, which was nominated for a Cinema Eye Honors Award for Outstanding Achievement in Original Music Score.

== Discography ==
=== Leader or co-leader ===
Release year	Title	Label	Notes
2001	Musique Cyrillique	SoLyd	with Pierre Bastien
2002	Aigui & Bonnen Play the Music of Jimi Hendrix: Up From The Skies	SoLyd	with Dietmar Bonnen
2003	Aigui & Bonnen Play The Music Of Frank Zappa: Black Water	SoLyd	with Dietmar Bonnen
2008	The Closer	SoLyd	solo
2009	Aigui & Bonnen Play the Music of Kurt Weill: Nightshift	SoLyd	with Dietmar Bonnen

=== with Ensemble 4'33" ===
Release year	Title	Label	Notes
1997	Sisters Grimm Tales	SoLyd Records	ft. the NeTe
1997	Falls	Long Arms Records	
1998	Hearts (Сердца)	SoLyd	
1999	Taxidermy	SoLyd	
1999	One Second Hand (Music For Kinetic Theatre)	SoLyd	
2001	Equus	SoLyd	
2002	Happiness, Fame And Fortune	SoLyd	
2003	Mix	SoLyd	ft. Mina Agossi
2005	Live @ Loft	SoLyd	
2012	Hard Disc	SoLyd	
2016	Sergey Kuryokhin: The Spirit Lives	Leo Records	

== Selected filmography ==
Release year	Film	Soundtrack Label	Awards
1998	Country of the Deaf (soundtrack: Les Silencieuses)	Sergent Major Recording	Golden Aries Award for best score; Nika Award nominee
1998	Retro vtroyom		
1998	Chastnye kroniki. Monolog		
2000	Kamenskaya: Chuzhaya maska		
2002	The Lover		Golden Aries nominee; Nika nominee
2004	My Step Brother Frankenstein		
2004	Kvartirka (TV series)		
2004	Mars		
2004	Ragin		
2005	The Fall of the Empire (TV series)		
2005	The Wedding Chest		Golden Aries nominee
2006	Charell		
2006	Mans virs Andrejs Saharovs		
2006	Made in Paris (Je pense à vous)		
2007	Sishik Poutilin (TV series)		
2008	The Great Alibi		
2008	Snezhnyy angel		
2008	Wild Field	Music Box Records	Golden Eagle, Nika, and Kinotavr Awards for Best Music; White Elephant Award for Best Composer
2008	Ochen russkiy detektiv		
2009	L'école du pouvoir		
2009	Can't Say No (Je ne dis pas non)		
2009	Moloch Tropical		
2011	Hop-o'-My-Thumb (Le petit poucet)		
2012	The Horde	SoLyd Records	
2012	Rondo		
2012	Looking for Hortense		
2014	Vychislitel		
2015	Orlean		Nika Nominee; White Elephant for Best Composer
2015	V dalyokom sorok pyatom... Vstrechi na Elbe		Nika for Best Music
2015	Krasnaya koroleva (TV series)		
2016	I Am Not Your Negro	Music Box Records / Lakeshore Records	Cinema Eye Honors Award Nominee
2016	Mata Hari (TV series)		APKiT nominee for Best Music in a TV Movie/Series
2017	The Young Karl Marx		
2017	André		
2017	Doktor Rikhter (TV series)		
2017	Our Little Secret		
2018	Assia		
2019	Good as New		
2019	The Truth (La vérité)	Music Box Records	
2022	No Crying		
2026	Maigret and the Dead Lover		
