= Moloch Tropical =

- Directed by: Raoul Peck
- Screenplay by: Jean-René Lemoine, Raoul Peck
- Produced by: Velvet Film; ARTE France
- Starring: Zinedine Soualem; Sonia Rolland; Mireille Métellus; Nicole Dogue; Gessica Généus; Jean-René Lemoine
- Cinematography: Éric Guichard
- Edited by: Martine Barraque
- Music by: Alexei Agui
- Release dates: September 12, 2009 (Toronto); September 10, 2010 (France)
- Running time: 106 minutes
- Countries: France; Haiti

Moloch Tropical is a 2009 film about a political revolution in Haiti.

== Plot ==
Amidst the protection of a fortified palace perched on the top of a mountain, a democratically elected president and his closest collaborators are getting ready for a commemorative celebration dinner. Foreign chiefs of state and dignitaries of all sorts are expected to assist. However, the morning of the event, he awakens to find the country in an uprising. As the day goes on, rebellion rampages through the most popular neighborhoods and the guests call to cancel one after another. After consulting with his collaborators, the president decides to teach the demonstrators a lesson by sending in his private militia.

== Awards ==
- 2010 Signis prize of World Catholic Association for Communication (Milano Film Festival)

=== Main film festivals selection ===
- Toronto International Film Festival 2009 - Special Presentation
- Dubai International Film Festival 2009
- Berlin International Film Festival 2010 - Berlinale Special
- Tribeca International Film Festival 2010
- Sydney International Film Festival 2010 - International competition
