= Raoul Peck =

Haitian filmmaker and activist (born 1953)

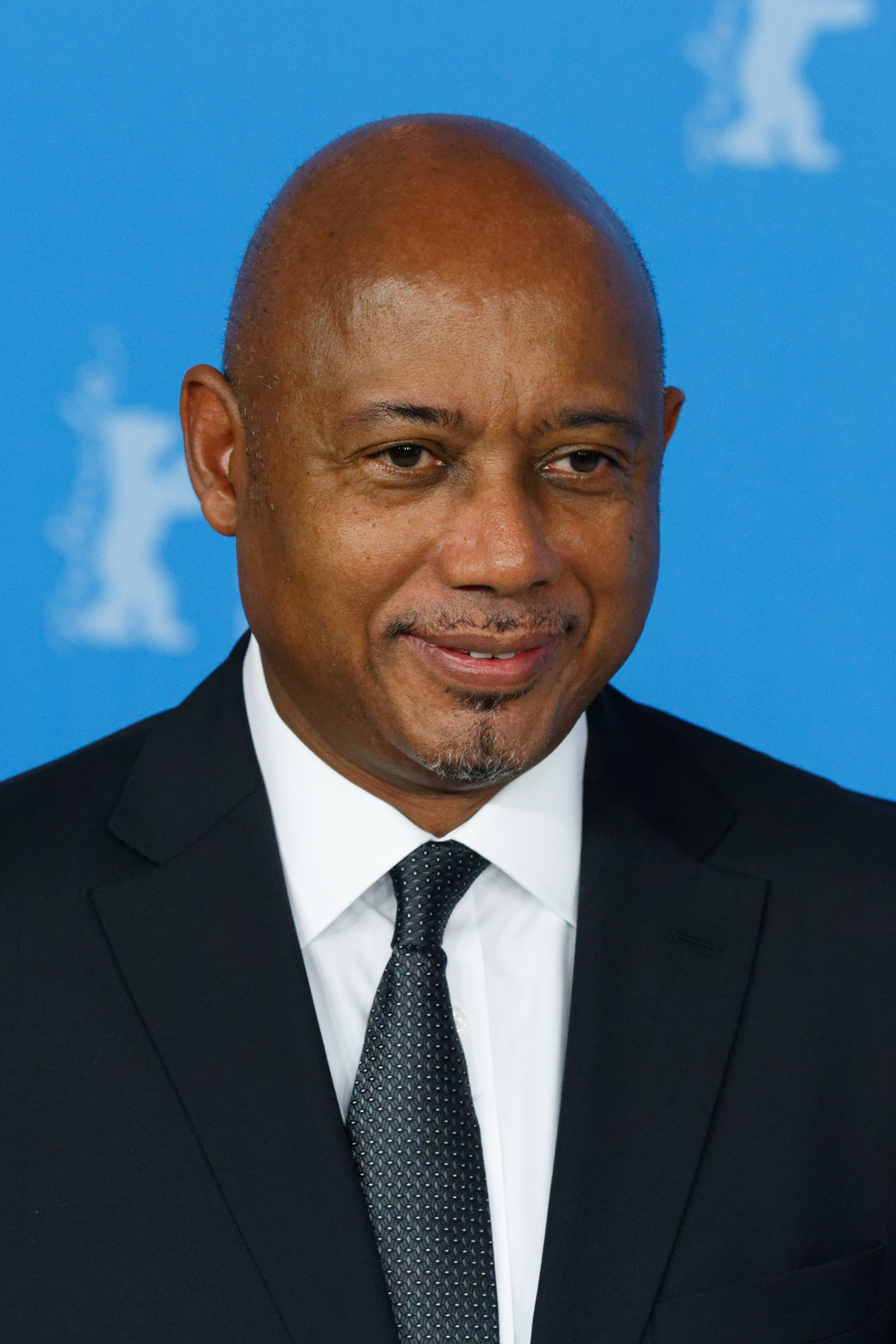
- Peck in 2017

Minister of Culture of Haiti
- In office March 1996 – October 1997
- Prime Minister: Rosny Smarth

Personal details
- Born: 9 September 1953 (age 73) Port-au-Prince, Haiti
- Education: Deutsche Film- und Fernsehakademie Berlin
- Occupation: Filmmaker

Raoul Peck (born 9 September 1953) is a Haitian filmmaker and director. He is known for using historical, political, and personal characters to tackle and recount societal issues and historical events. Peck was Haiti's Minister of Culture from 1996 to September 1997. His film I Am Not Your Negro (2016), about the life of James Baldwin and race relations in the United States, was nominated for an Oscar in January 2017 and won a César Award in France. Peck's HBO documentary miniseries, Exterminate All the Brutes (2021), received a Peabody Award.

Peck is also the founder of Velvet Film, a film production company in Paris, New York, and Port-au-Prince. He also founded "El Dorado Forum" (Port-au-Prince, Haiti) in 1995, a center that supports the creativity and enrichment of artists.

== Early life and education ==
Peck was born in Port-au-Prince, Haiti. At the age of eight, Peck and his family (he has three brothers including Hébert Peck) fled the Duvalier dictatorship and joined his father in what is now called Kinshasa the Democratic Republic of the Congo, but at the time was called Léopoldville in the Republic of Congo. His father Hebert B. Peck, an agronomist, worked for the United Nations FAO and UNESCO and had taken a job there as professor of agriculture along with many Haitian professionals invited by the government to fill positions recently vacated by Belgians departing after independence. His mother, Giselle, served as an aide and secretary to mayors of Kinshasa.

Peck attended schools in Kinshasa, DRC, in Brooklyn, New York and in Orléans, France where he earned a baccalauréat, before studying industrial engineering and economics at Berlin's Humboldt University.

Peck waited until after graduating from Humboldt University to pursue his cinematic career as dreams of becoming an artist were frowned upon in Haiti, his home country. He said, "It's what saved me. I didn't come to Europe thinking that I was going to stay. I knew that I had to educate myself as much as possible, then return to Haiti secretly if need be." Peck later spent a year as a New York City taxi driver and worked (1980–85) as a journalist and photographer before earning a film degree (1988) from the German Film and Television Academy Berlin (DFFB) in West Berlin.

== Political career ==
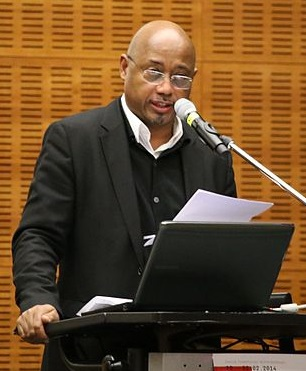
Peck in 2014 at a conference in Frankfurt

Peck served as Minister of Culture in the Haitian government under Prime Minister Rosny Smarth (1996–97), ultimately resigning his post along with the Prime Minister and five other ministers in protest of President Préval and President Aristide. Peck detailed his experiences in this position in a book, Monsieur le Ministre… jusqu'au bout de la patience. Prime Minister Smarth wrote an afterword for the book, and Russell Banks wrote the preface to the first edition. On the book's re-release in 2015, Radio Metropole Haïti reviewed it as a portrait of "a formidable democratic movement that profoundly changed the country".

== Filmmaking career ==
Peck initially developed short experimental works and socio-political documentaries, before moving on to feature films. In 1982, he directed his first short film, De Cuba traigo un cantar, which described the visit of "Carlos Puebla y Los Tradicionales," a Cuban group that played traditional Cuban music, to West Berlin and their concert for peace. In 1983 he directed Leugt, another short, about Ronald Reagan's visit to Berlin and the violent protests that arose. Also in 1983, he continued with Exzerpt, where he took on a critical and playful point of view on Grüne Woche (Green Week), the biggest dietary and agricultural fair in Germany. In 1984, he directed Merry Christmas Deutschland, a report about the history lessons of Christmas day in Helmut Kohl's 1984 Germany.

In 1986 Peck created the film production company Velvet Film in Germany, which then produced or co-produced all his documentaries, feature films and TV dramas.

While still at the German Film and Television Academy Berlin (DFFB), Peck shot his first feature film, Haitian Corner (1987), produced by his newly founded company, Velvet Film. The film portrays a Haitian man exiled in New York trying to forget being tortured by François Duvalier's secret police. When he accidentally runs into a man he recognizes as a former torturer, part of the "Tontons Macoutes," he must choose between vengeance and forgiveness.

A few years after Peck directed Haitian Corner, a producer asked him to write a screenplay about a Swiss doctor's "downward spiral" in Africa before returning to his native country as a "liberated" man. However, Peck made a counteroffer and attempted to launch a fiction project around Patrice Lumumba for the first time. This project questioned the point of view of the "black" hero, which was contrary to the usual approach where a "European" character told this genre, which investors accepted more readily (example: Steve Biko in Cry Freedom). Because of these challenges, Peck decided to produce a creative documentary instead. In 1991, this turned into Lumumba, Death of a Prophet, a film about the death of Patrice Lumumba in 1961; the 'father of Congo's independence.' Peck wanted to emphasize Lumumba's place in the continent's history.

Two years later in 1993, Peck returned to a more Haitian- specific theme with a feature, The Man by The Shore, a fictional story about the beginning of "Duvalierism" and the implementation of the process of terror through the eyes of an eight-year-old girl. The story of "Sarah, a girl who accepts her past demons and decides to live with them," got him a nomination for a Palme d’Or at the 1993 Cannes Film Festival. The Man by the Shore was the first Haitian film to be released in theatres in the United States.

One year after The Man by The Shore premiered, Peck directed the documentary Desounen, Dialogue with Death (1994). The documentary, which contains a fictitious narrator and real interviews with Haitians, focuses on the tragedies caused by the economic collapse of Haiti, and explores how different people cope.

That same year (1994), Peck wrote and directed Haiti, Silence of the Dogs, which documented the confrontation between the democratically-elected Haitian President, Jean-Bertrand Aristide (who was in exile in the U.S.) and his prime minister, Robert Malval (who stayed in Haiti trying to establish democracy and opposing the military-appointed president, Emile Jonassaint).

Raoul Peck also received the Nestor Almendros Prize of Human Rights Watch in 1994. Six years later in 2000, the same organization gave him the Irene Diamond award for his work in favor of human rights.

In 1998, Peck was commissioned by the museum curator, Catherine David, to create a video essay about documenta X, a contemporary art exhibition, in Kassel, Germany: Chère Catherine.

Later that year (1998), Peck directed It's Not About Love, commissioned by the French television channel Arte. This mystery about exile and memory centers around a woman born in Haiti and living in New York City, and was the start of his collaborations with the producer Jacques Bidou.

Peck received international attention for Lumumba, his 2000 fiction feature film about Prime Minister Patrice Lumumba and the period around the independence of the Belgian Congo in June 1960.

Raoul Peck has also made his film debut on television. In 2005, he teamed up with American TV network HBO to release his film Sometimes in April, about the Rwandan genocide. The film starred Idris Elba.

Five years later, Peck was elected Chairman of La Fémis, the French state film school, on 10 January 2010. He has since been replaced with Michel Hazanavicius.

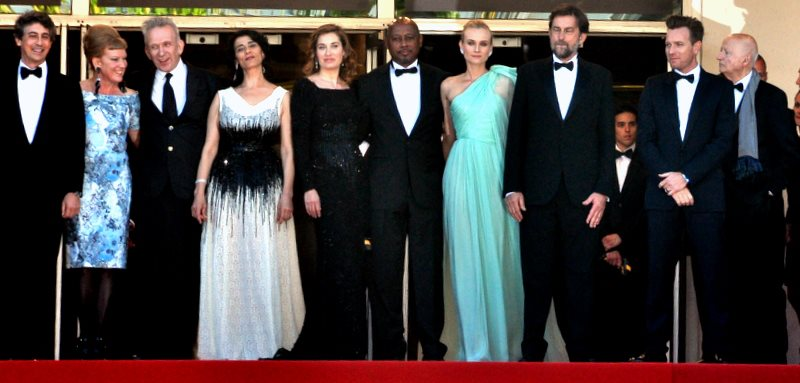
Cannes Film Festival 2012 Jury (Raoul Peck is sixth from left)

Then, a book of screenplays and images from four of Peck's major features and documentary films, called Stolen Images, was published in February 2012 by Seven Stories Press.

Peck continued his journey in the film industry when he was named as a member of the Jury for the Main Competition at the 2012 Cannes Film Festival. He won the Best Documentary prize at the Trinidad & Tobago Film Festival in 2013 for Fatal Assistance.

The Belgian segment of the shoot for his film Le Jeune Karl Marx (The Young Karl Marx) resumed in October 2015. The film is about the friendship between Karl Marx and Friedrich Engels, authors of the Communist Manifesto, during their youth.

More recently in 2021, Raoul Peck continued his partnership with HBO by directing a four part docu-series, Exterminate All the Brutes (April 2021). In this series about the genocidal aspects of European colonialism, Peck uses Sven Lindqvist's book Exterminate All the Brutes, Roxanne Dunbar-Ortiz's An Indigenous Peoples’ History of the United States, and Michel-Rolph Trouillot's Silencing the Past to expose the realities of the past and recount the "story of survival and violence." Peck himself narrates the series using both old and new footage and animation to propose white supremacy has been at the historic center of nations and has led to "exterminations" of people around the world. Peck sets a suspenseful tone to the trailer by ending with the words, "Neutrality is not an option... Over the centuries we lost all bearings because the past has a future we never expect.” The series already has a score of 82% on Rotten Tomatoes and has been described as a "fresh, current and revelatory documentary."

In 2023, Peck directed and produced Silver Dollar Road for Amazon Studios, revolving around a family's land who becomes subject to harassment by land developers.

In 2024, Peck directed and produced Ernest Cole: Lost and Found revolving around photographer Ernest Cole which had its world premiere at the 2024 Cannes Film Festival in May 2024.

Peck is currently in production on Orwell, a documentary revolving around George Orwell for Neon, and a documentary revolving around the Assassination of Jovenel Moïse.

=== La Bourse où La Vie: Profit and Nothing But! (2000) ===
In 2000, Thierry Garrel, responsible for the Arte documentaries, launched a collection of two by four parts, La Bourse et La Vie. Raoul Peck directed the first part, Profit and Nothing But! in 2001. The film takes audiences through the struggles of his native country, Haiti, as he narrates the story that portrays the burden and the toll that capitalism had on its citizens.

=== Lumumba (2000) ===
Raoul Peck decided to go back and take on the character of Patrice Lumumba with a feature film that was accessible to the public. Lumumba was released in 2000 and followed the pivotal story of Congolese leader, Patrice Lumumba. Peck used real images to unveil the "unwritten controversial history" of how Lumumba led the Republic of Congo towards its independence in 1960. This was Peck's second film on Lumumba, the first was the documentary film, Lumumba, Death of a Prophet (1990).

When asked why he chose to direct a second film on Lumumba, Peck said, "... when I started research for the feature, I was writing pages and pages and I realized that I was writing for another film. I was creating a film about discovering my own family in Congo and my own memories in Congo. And I rediscovered pictures my mother took and 8mm films my father shot. So all of this brought up a lot for me and the documentary is an expression of my personal relationship to Congo. For me the documentary and the feature film are two different stories. And when I came back to the feature film it was a very direct confrontation with the man Lumumba himself."

Lumumba received eight nominations and won three awards. It was also chosen to be in the Cannes Directors Fortnight. The film won Best Feature Film at the Acapulco Black Film Festival (2001) and the Panafrican Film and Television Festival of Ouagadougou (2001), and was the winning film in the United States’ ‘Peace’ category at the Political Film Society (2002). Lumumba has a score of 81% on Rotten Tomatoes.

=== Sometimes In April (2005) ===
This HBO English-language TV movie came out in 2005. In this war drama based on actual events, Raoul Peck describes Rwanda's 1994 massacre. A Hutu soldier (Idris Elba) fights for his family as they try to save themselves from being a part of the "almost 800,000 people" killed during the "uprising."

After the success of Lumumba in the United States, TV channel HBO, who bought and broadcast the film (the first English dubbed airing in American television), offered Raoul Peck a project that would later become Hotel Rwanda (United Artists, produced by Terry George). Raoul Peck posed a certain number of generally "unacceptable" conditions in the United States. He hesitated to make the film because of "the lack of film infrastructure." He wanted to be able to tell the story from the point of view of the Rwandan people and be able to shoot in Rwanda. Unexpectedly, Collin Collender, the President of HBO films, accepted all of his demands and the project began production.

In 2001, while in Rwanda, Peck became overwhelmed and convinced of the need to react to the Rwandan Genocide. Peck then immersed himself in the story of Rwanda and studied multiple reports, books, documents and collected various testimonies to try to understand the Rwanda of today.

Lumumba's success in Africa opened many doors for Raoul Peck, and he was able to shoot in Rwanda despite the initial difficulties (logistics, insurance, human resources). Peck said, "I felt we could make a film in which the Rwandan people can recognize themselves and participate at every level ... that it make sense to the people here first and then to the rest of the world…After many months here, we are convinced filming in Rwanda was the right thing to do…. every single line of this film, of the screenplay, is authentic and based on facts."

The Rwandan people were the first to see the film because of the moral agreement that Raoul Peck concluded with them. An American studio even allowed the world premiere of Sometimes In April in African territory. Thousands of people watched two projections on a giant screen in the Kigali arena. "I could only imagine making this film if the Rwandans were the first to see it. Whatever the critics say does not matter to me. The only people whose judgment I would accept are the Rwandan people."

In competition in Berlin, Sometimes in April, aired in the United States with huge success and was even broadcast by the national public chain, PBS, for free. This unique airing was made available to the public and followed by a panel discussion.

Sometimes in April won "TV Program of the Year" at the AFI Awards (2006) and took home the award for 'Best Film' at the Durban International Film Festival (2005) in South Africa.

=== I Am Not Your Negro (2016) ===
In 2016, Peck directed a documentary film, I Am Not Your Negro, which follows author James Baldwin, as he used his "unfinished novel, Remember This House" to highlight the history of society's poor treatment of African Americans in the United States. In the film, Samuel L. Jackson narrates the story of African American struggles and constant oppression throughout time. The book and film highlight real letters and footage of civil rights leaders like Martin Luther King Jr., Malcolm X, and Medgar Evers to put into perspective the evolution of racism in the United States. Raoul Peck took about ten years to attain the rights to the film.

The film premiered at the 2016 Toronto International Film Festival, where it won the People's Choice Award in the documentary category. Shortly after, Magnolia Pictures and Amazon Studios acquired distribution rights to the film. It was released in the U.S. for an Oscar-qualifying theatrical run on 9 December 2016, before re-opening on 3 February 2017. It received an Oscar nomination for Best Documentary Feature for the 89th Academy Awards but the award ultimately went to director Ezra Edelman for O.J.: Made in America. However, the successful film did win a César in France for Best Documentary Film in 2018. Additionally, I Am Not Your Negro won an Emmy award in the "Outstanding Arts and Culture Documentary" category in 2019.

I Am Not Your Negro received positive reviews from critics. On Rotten Tomatoes, the film has an approval rating of 99% based on 78 reviews, with an average rating of 9/10. The site's critical consensus reads, "I Am Not Your Negro offers an incendiary snapshot of James Baldwin's crucial observations on American race relations -- and a sobering reminder of how far we've yet to go." On Metacritic, the film has a score of 96 out of 100, based on 30 critics, indicating "universal acclaim".

=== The Young Karl Marx (2017) ===
The Young Karl Marx was released on 2 March 2017, in Germany. The film is about the friendship between Karl Marx and Friedrich Engels, authors of the Communist Manifesto, during their youth. While the film follows Marx and Engels, women also play a part in the story. Jenny Marx, Karl Marx's wife, assisted with the final draft of the Manifesto. At the same time, Mary Burns, Engels' partner, played the role of mediator between the two philosophers in the film.

During an interview with The Hollywood Reporter in 2017, Raoul Peck highlighted Marx's influence throughout his education while growing up; "All I am today is because of the structure that I got when I was studying the work of Marx...At that time, in the 1970s and 1980s, you needed to confront yourself with those books because it is your past, it is your present." When the interviewer asked Peck what research he used for the film, Peck mentioned that the letters between the characters in the film assisted in the creation of the film. "When you read the letters between Marx, Engels, [Marx's wife] Jenny and their friends, they're incredible. It's lively, it's funny, it's ironic. They were jokers with sharp tongues."

The Young Karl Marx took home the Founders Grand Prize for 'best script' at the Traverse City Film Fest in 2017. Furthermore, it won "Best Movie" at the 2017 International Festival of Historical Film. On Rotten Tomatoes, it has a score of 62% based on 50 reviews.

=== Orwell: 2+2=5 (2025) ===
Orwell: 2+2=5 was released in 2025 by Neon in conjunction with Jigsaw Productions. The film examines George Orwell's works, with a focus on Nineteen Eighty-Four, and uses that as a lens to look at modern day autocrats. The film was produced in collaboration with Orwell's estate.

== Style and influences ==
Since the beginning of his career, Raoul Peck's filmography reflects an ensemble of films with a particular writing style. His subjects are historical, political, and personal characters. His work considers his fragmented biography (with the intellectual and economic conflicted perspective). It also structurally exploits the effectiveness of American cinema. In this way, he uses more complex approaches like collages, time overlay of the story, flash-forward, or flashback, the recurrent use of voice-over, the author, character, and the object point of view according to the needs of the project. These multiple approaches, both formal and structurally aesthetic, allow for the organic mix of politics, history, poetry, and the personal.

=== On his writing process ===
Peck has often traveled abroad; he said that when he goes abroad he can find a sort of peace. It was hard being a black writer in America, but in other parts of the world he was way more accepted. Being away from the racism he experienced helped him to focus on his work.

Finding a writing partner (this task is difficult as is) with a biographical, philosophical, or a political profile that permits a common or complementary approach has always been a difficult process for Raoul Peck. Nonetheless, Peck found a match in screenwriter Pascal Bonitzer when writing The Young Karl Marx. He said, "The artistic challenge — and it took me ten years with Pascal to write this story — was the writing. That was the most difficult part. We were making a film about the evolution of an idea, which is impossible. To be able to have political discourse in a scene, and you can follow it, and it's not simplified, and it's historically true. This is the accomplishment."

Peck had the opportunity to renew this type of collaboration in the United States with writer Russel Banks (with two ongoing projects).

=== On his interest in social issues ===
The documentary approach is similar to that of the fiction for Peck (voice-over, a mix of politics, history, memory, poetry). For that matter, whether it be Haitian Corner, Lumumba, Sometimes in April, or L'Affaire Villemin, the uses of reality, documents, and truthful and lived details, is constant. Simultaneously, his films' political and personal factors are affected by his interest in politics and social issues. He says, "I came into the film industry because of politics, because of content—not because I wanted to make Hollywood films." Peck wants to change the way people view history; he would like to make audiences feel and cause a reaction within them. During an interview with Professor Meryem Belkaïd at Bowdoin College in Maine, Peck stated, "Especially in America, cinema is an industry that claims that its purpose is entertainment … The tendency is to please the audience, it is not so much to provoke." With this in mind, Peck's goal is to create films that are meaningful.

== Personal life ==
Peck divides his time between Voorhees Township, New Jersey, U.S.; Paris, France; and Port-à-Piment, Haiti.

== Awards and accolades ==
- Human Rights Watch's Nestor Almendros Prize (1994)
- Sony Special Prize, Locarno Festival (for Chère Catherine, 1997)
- Human Rights Watch's Lifetime Achievement Award (2001)
- Procirep Prize, Festival du Réel (for Lumumba—Death of a Prophet, 2002)
- Best Documentary, Montreal World Film Festival (for Lumumba—Death of a Prophet, 2002)
- Jury member, Berlin International Film Festival (2002)
- Human Rights Watch's Irene Diamond Lifetime Achievement Award (2003)
- Trinidad and Tobago Film Festival Best Documentary Prize for Fatal Assistance (2013)
- Oscar nomination in the Best Documentary Feature category for I Am Not Your Negro, 89th Academy Awards
- Peabody Award for Exterminate All the Brutes (2021)

== Filmography ==
=== Feature films ===
Year	English title	Original title	Notes
1987	Haitian Corner		
1993	The Man by the Shore	L’Homme sur les quais	
2000	Lumumba		Also producer
2005	Sometimes in April		Also executive producer
2009	Moloch Tropical		Also producer
2014	Murder in Pacot	Meurtre a Pacot	Also producer
2017	The Young Karl Marx	Le jeune Karl Marx / Der junge Karl Marx	Also producer and actor

=== Documentaries ===
Year	English title	Original title	Notes
1990	Lumumba: Death of a Prophet	Lumumba: La mort du prophète	Also producer and editor
1994	Desounen: Dialogue with Death	Desounen: Dialogue avec la mort	
1994	Haiti - Silence of the Dogs	Haïti - Le silence des chiens	
1997	Documenta X - Die Filme		
2001	Profit & Nothing But! Or Impolite Thoughts on the Class Struggle	Le profit et rien d’autre!	
2013	Fatal Assistance	Assistance mortelle	Also producer
2016	I Am Not Your Negro		Also producer
2023	Silver Dollar Road		Also producer
2024	Ernest Cole: Lost and Found		Also producer
2025	Orwell: 2+2=5		Also producer

=== Short films ===
Year	Title	Notes
1982	De Cuba traigo un cantar	
1983	Exzerpt	
1983	Leugt	
1984	The Minister of the Interior is On Our Side	
1984	Merry Christmas Deutschland	Also editor and cinematographer
1997	Chère Catherine	
2010	On bosse ici! On vit ici! On reste ici	

=== Television ===
Year	English title	Original title	Notes
1998	It's Not About Love (TV movie)	Corps plongés	
2006	L’Affaire Villemin (TV series, six parts)		
2008	L’école du Pouvoir (TV Movie)		
2021	Exterminate All the Brutes (TV docu-series)		Also producer

== Publications ==
- J'étouffe. (2020) Éditions Denoël. ISBN 978-2-207-16238-5 (In French)
- Monsieur le Ministre... Jusqu'au bout de la patience. (2016) Velvet Editions. ISBN 978-2-913416-00-0 (In French)
- Stolen Images: Lumumba and the Early Films of Raoul Peck. (2012) Seven Stories Press. ISBN 978-1-60980-393-3
- Peck, Raoul. (22 Feb 2018). Baldwin and Marx - Same Struggle? Talkhouse.
- Peck, Raoul. (1 Feb 2017). Journeying With James Baldwin: A Personal Note from the Director of I Am Not Your Negro. Guernica.
- Peck, Raoul. (3 July 2020). James Baldwin Was Right All Along. The Atlantic.

== See also ==
- James Baldwin
- Russel Banks
- Jacques Bidou
- Pascal Bonitzer
- Velvet Film
