= Little Ireland =

Early 19th century district in Manchester, England

Coordinates: 53°28′23″N 2°14′31″W

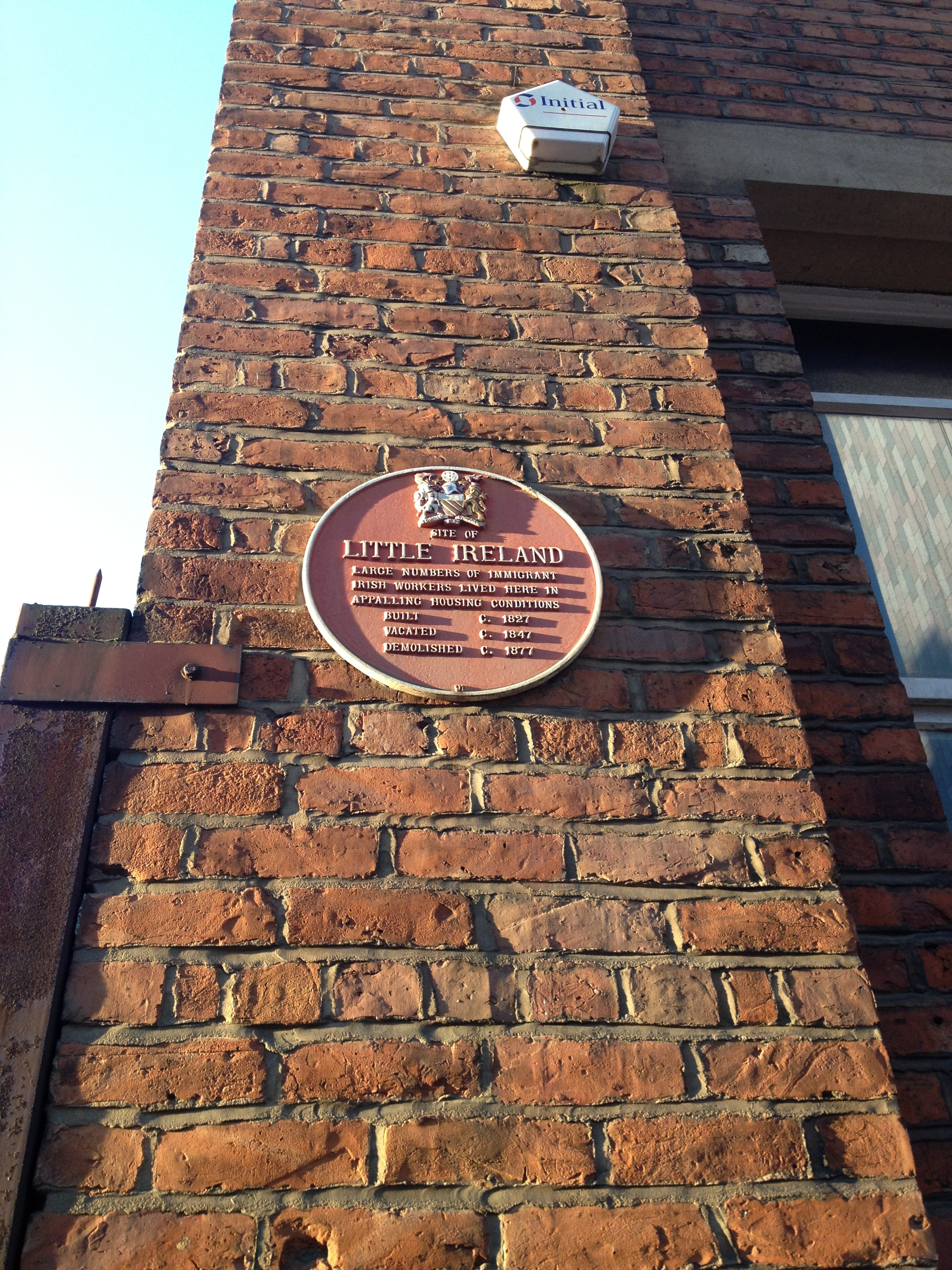
Little Ireland plaque on Great Marlborough Street, Manchester

Little Ireland was a slum district of Manchester, England in the early 19th century. It was inhabited from about 1827 to 1847 by poor Irish immigrants, and during its existence gained a reputation as the archetypal Irish district in nineteenth century industrial cities. Despite this reputation, the slum was the shortest lived of all the areas of Irish settlement in the city, and also the smallest, covering about four acres. The area existed south of Oxford Road railway station, enclosed by the railway line and the loop in the River Medlock.

== History ==
Houses along the front of Oxford Road, initially intended as modest middle-class residences, were repurposed in the early nineteenth century as multi-occupation premises for industrial workers as economic activity picked up in the city. Cellars, ordinarily used to store wood, coal and non-perishable foods, were later rented out as cheaper accommodation leading to conditions of perpetual humidity and damp in which infectious diseases could thrive.

By the second half of the 1800s, there was a considerable Irish population resident in Manchester, primarily as a result of the Great Famine which forced hundreds of thousands of people to leave Ireland. As historian Mervyn Busteed contends, "there were some Irish in every part of the city, but there was a marked tendency for them to concentrate in the poorer parts of the urban fabric, and within these areas to segregate themselves from their fellow workers".

In the 1841 census, Little Ireland had a total population of only 1,510, mostly concentrated in the small streets and courts off the main thoroughfares - James Leigh Street, William Street, Frank Street, Forge Street, and Anvil Streets were over 75% Irish in 1841. In 1845, a group of seven of these small streets were demolished in order to make way for the Manchester and Altrincham railway line and Oxford Road railway station.

The area was demolished to make way for the Manchester South Junction Railway line. In his book The Condition of the Working Class in England in 1844, Friedrich Engels wrote about Little Ireland, calling it a "horrid little slum". Aided by the popularity of Engels' book, the area gained international infamy as the archetypal Irish district in nineteenth century industrial cities.

== Commemoration ==
It is commemorated by a red plaque on 8 Great Marlborough Street, about half-way between New Wakefield Street and Hulme Street.

== See also ==
- Irish people in Great Britain
