= Mary Burns =

Irish activist and partner of Friedrich Engels (1821–1863)

- Born: 29 September 1821
- Died: 7 January 1863 (aged 41)
- Occupation: Activist
- Partner: Friedrich Engels
- Relatives: Lizzie Burns (sister)

Mary Burns (29 September 1821 – 7 January 1863) was a working-class Irish woman, best known as the lifelong partner of Friedrich Engels. Burns was born in Ireland and lived most of her life in Manchester, England.

Not much is written about Burns. The only direct references to her that have survived are a letter from Karl Marx to Engels on learning of her death, saying she was "very good natured" and "witty", and a letter from Marx's daughter, Eleanor, saying she was "very pretty, witty and an altogether charming girl, but in later years drank to excess". No images of Burns are known to exist.

== Family and background ==
Burns was the daughter of Michael Burns or Byrne, a cotton dyer from Ireland, and of Mary Conroy. The family may have lived off Deansgate.

Her younger sister Lydia (1827–1878), known as "Lizzie", lived with Mary and Engels. She continued to live with Engels after Mary's death, and married him on 11 September 1878, shortly before her own death.

They had a half-brother named Thomas, born to their father's second wife after their mother died in 1835. Their niece Mary Ellen Burns, known as "Pumps", was born in around 1860 to Thomas. Engels continued to support her after the sisters' deaths.

== Relationship with Engels ==
She met Engels during his first stay in Salford and Manchester, probably early in 1843. It is theorised, though not recorded, that Burns guided Engels through the region, showing him the worst districts of Salford and Manchester for his research for The Condition of the Working Class in England.

After meeting in the 1840s, Burns and Engels formed a relationship that lasted until Burns' sudden death at the age of 41 on 7 January 1863. Although the custom of the day was marriage, the two politically opposed the bourgeois institution of marriage and never married.

== In popular culture ==
Burns was portrayed by Hannah Steele in the 2017 film The Young Karl Marx. Frank McGuinness dramatised her and her sister's lives in the play Mary and Lizzie (1989). She was also the subject of the poem Mary, written in 1845 by Georg Weerth, who had met her in Brussels the same year.
