= Lizzie Burns =

Wife of Friedrich Engels (1827–1878)

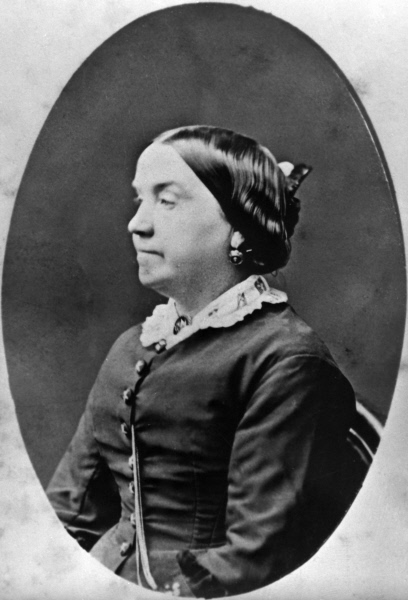
- Burns, c. 1865
- Born: Lydia Burns; 6 August 1827; Manchester, England
- Died: 12 September 1878 (aged 51); London, England
- Occupation: Activist
- Spouse: Friedrich Engels (m. 1878)
- Relatives: Mary Burns (sister)

Lydia "Lizzie" Burns (6 August 1827 – 12 September 1878) was a working-class Irish woman, the wife of German philosopher Friedrich Engels.

Lizzie Burns was a daughter of Michael Burns or Byrne, a dyer in a cotton mill, and of Mary Conroy. The family may have lived off Deansgate. Her mother died in 1835, and her father remarried a year later.

Lizzie had an elder sister, Mary (1821–1863), a lifelong partner of Engels's until her sudden death of a heart disease. Mary Burns and Engels considered marriage a bourgeois institution and never married. In the 1850s, when Mary Burns and Engels lived in Ardwick, Lizzie stayed with them as a housekeeper, and, after her sister's death, eventually became Engels's partner. In the 1870s, they lived openly as a couple in London, with Lizzie's niece, Mary Ellen (known as Pumps), as a housekeeper.

Both Lizzie and her sister were known as formally illiterate yet intelligent women, with strong working-class ties. They showed Engels the actual conditions of the factory employees in Britain. Eleanor Marx wrote that

[Lizzie] was illiterate and could not read or write but she was true, honest and in some ways as fine-souled a woman as you could meet.

Rachel Holmes notes that "Like her sister, Lizzie Burns was a dedicated player in the Irish Republican movement, and the house she shared with Engels at 86 Mornington Street was a meeting place and a safe house for Fenian activists. She was freedom-loving, uncorseted, fiercely political and sparkling with fun". Lizzie had considerable influence on the young Eleanor Marx, converting her to an enthusiastic supporter of Irish Nationalism and the Fenians (Rachel Holmes "Eleanor Marx - a life", London, 2014, p. 88.) While her father Karl Marx had some reservations about the Fenians' violent methods, Eleanor completely identified with them, regularly signing her letters to Lizzie as "Eleanor, F.S." (Fenian Sister).

In early September 1878, Burns fell seriously ill with some kind of tumour, and to please her religious beliefs, Engels married her. She died hours later. Her death made a strong impression on Engels. He later wrote about her:

My wife was a real child of the Irish proletariat and her passionate devotion to the class in which she was born was worth much more to me – and helped me more in times of stress – than all the elegance of an educated, artistic middle-class bluestocking.

Engels had Lydia buried at St Mary's Catholic Cemetery, Kensal Green and wrote on the gravestone: ″LYDIA, Wife of Frederick Engels".
