= The Condition of the Working Class in England =

1845 book by Friedrich Engels

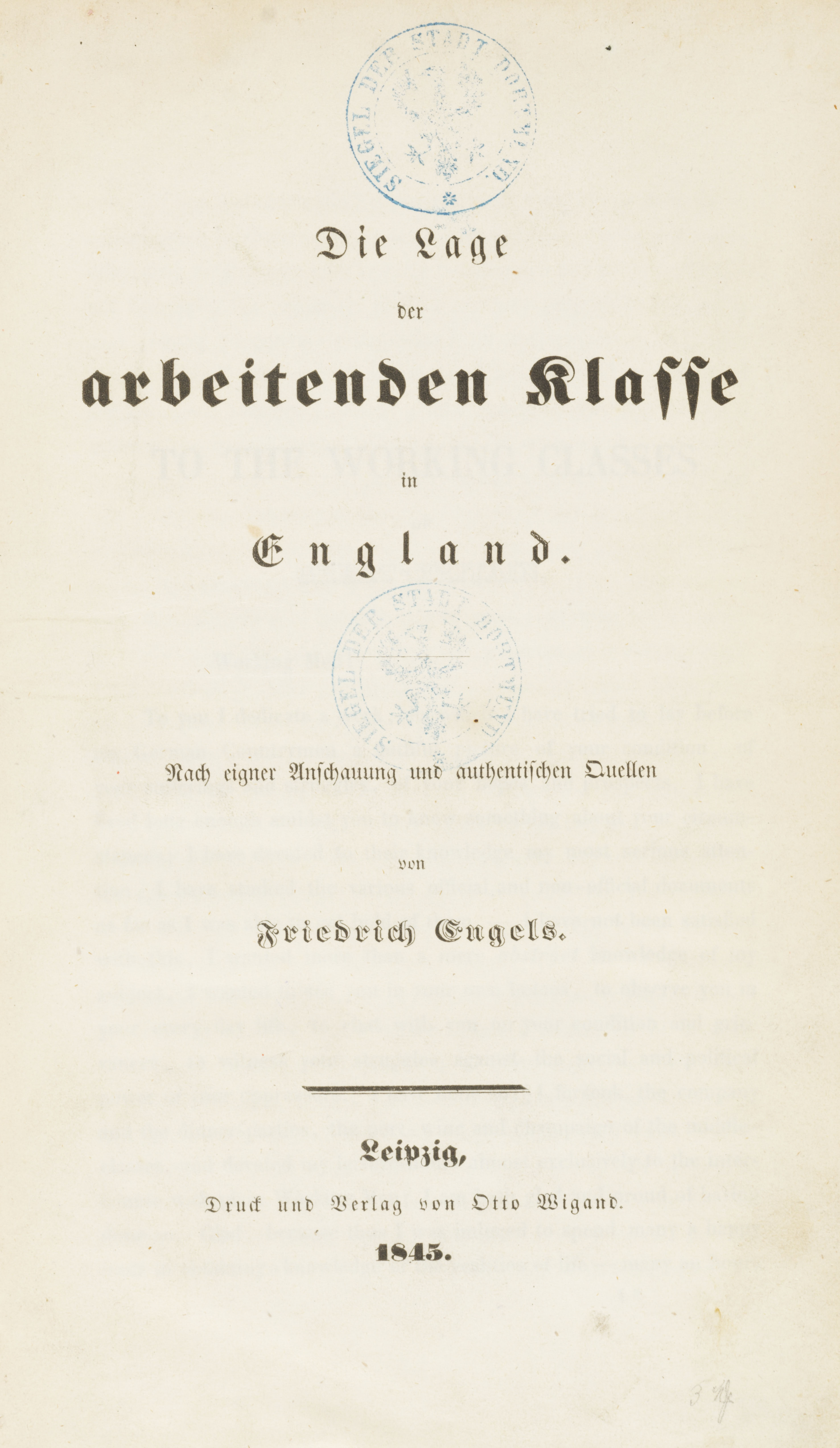
- Author: Friedrich Engels
- Original title: Die Lage der arbeitenden Klasse in England
- Translator: Mrs. F. Kelley Wischnewetzky (Florence Kelley)
- Language: German
- Genre: Politics, economics, sociology
- Publisher: Otto Wigand, Leipzig
- Publication date: 1845 in German, 1887 in English
- Publication place: Germany
- Media type: Print (book)
- ISBN: 1-4069-2036-3
- Followed by: The Communist Manifesto

The Condition of the Working Class in England (German: Die Lage der arbeitenden Klasse in England) is an 1845 book by the German philosopher Friedrich Engels, a study of the industrial working class in Victorian England. It was Engels' first book and had originally been written in German, but an English translation was published in 1887. It was written during Engels' 1842–1844 stay in Salford and Manchester, the city at the heart of the Industrial Revolution, and compiled from Engels' own observations and detailed contemporary reports.

After their second meeting in 1844, Karl Marx read and was profoundly impressed by the book.

== Summary ==
In Condition, Engels argues that the Industrial Revolution made workers worse off. He shows, for example, that in large industrial cities such as Salford, Manchester and Liverpool, mortality from disease (such as smallpox, measles, scarlet fever and whooping cough) was four times that in the surrounding countryside, and mortality from convulsions was ten times as high. The overall death rate in Manchester and Liverpool was significantly higher than the national average (1 in 32.72, 1 in 31.90 and even 1 in 29.90, compared with 1 in 45 or 46). An example highlights the increase in the overall death rates in the industrial town of Carlisle. Before the introduction of mills (1779–1787), 4,408 out of 10,000 children died before age five, while after the introduction of mills, the figure rose to 4,738. Before the introduction of mills, 1,006 out of 10,000 adults died before reaching 39 years old; after their introduction, the death rate rose to 1,261 out of 10,000.

Engels' interpretation was influential with British historians of the Industrial Revolution. He focused on both the workers' wages and their living conditions. He argued that the industrial workers had lower incomes than their pre-industrial peers and they lived in more unhealthy and unpleasant environments. This was a critique of industrialization that was echoed by many of the Marxist historians who studied the industrial revolution in the 20th century.

Originally addressed to a German audience, the book is considered by many to be a classic account of the universal condition of the industrial working class during its time. The eldest son of a successful German textile industrialist, Engels became involved in radical journalism in his youth. Sent to England, what he saw there made him even more radical.

In 1844, in Paris, Engels met and formed his lifelong intellectual partnership with Karl Marx. Engels showed Marx his book, convincing Marx that the working class could be the agent and instrument of the final revolution in history.

== The German original ==
In the original German edition he said:

The condition of the working class is the real basis and point of departure of all social movements of the present because it is the highest and most unconcealed pinnacle of the social misery existing in our day. French and German working class Communism are its direct, Fourierism and English Socialism, as well as the Communism of the German educated bourgeoisie, are its indirect products. A knowledge of proletarian conditions is absolutely necessary to be able to provide solid ground for socialist theories, on the one hand, and for judgments about their right to exist, on the other; and to put an end to all sentimental dreams and fancies pro and con. But proletarian conditions exist in their classical form, in their perfection, only in the British Empire, particularly in England proper. Besides, only in England has the necessary material been so completely collected and put on record by official enquiries as is essential for any in the least exhaustive presentation of the subject. We Germans more than anybody else stand in need of a knowledge of the facts concerning this question. And while the conditions of existence of Germany's proletariat have not assumed the classical form that they have in England, we nevertheless have, at bottom, the same social order, which sooner or later must necessarily reach the same degree of acuteness as it has already attained across the North Sea, unless the intelligence of the nation brings about in time the adoption of measures that will provide a new basis for the whole social system. The root-causes whose effect in England has been the misery and oppression of the proletariat exist also in Germany and in the long run must engender the same results.

== English editions ==
The book was translated into English in 1885 by an American, Florence Kelley, under her then-married name Florence Kelley Wischnewetzky. Authorised by Engels and with a newly written preface by him, it was published in 1887 in New York and in London in 1892. These English editions had the qualification in 1844 added to the English title.

Engels in his 1892 preface said:

The author, at that time, was young, twenty-four years of age, and his production bears the stamp of his youth with its good and its faulty features, of neither of which he feels ashamed. The state of things described in this book belongs to-day, in many respects, to the past, as far as England is concerned. Though not expressly stated in our recognised treatises, it is still a law of modern Political Economy that the larger the scale on which capitalistic production is carried on, the less can it support the petty devices of swindling and pilfering which characterise its early stages.

Again, the repeated visitations of cholera, typhus, small-pox and other epidemics have shown the British bourgeois the urgent necessity of sanitation in his towns and cities, if he wishes to save himself and family from falling victims to such diseases. Accordingly, the most crying abuses described in this book have either disappeared or have been made less conspicuous.

But while England has thus outgrown the juvenile state of capitalist exploitation described by me, other countries have only just attained it. France, Germany and especially America, are the formidable competitors who, at this moment – as foreseen by me in 1844 – are more and more breaking up England's industrial monopoly. Their manufactures are young as compared with those of England, but increasing at a far more rapid rate than the latter; and, curious enough, they have at this moment arrived at about the same phase of development as English manufacture in 1844. With regard to America, the parallel is indeed most striking. True, the external surroundings in which the working class is placed in America are very different, but the same economical laws are at work, and the results, if not identical in every respect, must still be of the same order. Hence we find in America the same struggles for a shorter working-day, for a legal limitation of the working-time, especially of women and children in factories; we find the truck-system in full blossom, and the cottage-system, in rural districts, made use of by the 'bosses' as a means of domination over the workers.

It will be hardly necessary to point out that the general theoretical standpoint of this book – philosophical, economical, political – does not exactly coincide with my standpoint of to-day. Modern international Socialism, since fully developed as a science, chiefly and almost exclusively through the efforts of Marx, did not as yet exist in 1844. My book represents one of the phases of its embryonic development; and as the human embryo, in its early stages, still reproduces the gill-arches of our fish-ancestors, so this book exhibits everywhere the traces of the descent of Modern Socialism from one of its ancestors, German philosophy.

The book has been continuously reissued, and remains in print in several different editions.
