= Barbara Bergmann =

American feminist economist

- Born: Barbara Rose Bergmann; 20 July 1927; The Bronx, New York, U.S.
- Died: 5 April 2015 (aged 87); Bethesda, Maryland, U.S.
- Spouse: Fred Bergmann

Academic background
- Education: Cornell University, Harvard University
- Influences: Gunnar Myrdal

Academic work
- Discipline: Economics, Feminist economics
- Institutions: Brandeis University; Brookings Institution; University of Maryland; American University
- Awards: 2004 Carolyn Shaw Bell Award

Barbara Rose Bergmann (20 July 1927 – 5 April 2015) was a feminist economist. Her work covers many topics from childcare and gender issues to poverty and Social Security. Bergmann was a co-founder and president of the International Association for Feminist Economics, a trustee of the Economists for Peace and Security, and Professor Emerita of Economics at the University of Maryland and American University.

== History ==
Bergmann's parents and grandparents fled anti-Semitism and immigrated to the United States from Europe in 1914. She was born in 1927 to a Romanian-born mother and Polish-born father in the Bronx. Her parents worked instead of finishing school, but they expected Barbara to adhere to the standards and traditions of American life and eventually go to college. At the age of five, she started formulating ideas about feminism, pursuing equality for men and women, because she wanted to be an independent person when she grew up, and that required money and equality. During the Great Depression, Bergmann developed a strong belief that the government should provide resources and help to individuals who faced uncontrollable circumstances or did not have the resources and knowledge to provide for themselves.

Bergmann received a scholarship to Cornell University and majored in mathematics. While in college pursuing her love for “creating models of simple processes that might or might not resemble what goes on in the actual economy,” she discovered Gunnar Myrdal’s book An American Dilemma that told of the racial inequality in the South. Myrdal's book ignited an interest in race discrimination that eventually developed into a concern for sex discrimination and followed Bergmann throughout her career.

After Bergmann graduated with a B.A. in 1948, the recession, discrimination against Jews, and workplace sex segregation made it difficult to find a job that was interesting. Bergmann took a job with the federal government in the New York Office of the Bureau of Labor Statistics where she fielded public inquiries; she was head of the inquiries unit after a year. A firsthand experience with the discrimination of a black employee at the Bureau of Labor Statistics illuminated how real and pervasive race discrimination was at the time. Harvey Purdy was the only black employee at the New York office and, when Barbara managed to get him promoted, he was demoted shortly after and the job was given to someone else.

Bergmann received her Ph.D. from Harvard University in 1959 and developed an interest in computer simulated economics, realizing that economics should be based more on observation and field research than solely theorizing. Research and experience has led Barbara Bergmann to develop theories and ideas about government policy, the implementation of observation into economics, and racial and gender equality.

=== Organizational involvement ===
During the Kennedy administration Barbara Bergmann was a senior staff member of the President's Council of Economic Advisors and she was a Senior Economic Adviser with the Agency for International Development. She also served as an advisor to the Congressional Budget Office and the Bureau of the Census.

In 1965 she joined the University of Maryland, teaching there until 1988. From 1988 until 1997 she taught economics at American University.

Bergmann was also involved in numerous national and international organizations that promote advancement and equality. She served as chair of the American Economic Association Committee on the Status of Women in Economic Professions, and president of the Eastern Economic Association, the Society for the Advancement of Socio-Economics, the American Association of University Professors (1990-1992), and the International Association for Feminist Economics (1999-2000).

=== Awards ===
Barbara Bergmann received the 2004 Carolyn Shaw Bell Award for increasing the status of women in economics and creating an understanding of how women can advance in the academic field.

== Ideas ==
Bergmann has made two main contributions to economics. First, she has argued that discrimination is a pervasive characteristic of labor markets. Second, she has argued against the traditional economic methodology of drawing conclusions from a set of unrealistic assumptions. She is known for development of the "occupational crowding" hypothesis which holds that employer discrimination leads to the crowding of black men into low-wage occupations and out of high-wage occupations.

=== Economics ===
Bergmann argues that “a lot of what is bad does come from capitalism, but that can be corrected by appropriate government regulations, and by the generous government provision of important services and safety nets. But a lot of what is good and indispensable comes from capitalism too”.

Bergmann studied microsimulation at Harvard University with computer generated simulation that provided a model with equations of macrovariables constructed on analogies of microeconomics. She believes that microsimulation provides “rigor, realism, and an ability to incorporate complexities revealed by more empirical investigations into the workings of business.” In a class with Professor Edward Chamberlin at Harvard, Bergmann discovered that economic theory, regardless of its ingenuity or prevalence in the field, can actually produce a different picture of the economy than reality. It was in a market experiment in Chamberlin's class that Bergmann started to believe that economic theory needed to be influenced by actual observation of individuals. One of her personal views of economics is “that true anecdotes may well contain more valuable information about the state of things in the world than do economists’ theories, which are by and large nothing but (possibly untrue) stories made up by economists sitting in their offices, with no factual input whatever”.

Bergmann holds that observation and empirical evidence can lead to theories that actually reflect human behavior instead of producing theories on paper that do not always work in reality. She argues that macroeconomics can fix many social problems and economic policy can be used to enhance the lives of individuals, but economists are too persuaded by political affiliation to work toward a common goal.

=== Gender equality ===
Barbara Bergmann notes that equality of the sexes was not present throughout civilization – around there is an economic and social division of labor between men and women historically. Although there has been an influx of women into the labor market and men are performing a larger amount of household labor, there is still an economic division between men and women. Bergmann views the best and most feasible option for equality to be “high commodification” where many of the household tasks and childcare predominantly performed by women are outsourced to organizations and individuals. “High commodification” would include government subsidies for childcare and availability for stipends for married couples and single mothers. Bergmann believes that an increase in commodification alone cannot bring about equality, but there also needs to be “an end to discrimination in employment, highly competitive behavior by women, and extra resources from government for families who are raising children.” Bergmann has a passion for gender equality and desires to see government provisions for equitable treatment of women in the workforce.

== Death ==
Barbara Bergmann died by suicide at her home in Bethesda, Maryland on 5 April 2015. She was a longtime member of the Hemlock Society and advocate for assisted suicide. She is survived by her son, David Martin Bergmann, and her daughter, Sarah Nellie Bergmann, as well as three grandchildren. Her husband, Fred H. Bergmann, a microbiologist at the National Institutes of Health, whom she married in 1965, died in 2011.

The International Association for Feminist Economics reported via social media that they were "saddened to learn of the recent death of Barbara Bergmann" and urged people to honor her memory by donating to the Barbara Bergmann Fellowship Fund.

== Bibliography ==
=== Books ===
- Berman (Bergmann), Barbara R.; Chinitz, Benjamin; Hoover, Edgar M. (1961). Projection of a metropolis: technical supplement to the New York Metropolitan region study. Harvard: Harvard University Press. OCLC 1647143.
- Bergmann, Barbara R.; Wilson, George W.; Hirsch, Leon V.; Klein, Martin S. (1967). The impact of highway investment on development. Washington D.C.: The Brookings Institution for the U.S. Department of Commerce, Economic Development Administration - Superintendent of Documents, U.S. Government Printing Office. OCLC 237483.
- Bergmann, Barbara R.; Kaun, David E. (1967). Structural unemployment in the United States. Washington D.C.: The Brookings Institution for the U.S. Department of Commerce, Economic Development Administration - Superintendent of Documents, U.S. Government Printing Office. OCLC 232411.
- Bergmann, Barbara R; Eliasson, Gunnar; Orcutt, Guy H (1980). Micro simulation - models, methods, and applications: proceedings of a Symposium on Micro Simulation Methods, in Stockholm, September 19-22, 1977. Stockholm: Industrial Institute for Economic and Social Research Distributor, Almqvist & Wiksell International. ISBN 9789172041141.
- Bergmann, Barbara R; Bennett, Robert L (1986). A microsimulated transactions model of the United States economy. Baltimore: Johns Hopkins University Press. ISBN 9780801828782.
- Bergmann, Barbara R (1986). The economic emergence of women. New York: Basic Books. ISBN 9780465017973. OCLC 924693274. (new ed: Bergmann, Barbara R (2005). The economic emergence of women (2nd ed.). Houndmills, Basingstoke, Hampshire New York: Palgrave Macmillan. ISBN 9780312232436.)
- Bergmann, Barbara R; Folbre, Nancy; Agarwal, Bina; Floro, Maria (1993). Women's work in the world economy. Houndmills, Basingstoke England: Macmillan in association with the International Economic Association. ISBN 9780333592946.
- Bergmann, Barbara (1996). In defense of affirmative action. New York: HarperCollins Canada / BasicBooks. ISBN 9780465098330.
- Bergmann, Barbara R (1996). Saving our children from poverty: what the United States can learn from France. New York: Russell Sage Foundation. ISBN 9780871541147.
- Bergmann, Barbara R (2000). Is social security broke?: a cartoon guide to the issues. Illustrated by Jim Bush. Ann Arbor: University of Michigan Press. ISBN 9780472067435.
- Bergmann, Barbara R; Helburn, Suzanne W (2003). America's child care problem: the way out. New York: Palgrave Macmillan. ISBN 9781403962119.

=== Book chapters ===
- Bergmann, Barbara R. (1985), "The economic case for comparable worth", in Hartmann, Heidi I. (ed.), Comparable worth: new directions for research, Washington, D.C.: National Academy Press, ISBN 9780585142845.
- Bergmann, Barbara R. (1995), "Occupational segregation, wages and profits when employers discriminate by race or sex", in Humphries, Jane (ed.), Gender and economics, Aldershot, England Brookfield, Vermont: USA Edward Elgar, pp. 309–316, ISBN 9781852788438.
- Bergmann, Barbara R. (2006), "A Swedish-style welfare state or basic income: Which should have priority?", in Ackerman, Bruce; Alstott, Anne; Van Parijs, Philippe (eds.), Redesigning distribution: basic income and stakeholder grants as alternative cornerstones for a more egalitarian capitalism, London New York: Verso, ISBN 9781844675173.
- Bergmann, Barbara R. (2005), "Gender in public expenditure reviews", in Shah, Anwar (ed.), Public expenditure analysis, Washington, D.C.: World Bank, ISBN 9780821361443.
- Bergmann, Barbara R. (2007), "Discrimination through the economist's eye", in Crosby, Faye; Stockdale, Margaret S.; Ropp, S. Ann (eds.), Sex discrimination in the workplace: multidisciplinary perspectives, Malden, Massachusetts: Blackwell Publishing, pp. 213–234, ISBN 9781405134507.
- Bergmann, Barbara R. (2009), "Long leaves, child well-being, and gender equality", in Gornick, Janet C.; Meyers, Marcia (eds.), Gender equality: transforming family divisions of labor, London New York: Verso, ISBN 9781844673254.

== See also ==
- Economics education
- Economic simulation
- Feminist economics
- International Association for Feminist Economics
- List of feminist economists
- Labor economics
- Welfare economics

Non-profit organisation positions
Preceded by Myra Strober	President of the International Association for Feminist Economics; 1999–2000	Succeeded by Rhonda Sharp
