= Paula England =

American sociologist (born 1949)

- Born: December 4, 1949 (age 76)
- Education: Whitman College (BA, 1971); University of Chicago (MA, 1972; PhD in Sociology, 1975)
- Known for: Gender inequality in the labour market
- Awards: American Sociological Association for Distinguished Career in Gender Scholarship
- Scientific career
- Fields: Sociology
- Doctoral advisor: Edward Laumann; David McFarland; James A. Davis

Paula S. England (born 4 December 1949), is an American sociologist and Dean of Social Science at New York University Abu Dhabi. Her research has focused on gender inequality in the labor market, the family, and sexuality. She has also studied class differences in contraception and nonmarital births.

== Education ==
England got a BA in Sociology and Psychology from Whitman College in the year 1971, an MA in Social Sciences from the University of Chicago in 1972, and a PhD in 1975, also from the University of Chicago.

== Work ==
England has served as a professor at the University of Texas-Dallas, University of Arizona, University of Pennsylvania, Northwestern University, Stanford University, New York University, and New York University Abu Dhabi. She served as president of the American Sociological Association from August 2014 to August 2015.

England's research showed that both men and women earn less if they work in a predominantly female occupation, even after adjusting for differences between occupations in the skill and education they require. She called this a type of sex discrimination distinct from lack of equal pay for equal work in the same job, and distinct from the hiring discrimination against women trying to enter jobs. She argued that employers—consciously or unconsciously—take the sex composition of jobs into account when they set pay levels, acting as if jobs done by women can't be worth much. She argued that this bias reflects a general cultural devaluation of women and roles associated with women, and that institutional inertia cements this bias into wage structures. She also showed that when occupations feminize, their pay goes down.

England has also studied how gender norms structure the college hookup culture, which features nonrelational sex.

== Awards ==
In 1999 the American Sociological Association recognized her with the Jessie Bernard Award for Distinguished Scholarship on Gender. In 2010 the American Sociological Association's Section on Sociology of the Family recognized her with a Distinguished Career Award. In 2009 she was elected the Frances Perkins Fellow by the American Academy of Political and Social Science. In 2015 the Population Association of America awarded her the Harriet Presser award for research on gender and demography. In 2018 she was elected to the National Academy of Sciences.

== Selected bibliography ==
=== Books ===
- England, Paula; Farkas, George (1986). Households, Employment, and Gender: A Social, Economic, and Demographic view. New York: Aldine Publishing Co. ISBN 978-0-202-30323-9.
- England, Paula (1992). Comparable Worth: Theories and Evidence. New York: Aldine de Gruyter. ISBN 978-0-202-30349-9.

=== Chapters in books ===
- England, Paula (1993). "The separative self: androcentric bias in neoclassical assumptions". In Nelson, Julie A.; Ferber, Marianne (eds.). Beyond economic man feminist theory and economics. Chicago: University of Chicago Press. pp. 37–53. ISBN 978-0-226-24208-8.
- England, Paula (1995). "A feminist critique of rational-choice theories: implications for sociology". In Humphries, Jane (ed.). Gender and economics. Aldershot, England Brookfield, Vermont, USA: Edward Elgar. pp. 42–58. ISBN 978-1-85278-843-8.
- England, Paula (1995). "The failure of human capital theory to explain occupational sex segregation". In Humphries, Jane (ed.). Gender and economics. Aldershot, England Brookfield, Vermont, USA: Edward Elgar. pp. 361–384. ISBN 978-1-85278-843-8.
- England, Paula; Budig, Michelle J. (1998). "Gary Becker on the family: his genius, impact, and blind spots". In Clawson, Dan (ed.). Required reading: sociology's most influential books. Amherst, Massachusetts: University of Massachusetts Press. pp. 99–111. ISBN 978-1-55849-153-3.
- England, Paula (2003). "Separative and soluble selves: dichotomous thinking in economics". In Nelson, Julie A.; Ferber, Marianne (eds.). Feminist economics today: beyond economic man. Chicago: University of Chicago Press. pp. 33–59. ISBN 978-0-226-24207-1.
- England, Paula (2006). "Toward gender equality: progress and bottlenecks". In Blau, Francine D.; Brinton, Mary C.; Grusky, David B. (eds.). The declining significance of gender?. New York: Russell Sage Foundation. pp. 245–264. ISBN 978-0-87154-370-7.

=== Articles ===
- England, Paula (Summer 1982). "The failure of human capital theory to explain occupational sex segregation". Journal of Human Resources. 17 (3): 358–370. doi:10.2307/145585. JSTOR 145585.
- England, Paula (March 1984). "Wage appreciation and depreciation: a test of neoclassical economic explanations of occupational sex segregation". Social Forces. 62 (3): 726–749. doi:10.1093/sf/62.3.726.
- England, Paula (Summer 1985). "Occupational segregation: rejoinder to Polachek". Journal of Human Resources. 20 (3): 441–443. doi:10.2307/145893. JSTOR 145893.
- England, Paula; Farkas, George; Kilbourne, Barbara; Dou, Thomas (August 1988). "Explaining occupational sex segregation and wages: findings from a model with fixed effects". American Sociological Review. 53 (4): 544–558. doi:10.2307/2095848. JSTOR 2095848.
- England, Paula (March 1989). "A feminist critique of rational-choice theories: implications for sociology". The American Sociologist. 20 (1): 14–28. doi:10.1007/BF02697784. JSTOR 27698446. S2CID 143743641.
- Kilbourne, Barbara; England, Paula; Farkas, George; Beron, Kurt; Weir, Dorothea (November 1994). "Return to skills, compensating differentials, and gender bias: effects of occupational characteristics on the wages of white women and men". American Journal of Sociology. 100 (3): 689–719. doi:10.1086/230578. S2CID 145799264.
- England, Paula; Reid, Lori L.; Kilbourne, Barbara Stanek (November 1996). "The effect of the sex composition of jobs on starting wages in an organization: findings from the NLSY". Demography. 33 (4): 511–521. doi:10.2307/2061784. JSTOR 2061784. PMID 8939422. S2CID 24596884.
- Budig, Michelle J.; England, Paula (April 2001). "The wage penalty for motherhood". American Sociological Review. 66 (2): 204–225. CiteSeerX 10.1.1.512.8060. doi:10.2307/2657415. JSTOR 2657415. S2CID 15060907. Also presented at the 1999 AEA.
- England, Paula; Budig, Michelle; Folbre, Nancy (November 2002). "Wages of virtue: the relative pay of care work". Social Problems. 49 (4): 455–473. CiteSeerX 10.1.1.6.6226. doi:10.1525/sp.2002.49.4.455.
- Bittman, Michael; England, Paula; Sayer, Liana; Folbre, Nancy; Matheson, George (July 2003). "When does gender trump money?: Bargaining and time in household work". American Journal of Sociology. 109 (1): 186–214. doi:10.1086/378341. S2CID 143271334.
- England, Paula (August 2005). "Emerging theories of care work". Annual Review of Sociology. 31: 381–399. doi:10.1146/annurev.soc.31.041304.122317.
- Levanon, Asaf; England, Paula; Allison, Paul (December 2009). "Occupational feminization and pay: assessing casual dynamics using 1950–2000 census data". Social Forces. 88 (2): 865–892. doi:10.1353/sof.0.0264. S2CID 154788436.
- Musick, Kelly; England, Paula; Edgington, Sarah; Kangas, Nicole (December 2009). "Education differences in intended and unintended fertility". Social Forces. 88 (2): 543–572. doi:10.1353/sof.0.0278. PMC 3578704. PMID 23436948.
- Armstrong, Elizabeth A.; Hamilton, Laura; England, Paula (August 2010). "Is hooking up bad for young women?". Contexts. 9 (3): 22–27. doi:10.1525/ctx.2010.9.3.22. Text.
- Sayer, Liana; England, Paula; Allison, Paul; Kangas, Nicole (May 2011). "She left, he left: how employment and satisfaction affect women's and men's decisions to leave marriages". American Journal of Sociology. 116 (6): 1982–2018. doi:10.1086/658173. PMC 3347912. PMID 21932472.
- Armstrong, Elizabeth; England, Paula; Fogarty, Alison (June 2012). "Accounting for women's orgasm and sexual enjoyment in college hookups and relationships". American Sociological Review. 77 (3): 435–462. doi:10.1177/0003122412445802. S2CID 146476877.
- England, Paula; Wu, Lawrence L.; Shafer, Emily Fitzgibbons (December 2013). "Cohort trends in premarital births: what role for the retreat from marriage?". Demography. 50 (6): 2075–2104. doi:10.1007/s13524-013-0241-1. PMC 4682872. PMID 24072609.
