= List of feminist economists =

This is an incomplete alphabetical list by surname of notable feminist economists, experts in the social science of feminist economics, past and present. Only economists with biographical articles in Wikipedia are listed here.

== Feminist economists ==
=== A ===
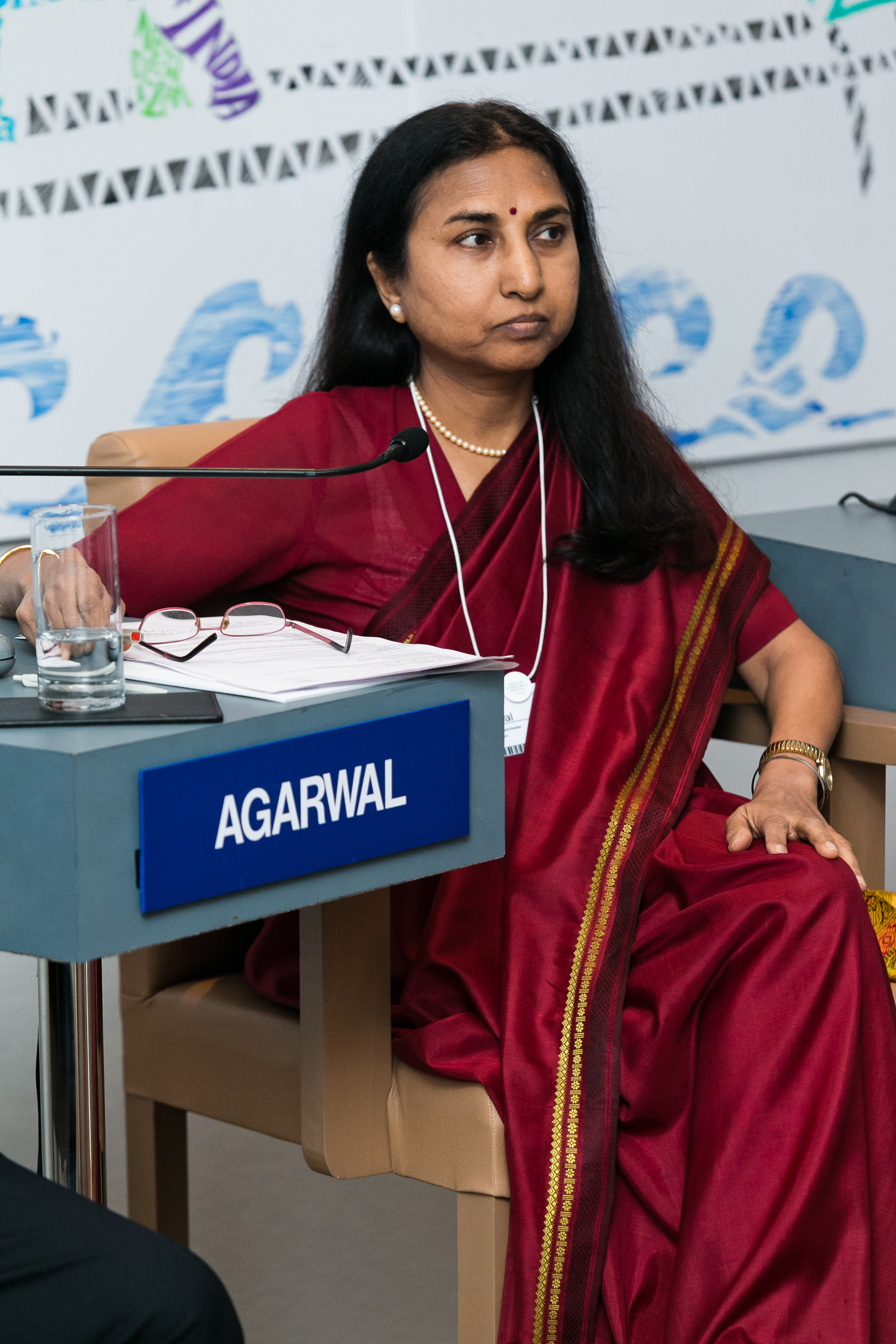
Bina Agarwal
- Bina Agarwal (Note: Past president / President / President-elect of the International Association for Feminist Economics (IAFFE)) (born 1951), Indian development economist
- Randy Albelda (born 1955), American labor and welfare economist; her research interests include gender and race, public policies, economics of taxation, and poverty
- Sabina Alkire, welfare economist with an interest in ethics
- Iulie Aslaksen, Norwegian environmental economist
- Siobhan Austen, Australian economist researching gendered aspects of population ageing

=== B ===
- Eudine Barriteau (born 1954), Barbadian professor of gender and public policy, and deputy principal, at the Nita Barrow Unit within the Institute of Gender and Development Studies, University of the West Indies, Cave Hill, Barbados
- Robin L. Bartlett, American professor for the economics department of Denison University, Granville, Ohio
- Amrita Basu (born 1953), American academic specializing in South Asian politics, with a particular interest in women's movements and other social movements
- Carolyn Baylies (1947–2003), American sociologist, active in international development
- Lourdes Benería (born 1937), Spanish professor of economics at Cornell University's Department of City & Regional Planning
- Silvia Berger, Argentine president of the International Association for Feminist Economics (IAFFE), 2017–2018
- Barbara Bergmann (1927–2015), American, with an interest in social policy and equality
- Margunn Bjørnholt (born 1958), Norwegian sociologist, economist, and social psychologist
- Anders Borg, Swedish politician and former Minister for Finance
- Heather Boushey (born 1970), American senior economist with the Center for American Progress

=== C ===
- Cecilia Conrad (born 1955), African-American academic with a particular interest in the effects of race and gender on economic status

=== D ===
- Séverine Deneulin (born 1974), senior lecturer in International Development at the Department of Social and Policy Sciences, University of Bath

=== E ===
- Diane Elson (born 1946), British gender and development social scientist

=== F ===
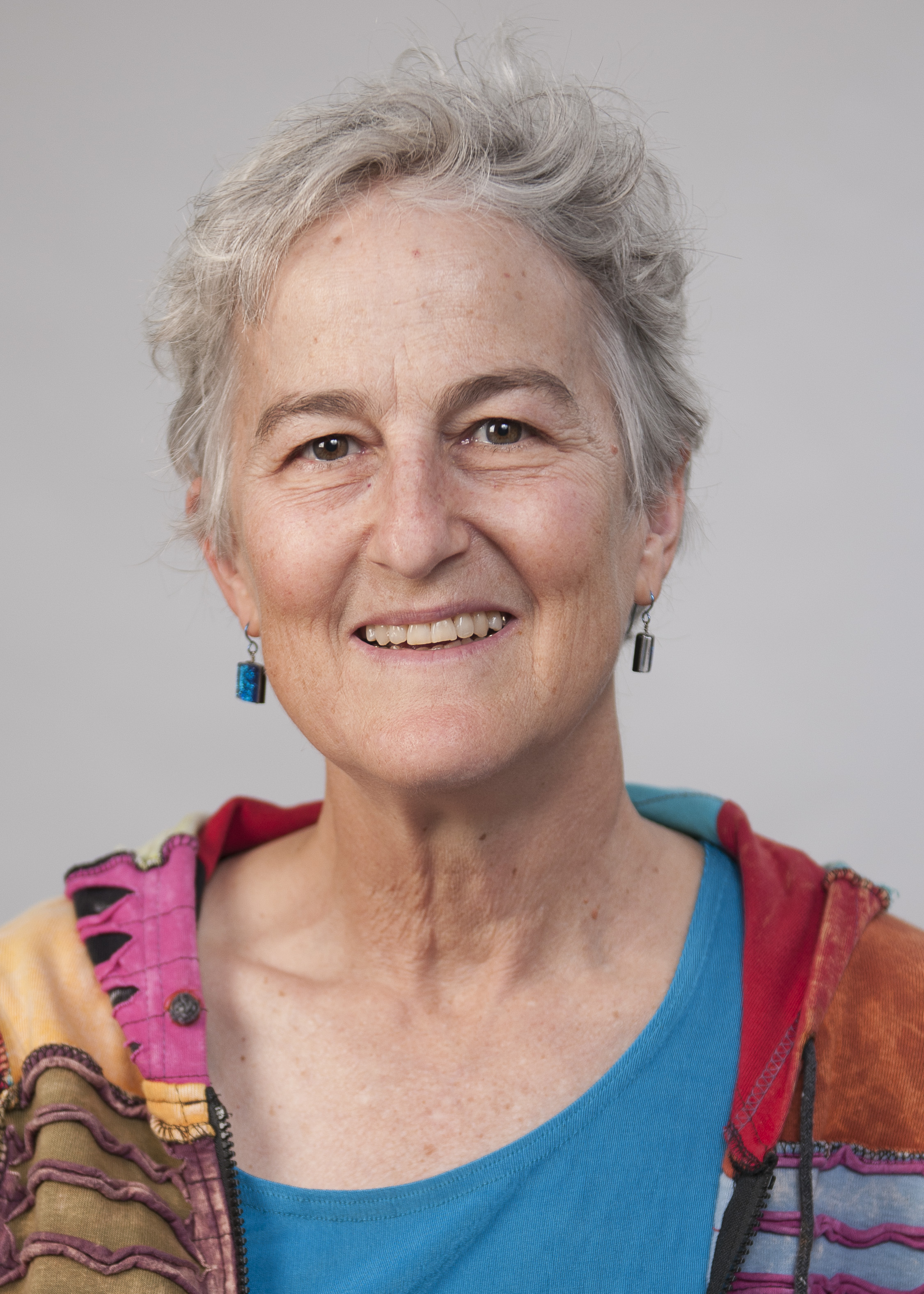
Nancy Folbre
- Marianne Ferber (1923–2013), American feminist economist, one of the first to confront Gary Becker's work on economics and the family
- Nancy Folbre (born 1952), focuses on family economics, non-market work and the economics of care
- Sakiko Fukuda-Parr (born 1950), Japanese development economist

=== G ===
- Jayati Ghosh (born 1955), Indian development economist
- Suman Ghosh (born 1972), Bengali film director and associate professor of economics at Florida Atlantic University
- Alicia Girón, Mexican president of the International Association for Feminist Economics (IAFFE), 2014–2015

=== H ===
- Lawrence Haddad (born 1959), British development economist
- Heidi Hartmann (born 1945), American founder and president of the Washington-based Institute for Women's Policy Research (IWPR), a research organization created to conduct women-centered, public policy research
- Susan Himmelweit (born 1948), British emeritus professor of economics for the Open University in the UK; member of the editorial boards of Feminist Economics and Journal of Women, Politics & Policy
- Jane Humphries (born 1948), British professor of economic history and Fellow of All Souls College at the University of Oxford

=== J ===
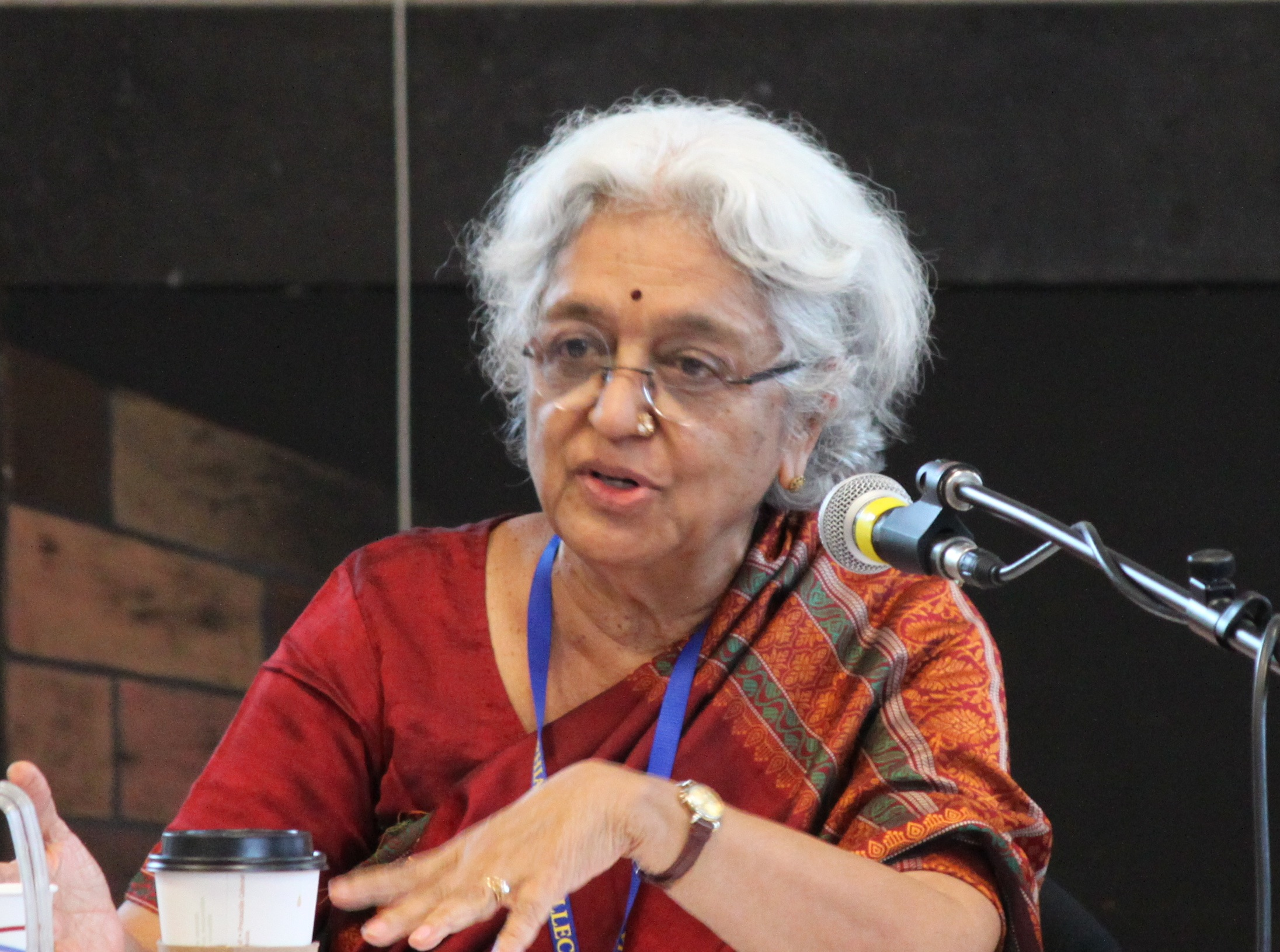
Devaki Jain

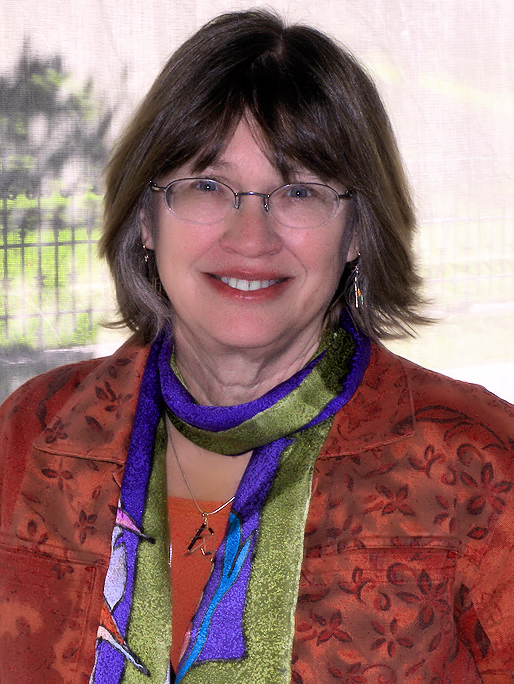
Jacqueline Jones
- Joyce Jacobsen, American professor of economics at Wesleyan University
- Devaki Jain (born 1933), Indian feminist writer
- Jacqueline Jones (born 1948), American social historian

=== K ===
- Naila Kabeer (born 1950), Bangladeshi-born British social economist, research fellow and writer
- Ravi Kanbur (born 1954), British former director and lead author of the World Bank's World Development Report
- Deniz Kandiyoti (born 1944), Turkish-British, emeritus professor in development studies at the School of Oriental and African Studies, University of London
- Edith Kuiper (born 1960), assistant professor of economics at State University of New York at New Paltz

=== M ===
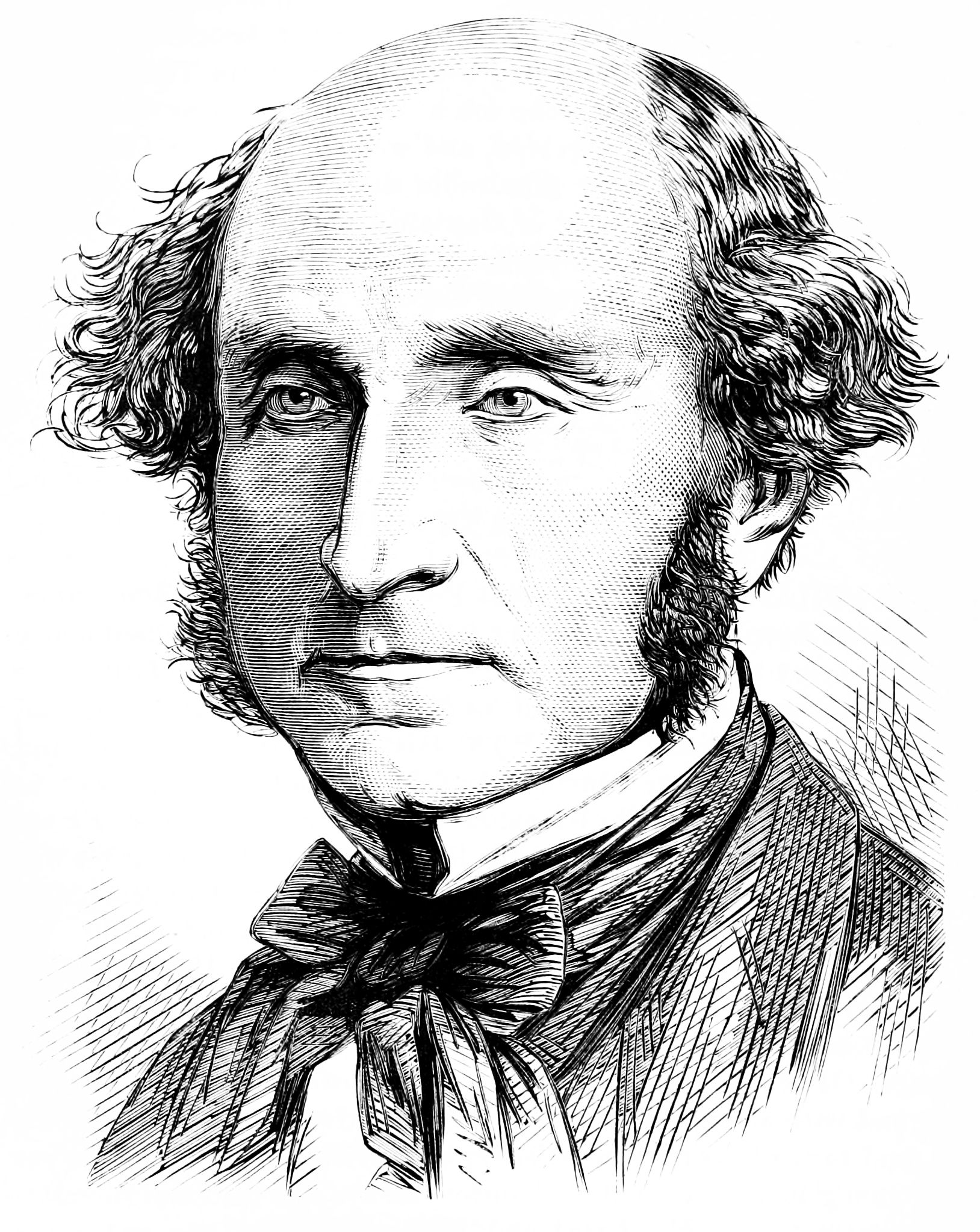
J. S. Mill
- Martha MacDonald, Canadian professor of economics, St Mary's University, Halifax, Nova Scotia, Canada
- Deirdre McCloskey, American professor of economics, history, English, and communication at the University of Illinois at Chicago (UIC)
- Ailsa McKay (1963–2014), professor of economics at Glasgow Caledonian University; advisor to the United Nations
- John Stuart Mill (1806–1873), British philosopher, political economist and civil servant

=== N ===
- Julie A. Nelson (born 1956), professor of economics at the University of Massachusetts Boston

=== O ===
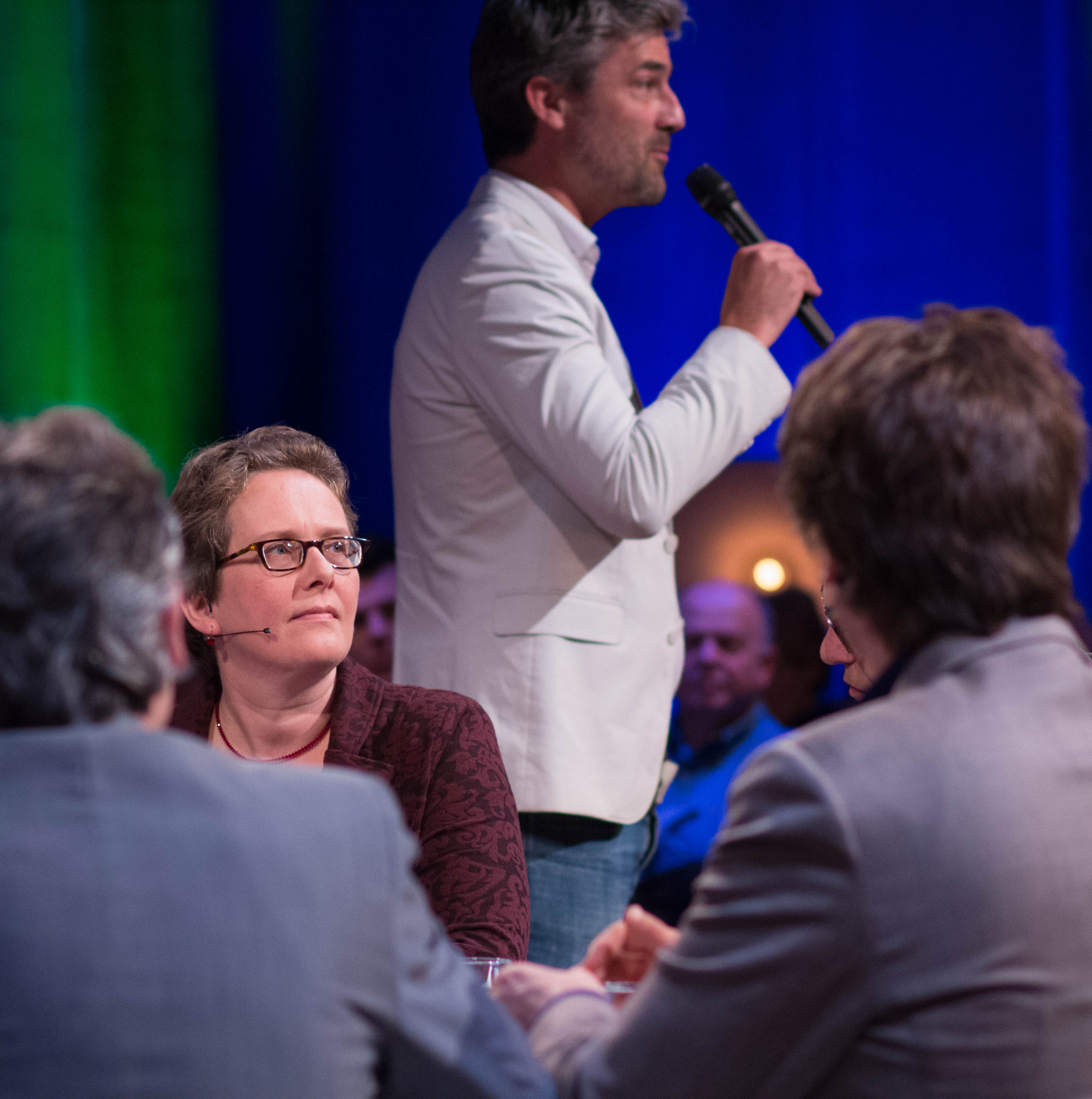
I. Robeyns
- Şemsa Özar, Turkish president of the International Association for Feminist Economics (IAFFE) 2015–2016

=== P ===
- Virginia Penny (1826–1914), independent scholar from Louisville, Kentucky

=== R ===
- Ingrid Robeyns (born 1972), Dutch-Belgium, chair of the Ethics of Institutions at Utrecht University, Faculty of Humanities and the associated Ethics Institute
- Yana van der Meulen Rodgers (born 1966), Dutch professor and graduate director within the Women's and Gender Studies department of Rutgers University

=== S ===
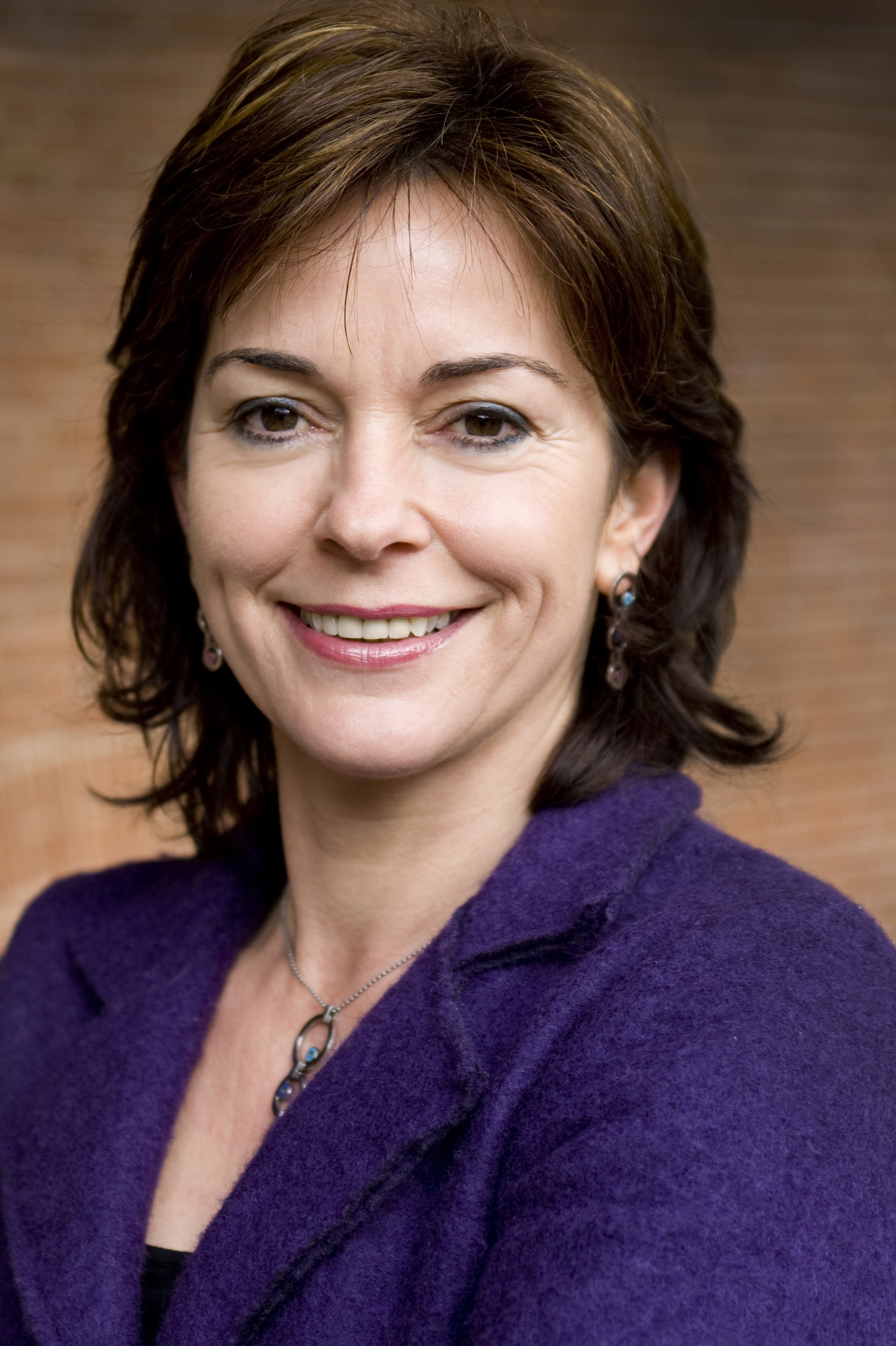
Jolande Sap

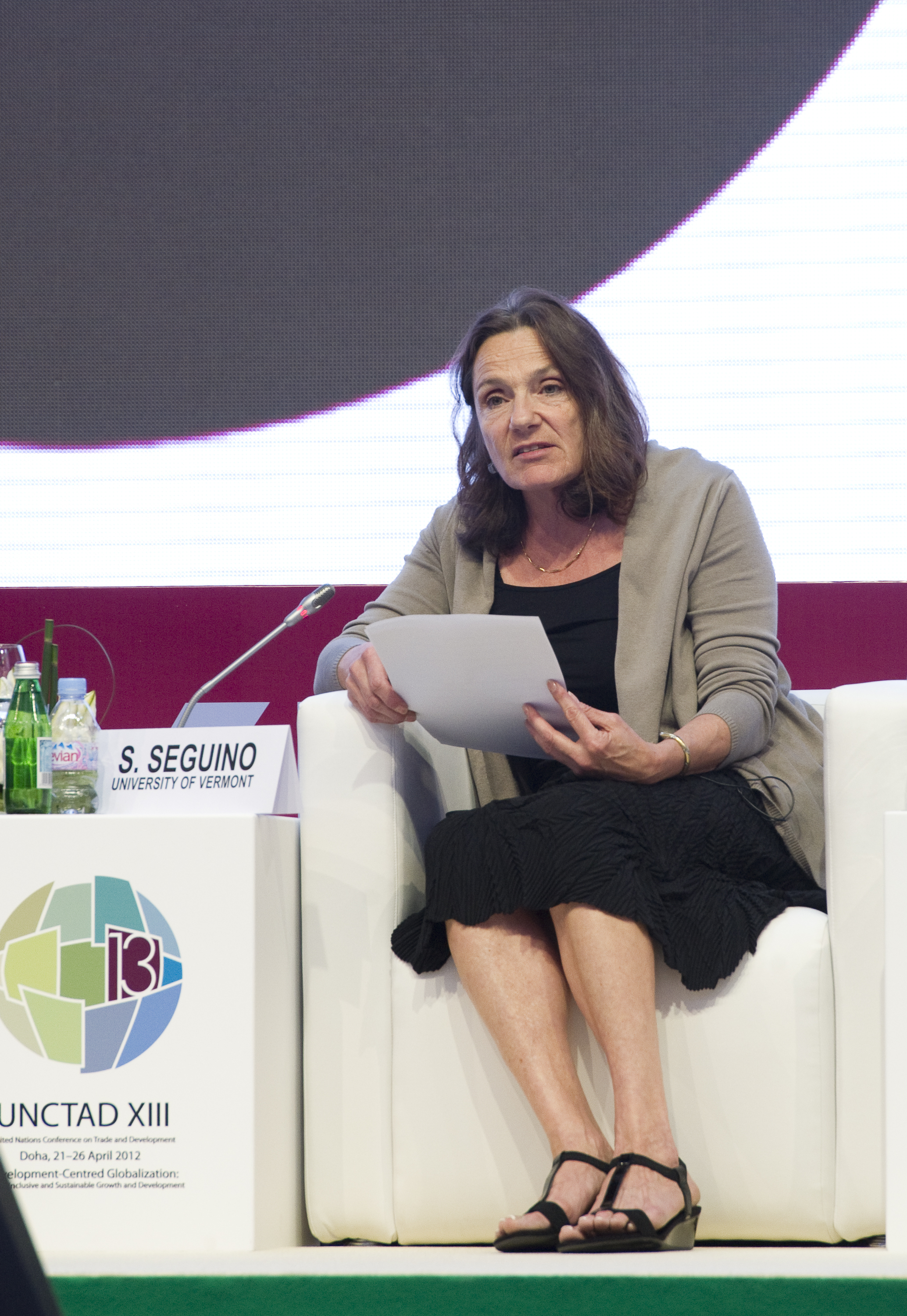
Stephanie Seguino

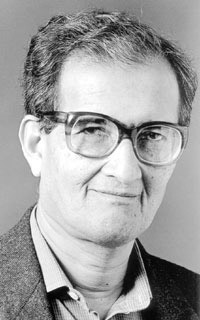
Amartya Sen
- Souad al-Sabah (born 1942), Kuwaiti economist and writer
- Jolande Sap (born 1963), Dutch GreenLeft (GroenLinks) politician and former educator and civil servant
- Stephanie Seguino, American professor of economics at the College of Arts and Sciences, University of Vermont (UVM), Burlington, Vermont
- Amartya Sen (born 1933), Indian Nobel Prize winning economist and philosopher
- Jean Shackelford (born 1946), American professor of economics emerita at Bucknell University, Lewisburg, central Pennsylvania
- Rhonda Sharp (born 1953), Australian adjunct professor of economics at the University of South Australia and project team leader and chief researcher of the university's Hawke Research Institute and Research Centre for Gender Studies
- Agneta Stark (born 1946), Swedish vice chancellor of Dalarna University, Sweden
- Myra Strober (born 1940), American professor of education, emerita, for the school of education, at Stanford Graduate School of Business, Stanford, California

=== T ===
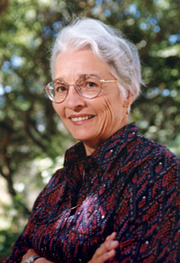
Irene Tinker
- Irene Tinker (born 1927), American founding board president of the International Center for Research on Women, founder and director of the Equity Policy Center and co-founder of the Wellesley Center for Research on Women
- Rosalba Todaro, Chilean economist and senior researcher at the Centro de Estudios de la Mujer (Women's Studies Centre) in Santiago, Chile

=== W ===
- Marilyn Waring (born 1952), New Zealand politician
- Beatrice Webb (1858–1943), English sociologist, economist, socialist, labour historian and social reformer
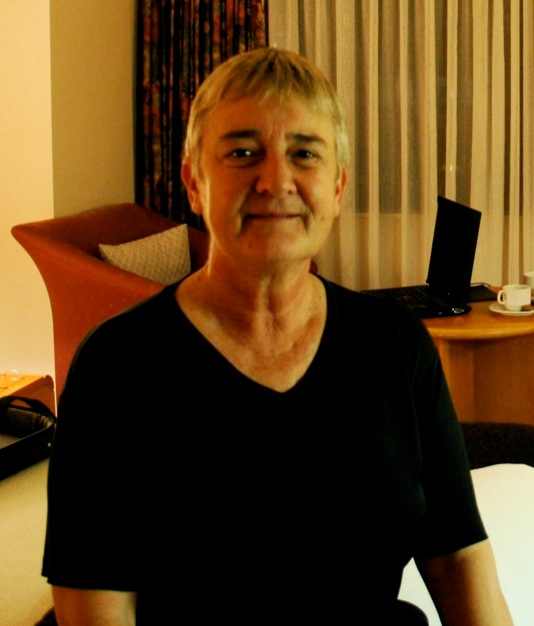
Marilyn Waring

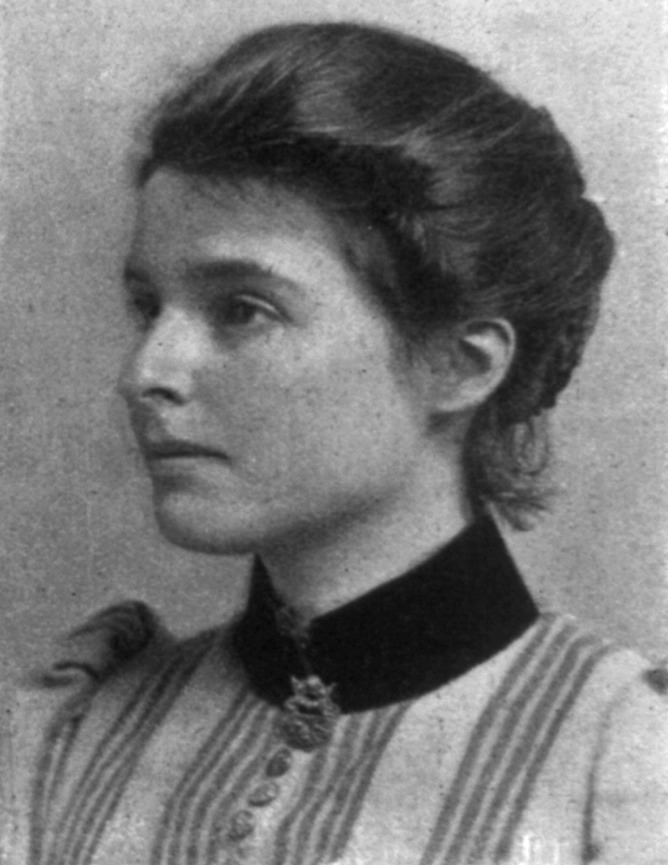
Beatrice Webb
- Isabella Weber (born 1987), German economist

=== Y ===
- Brigitte Young (born 1946), Austrian professor emeritus of international political economy at the Institute of Political Science, University of Münster, Germany

== See also ==
- Feminist economics
- Feminist Economics (journal)
- History of economic thought
- International Association for Feminist Economics
- Gender and development
- Economic inequality
- Intra-household bargaining
- Capability approach
