= Naila Kabeer =

Indian-born British Bangladeshi social economist, research fellow (born 1950)

- নায়লা কবির
- Born: 28 January 1950 (age 76); Calcutta, West Bengal, India

Academic background
- Education: London School of Economics; University College London

Academic work
- Discipline: Social economy
- School or tradition: Socioeconomics
- Institutions: London School of Economics; University of Gothenburg; Department for International Development

Naila Kabeer (Bengali: নায়লা কবির; born 28 January 1950) is an Indian-born British Bangladeshi social economist, research fellow, writer and professor at the London School of Economics. She was also president of the International Association for Feminist Economics (IAFFE) from 2018 to 2019. She is on the editorial committee of journals such as Feminist Economist, Development and Change, Gender and Development, Third World Quarterly and the Canadian Journal of Development Studies. She works primarily on poverty, gender and social policy issues. Her research interests include gender, poverty, social exclusion, labour markets and livelihoods, social protection, focused on South and South East Asia.

== Early life ==
Kabeer was born in Calcutta, West Bengal, India, but her family migrated to East Bengal, (now Bangladesh) soon after. She went to school at Loreto Convent in Shillong in India. In 1969, she came to the United Kingdom for further education. She did her B.Sc. in economics at the London School of Economics, her M.Sc. in economics at University College London and then returned to the London School of Economics for her Ph.D. She completed her Ph.D. in 1985. Kabeer did her PhD fieldwork in a village in Bangladesh.

== Career ==
In 1985, Kabeer joined the Institute of Development Studies at Sussex as a research fellow and later became a professorial fellow. In 2010, she joined the School of Oriental and African Studies, University of London as professor of development studies. In 2013, she joined the Gender Institute at the London School of Economics and Political Science as professor of gender and international development, where she has been since. Kabeer was the Kerstin Hesselgren Professor at the University of Gothenburg, Sweden from 2004 to 2005 and Senior Sabaticant with International Development Research Centre Regional Office in South Asia from 2005 to 2006. She also worked as a senior research fellow at the Department for International Development, UK from 2009 to 2010. She remains as an emeritus fellow at the Institute of Development Studies, Sussex.

Kabeer has been active in developing frameworks and methodologies for integrating gender concerns into policy and planning. She is a social economist and works primarily on poverty, gender and social policy issues. She has been active in developing frameworks and methodologies for integrating gender concerns into policy and planning and has experience of training and advisory work with governments, bilateral and multilateral agencies and NGOs including Oxfam, ActionAid, Women for Women International, BRAC, PRADAN and Nijera Kori. Additionally, she has worked with a number of international development agencies including the United Nations Development Programme (UNDP), UNICEF, World Bank, UN Women, Swedish International Development Cooperation Agency (SIDA), Norwegian Agency for Development Cooperation (NORAD), and DIFD. She is also on the board of the Women's Rights Program of the Open Society Foundations, of the International Centre for Research on Women which is an advisory committee of the International Labour Organization's Better Works Program.

Kabeer is the author of numerous books and journal publications. She is the author of Reversed Realities: Gender Hierarchies in Development Thought, Vero, 1994 and The Power to Choose: Bangladeshi Women and Labour Market Decisions in London and Dhaka, Verso 2000. She collaborated with UNRISD for the programme Social Effects of Globalization and wrote three papers: Gender, Demographic Transition and the Economics of Family Size: Population Policy for a Human-Centred Development in 1996; The Conditions and Consequences of Choice: Reflections on the Measurement of Women's Empowerment in 1999; and Leaving the Rice Fields but Not the Countryside: Gender, Livelihood Diversification and Pro-Poor Growth in Rural Viet Nam in 2000. For the UNRISD programme Gender and Development, she co-edited a Routledge/UNRISD book Global Perspectives on Gender Equality: Reversing the Gaze in 2007. Kabeer has worked with the United Nations Division for the Advancement for Women (DAW) as the lead author on The World Survey on Women and Development in 2009. For the UNRISD programme Social Policy and Development, she co-edited another Routledge/UNRISD volume "Social Protection As Development Policy: Asian Perspectives" in 2010.

Kabeer is currently on advisory editorial committee for the board of the Feminist Review Trust. She is also on the Advisory Committee for Better Work. She is currently engaged in research on social protection strategies and struggles for citizenship among workers in the informal economy. Kabeer is also involved in ERSC-DIFD Funded research on Gender and Labour Market dynamics in Bangladesh and India.

== Selected bibliography ==
=== Books ===
- Kabeer, Naila (1989). The quest for national identity: Women, Islam and the state in Bangladesh. Brighton, England: Institute of Development Studies. ISBN 9780903715225.
- Kabeer, Naila (1991). Gender, production and well-being: rethinking the household economy. Brighton, England: Institute of Development Studies. ISBN 9780903715423.
- Kabeer, Naila (1994). Reversed realities: gender hierarchies in development thought. London New York: Verso Books. ISBN 9780860915843.
- Kabeer, Naila; Subramanian, Ramya (1999). Institutions, relations and outcomes: A framework and case studies for gender-aware planning. New Delhi, India: Zubaan. ISBN 9788185107981.
- Kabeer, Naila (2000). The power to choose: Bangladeshi women and labour market decisions in London and Dhaka. London New York: Verso Books. ISBN 9781859848043.
- Kabeer, Naila; Cook, Sarah; Suwannarat, Gary (2002). Social protection in Asia. New Delhi, India: Har-Anand Publications. ISBN 9788124108819.
- Kabeer, Naila (2003). Gender mainstreaming in poverty eradication and the millennium development goals. London Ottawa: Commonwealth Secretariat. ISBN 9780850927528.
- Kabeer, Naila; Subrahmanian, Ramya; Nambissan, Geetha (2003). Child labour and the right to education in South Asia. Thousand Oaks, California: SAGE Publications. ISBN 9780761996019.
- Kabeer, Naila (2005). Inclusive citizenship: meanings and expressions. New Delhi, India: Zed Books. ISBN 9788189013165.
- Kabeer, Naila (2008). Mainstreaming gender in social protection for the informal economy. London: Commonwealth Secretariat. ISBN 9780850928402.
- Kabeer, Naila (2010). Gender & social protection strategies in the informal economy. India: Routledge. ISBN 9780415578257.
- Kabeer, Naila; Cook, Sarah (2010). Social protection as development policy: Asian perspectives. London New York: Routledge. ISBN 9780415585736.

=== Chapters in books ===
- Kabeer, Naila (1992), "Feminist perspectives in development: a critical review", in Phoenix, Ann; Hinds, Hilary; Stacey, Jackie (eds.), Working out: New directions for women's studies, Gender and Society: Feminist Perspectives on Past and Present, London Washington, D.C: The Falmer Press, pp. 101–112, ISBN 9780750700436.
- Kabeer, Naila; Cortijo, Marie Jo A. (2005), "Methodological and organizational lessons from impact assessment studies: the case of SHARE, India", in Brody, Alyson; Greely, Martin; Wright-Revolledo, Katie (eds.), Money with a mission: volume 2: managing social performance of microfinance, London: Practical Action, ISBN 9781853396151
- Kabeer, Naila; Dash, Anup (2005), "The challenge of sustainability in India's poorest state: the case of the Centre for Youth and Social Development (CYSD)", in Brody, Alyson; Greely, Martin; Wright-Revolledo, Katie (eds.), Money with a mission: volume 2: managing social performance of microfinance, London: Practical Action, ISBN 9781853396151

=== Journal articles ===
- Kabeer, Naila (May 1998). "'Education is my daughter's future'". Index on Censorship. 27 (3): 154–160. doi:10.1080/03064229808536365. S2CID 220929243.
- Kabeer, Naila (March 2004). "Globalization, labor standards, and women's rights: dilemmas of collective (in)action in an interdependent world". Feminist Economics. 10 (1): 3–35. doi:10.1080/1354570042000198227. S2CID 17533079.
- Kabeer, Naila; Mumtaz, Khawar; Sayeed, Asad (January 2010). "Beyond risk management: Vulnerability, social protection and citizenship in Pakistan". Journal of International Development. 22 (1): 1–19. doi:10.1002/jid.1538.
- Kabeer, Naila (March 2011). "Between affiliation and autonomy: navigating pathways of women's empowerment and gender justice in rural Bangladesh". Development and Change. 42 (2): 499–528. doi:10.1111/j.1467-7660.2011.01703.x. PMID 21898946.
- Kabeer, Naila (May 2011). "Gender, schooling and global social justice". Comparative Education. 47 (2): 283–284. doi:10.1080/03050068.2011.555142. S2CID 145347608.
- Kabeer, Naila (September 2012). "Empowerment, citizenship and gender justice: a contribution to locally grounded theories of change in women's lives". Ethics and Social Welfare. 6 (3): 216–232. doi:10.1080/17496535.2012.704055. S2CID 55205837.
- Kabeer, Naila; Khan, Ayesha (July 2014). "Cultural values or universal rights? Women's narratives of compliance and contestation in urban Afghanistan". Feminist Economics. 20 (3): 1–24. doi:10.1080/13545701.2014.926558. S2CID 144805658.
- Kabeer, Naila (May 2015). "Gender, poverty, and inequality: a brief history of feminist contributions in the field of international development". Gender and Development. 23 (2): 189–205. doi:10.1080/13552074.2015.1062300. S2CID 142104063.
- Kabeer, Naila; Gammage, Sarah; Rodgers, Yana van der Meulen (January 2016). "Introduction: Voice and agency: where are we now?". Feminist Economics. 22 (1): 1–29. doi:10.1080/13545701.2015.1101308. S2CID 146657580.
- Kabeer, Naila (January 2016). "Gender equality, economic growth, and women's agency: the "Endless Variety" and "Monotonous Similarity" of patriarchal constraints". Feminist Economics. 22 (1): 295–321. doi:10.1080/13545701.2015.1090009. S2CID 153522849.

== See also ==
- British Bangladeshi
- Feminist economics
- List of British Bangladeshis
- List of feminist economists

Non-profit organisation positions
Preceded by Silvia Berger	President of the International Association for Feminist Economics; 2018–2019	Succeeded by Cheryl Doss
