= Jean Shackelford =

American economist (born 1946)

- Born: Jean A. Shackelford; 1946 (age 79–80)

Academic background
- Education: University of Kentucky

Academic work
- Discipline: Feminist economics
- Institutions: Bucknell University, Lewisburg, US

Jean A. Shackelford (born 1946), is a professor of economics emerita in the department of economics at Bucknell University, Lewisburg, central Pennsylvania, US and, from 1993 to 1995, was the president of the International Association for Feminist Economics (IAFFE). Her book Economics: a tool for critically understanding society, co-written with Tom Riddell, Stephen C. Stamos and Geoffrey Schneider, is now in its ninth edition.

Her research interests are: the history of economic thought; economic pedagogy; and, economics and technology.

== Education ==
Jean Shackleford received her degree from Kansas State University in 1967. Her masters, in 1968, and her doctorate, in 1974, were both from the University of Kentucky. All three qualifications were for economics.

== Selected bibliography ==
=== Books ===
- Shackelford, Jean A. (1980). Urban and regional economics: a guide to information sources. Detroit, Michigan: Gale Research Co. ISBN 9780810313033.
- Shackelford, Jean A.; Riddell, Tom; Stamos, Stephen C (1991). Economics: a tool for understanding society (4th ed.). Reading, Massachusetts: Addison-Wesley Publishing Co. ISBN 9780201509052.
- Shackelford, Jean A.; Riddell, Tom; Stamos, Stephen C; Schneider, Geoffrey (2011). Economics: a tool for critically understanding society (9th ed.). Boston, Massachusetts: Addison-Wesley Publishing Co. ISBN 9780131368491.

=== Chapters in books ===
- Shackelford, Jean A.; Quinlan, Daniel C (2001), "Economy and English families, 1500-1850", in Rotberg, Robert I. (ed.), Population history and the family: a journal of interdisciplinary history reader, Cambridge, Massachusetts: MIT Press, pp. 45–78, ISBN 9780262182126

=== Journal articles ===
- Shackelford, Jean A. (May 1992). "Feminist pedagogy: a means for bringing critical thinking and creativity to the economics classroom". The American Economic Review: Papers and Proceedings. 82 (2). American Economic Association: 570–576. JSTOR 2117463.
- Shackelford, Jean A.; Bartlett, Robin L; Aerni, April Laskey; Lewis, Margaret; McGoldrick, KimMarie (January 1999). "Toward a feminist pedagogy in economics". Feminist Economics. 5 (1): 29–44. doi:10.1080/135457099338139.
- Shackelford, Jean A. (January 1999). "Assessing the strengths and limits of websites: the webform in action". Feminist Economics. 5 (1): 87–90. doi:10.1080/135457099338184.
- Shackelford, Jean A.; Schneider, Geoff (January 2001). "Economics standards and lists: proposed antidotes for feminist economists". Feminist Economics. 7 (2): 77–89. doi:10.1080/13545700110059243. S2CID 143489921.

=== Papers ===
- Shackelford, Jean A. (1970), "On thresholds, take-offs and spurts: a place for SMSAs in growth center strategy", Program on the Role of Growth Centers in Regional Economic Development: Discussion Paper, 27, Lexington, Kentucky: University of Kentucky

== See also ==
- IAFFE
- Feminist economics
- List of feminist economists

Non-profit organisation positions
New creation	President of the International Association for Feminist Economics; 1993-1995	Succeeded by Marianne Ferber
