= Julie A. Nelson =

American feminist economist

Julie Nelson
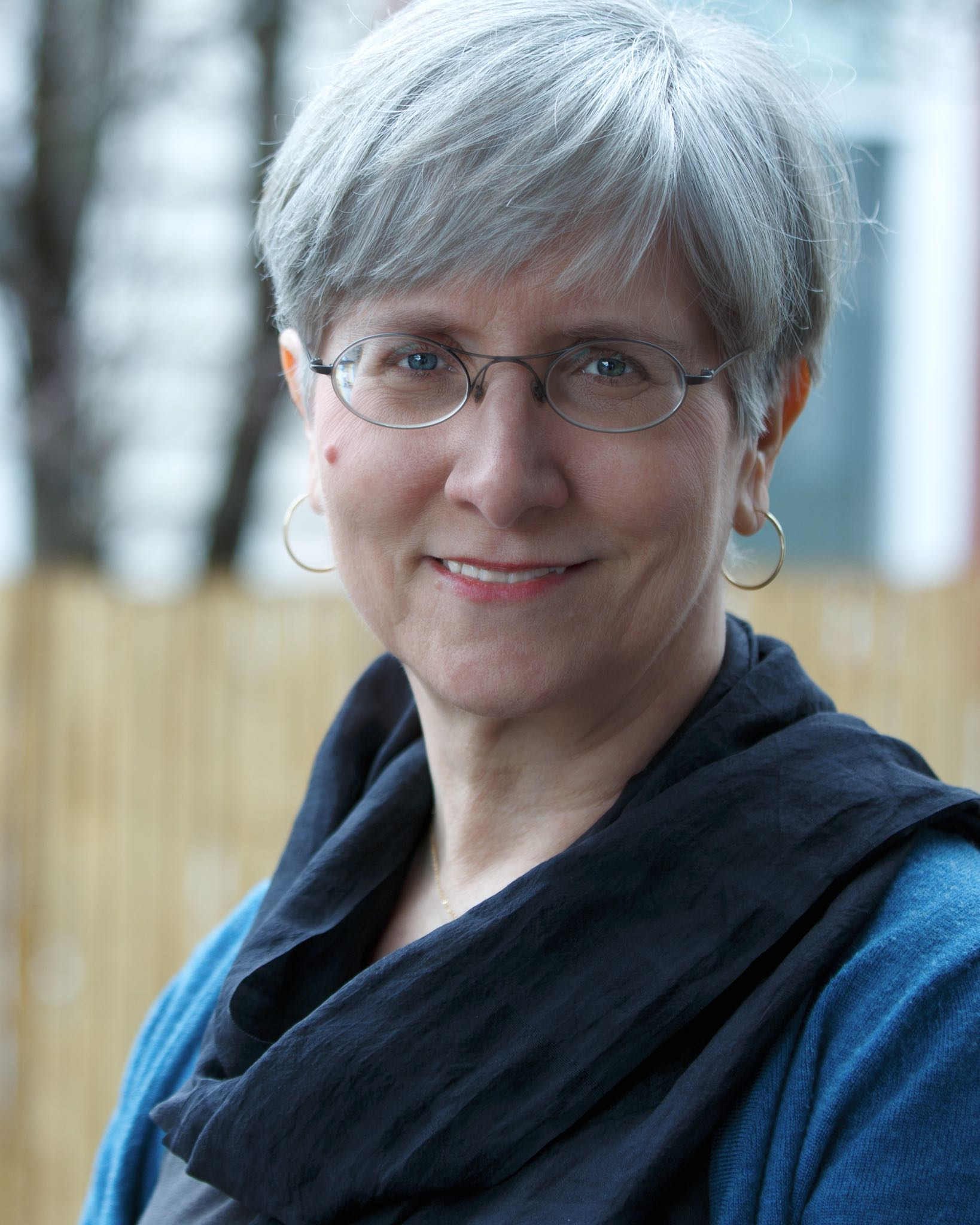
- Born: 1956 (age 69–70)

Academic background
- Education: St. Olaf College (BA); University of Wisconsin, Madison (MA, PhD)

Academic work
- Discipline: Economics
- School or tradition: Feminist economics
- Institutions: Bureau of Labor Statistics; University of California, Davis; University of Massachusetts, Boston; Global Development and Environment Institute
- Notable ideas: Application of feminist theory to questions of the definition of the discipline of economics
- Website: Information at IDEAS / RePEc

Julie A. Nelson (born 1956) is an emeritus professor of economics at the University of Massachusetts Boston, most known for her application of feminist theory to questions of the definition of the discipline of economics, and its models and methodology. Nelson received her Ph.D. degree in economics from the University of Wisconsin–Madison. Her work focuses on gender and economics, philosophy and methodology of economics, ecological economics, and quantitative methods. Nelson is among the founders and the most highly cited scholars in the field of feminist economics.

== Education ==
Nelson graduated from St. Olaf College with a B.A. in economics in 1978. Nelson earned a M.A. in economics from the University of Wisconsin-Madison in 1982. In 1986, Nelson also received a Ph.D. from the University of Wisconsin-Madison.

== Career ==
Beyond Economic Man: Feminist Theory and Economics, a 1993 book Nelson co-edited with Marianne A. Ferber, has been called a 'landmark' and the 'manifesto' of feminist economics. A follow-up volume, Feminist Economics Today, summarizes the development of the field over the following ten years. Nelson is author, co-author, or editor of numerous academic articles and books on both feminist theory and the empirical study of behavior, as well as a co-author of the "in Context" series of economics textbooks.

Her 2006 book (2nd edition, 2018) Economics for Humans dismisses the view that markets are inexorable "machines" and discusses how a better understanding of the relation of economics and values could improve both business and care work. She argues that the current approach to studying the economy as though it were an asocial machine, using only tools that emphasize 'detachment, mathematical reasoning, formality and abstraction', is narrow and damaging. She suggests that the metaphor of a "beating heart" would better frame discussions about the economy in terms of values. Other recent work addresses issues of ethics and economics, and particularly in relation to climate change, and how stereotypes about women have distorted recent behavioral economics research.

Nelson was a founding member of the International Association for Feminist Economics, an associate editor of the journal Feminist Economics, the 2019 President of the Association for Social Economics, and is the Economics Section editor of the Journal of Business Ethics. Nelson started her career at the United States Bureau of Labor Statistics, subsequently became a tenured associate professor at the University of California, Davis, and then moved to the Boston, Massachusetts area, where she was professor of economics at the University of Massachusetts Boston and a senior research fellow with the Global Development and Environment Institute.

== Selected bibliography ==
=== Books ===
- Nelson, Julie A.; Ferber, Marianne (1993). Beyond economic man: feminist theory and economics. Chicago: University of Chicago Press. ISBN 9780226242019.
- Nelson, Julie A. (1996). Feminism, objectivity and economics. London New York: Routledge. ISBN 9780203435915.
- Nelson, Julie A.; Ferber, Marianne (2003). Feminist economics today: beyond economic man. Chicago: University of Chicago Press. ISBN 9780226242071.

Reviewed by Robeyns, Ingrid (2005). "Feminist economics today, edited by Marianne A. Ferber and Julie A. Nelson". Journal of Economic Methodology. 12 (4): 613–617. doi:10.1080/13501780500365592. S2CID 216138345.

- Nelson, Julie A. (2006). Economics for humans. Chicago: University of Chicago Press. ISBN 9780226572024.
- Nelson, Julie A. (2018). Economics for humans, 2nd Ed. Chicago: University of Chicago Press. ISBN 9780226463803.
- Nelson, Julie A. (2018). Gender and Risk-Taking: Economics, Evidence, and Why the Answer Matters. New York: Routledge. ISBN 9781138284036.
- Nelson, Julie Seido (2025). Practicing Safe Zen: Navigating the Pitfalls on the Road to Liberation. Rhinebeck, NY: Monkfish Book Publishing. ISBN 9781958972786.

=== Book chapters ===
- Nelson, Julie A. (2014), "Forward", in Bjørnholt, Margunn; McKay, Ailsa (eds.), Counting on Marilyn Waring: New Advances in Feminist Economics, Demeter Press/Brunswick Books, ISBN 9781927335277
- Nelson, Julie A. (2019), "Climate change and economic self-interest", in Kanbur, Ravi; Shue, Henry (eds.), Climate Justice: Integrating Economics and Philosophy, Oxford: Oxford University Press, ISBN 9780198813248

=== Journal articles ===
- Nelson, Julie A. (November 1988). "Household economies of scale in consumption: theory and evidence". Econometrica. 56 (6): 1301–1314. doi:10.2307/1913099. JSTOR 1913099.
- Nelson, Julie A. (April 1992). "Gender, metaphor, and the definition of economics". Economics and Philosophy. 8 (1): 103–125. doi:10.1017/S026626710000050X. S2CID 146493891.
- Nelson, Julie A. (September 1992). "Methods of estimating household equivalence scales: an empirical investigation". Review of Income and Wealth. 38 (3): 295–310. doi:10.1111/j.1475-4991.1992.tb00427.x. Pdf.
- Nelson, Julie A. (Spring 1995). "Feminism and economics". Journal of Economic Perspectives. 9 (2): 131–148. doi:10.1257/jep.9.2.131.
- Nelson, Julie A. (January–February 1996). "What is feminist economics all about?". Challenge: The Magazine of Economic Affairs. 39 (1): 4–8. JSTOR 40721660.
- Nelson, Julie A. (Summer 2006). "Can we talk? Feminist economists in dialogue with social theorists". Signs: Journal of Women in Culture and Society. 31 (4): 1051–1074. doi:10.1086/500599. JSTOR 10.1086/500599. S2CID 36171639.
- Nelson, Julie A. (January 2016). "Husbandry: a (feminist) reclamation of masculine responsibility for care" (PDF). Cambridge Journal of Economics. 40 (1): 1–15. doi:10.1093/cje/bev060.
- Nelson, Julie A. (2014). "The power of stereotyping and confirmation bias to overwhelm accurate assessment: The case of economics, gender, and risk aversion". Journal of Economic Methodology. 21 (3): 211–231. doi:10.1080/1350178X.2014.939691. S2CID 145424855.

== See also ==
- Feminist economics
- List of feminist economists
