= Robin L. Bartlett =

American feminist economist

Robin Bartlett
- Born: Robin L. Bartlett

Academic background
- Education: Michigan State University

Academic work
- Discipline: Feminist economics
- Institutions: Denison University, Granville, Ohio, USA
- Awards: 2003 recipient of the Carolyn Shaw Bell Award

Robin L. Bartlett is a professor of economics at Denison University. She was among the founders of the International Association for Feminist Economics (IAFFE), and served as its president from 2005 to 2006.

== Education ==
Robin Bartlett gained her degree from Western College, Oxford, Ohio. She then went to Michigan State University where she earned her master's degree and doctoral degrees.

== Advice ==
She gives the following advice to young female economists:

First, the applause must come from within. Every time you do something and accomplish something, reward yourself with a trip to the spa, a nice dinner, time with friends, or whatever you like. It is very unusual to be recognized in this profession ... Second, find a small group of colleagues you can depend upon for honest criticism and support. Third, my dissertation advisor told me 30 years ago that no matter where you end up kept your mouth shut for the first year. I don't think I was able to heed that advice, but I think it is good advice. Finally, I learned ... to send your work out to everyone cited in your references—living or dead. Let people know you are a player. To solve the home versus work dilemmas, contract out —send out your laundry, hire a house cleaner, and get a baby sitter. It is expensive, but save scarce time for home and loved ones. Think of going to meetings and workshops as investing in you. Even if you have to pay for it yourself—do it. Network and see what other economists are doing.

— "Interview with Robin Bartlett, Recipient of the 2003 Carolyn Shaw Bell Award"

== Selected bibliography ==
=== Books ===
- Bartlett, Robin L (1997). Introducing race and gender into economics. London New York: Routledge. ISBN 9780415162838.

=== Journal articles ===
- Bartlett, Robin L. (Autumn 1998). "CSWEP: 25 years at a time". The Journal of Economic Perspectives. 12 (4): 177–183. doi:10.1257/jep.12.4.177. JSTOR 2646901.
- Bartlett, Robin L.; Shackelford, Jean A.; Aerni, April Laskey; Lewis, Margaret; McGoldrick, KimMarie (1999). "Toward a feminist pedagogy in economics". Feminist Economics. 5 (1): 29–44. doi:10.1080/135457099338139.
- Bartlett, Robin L.; Brown, Lariece M. (Summer 2008). "African Americans in the US Economy, by Cecilia A. Conrad, John Whitehead, Patrick Mason and James Stewart (book review)". Eastern Economic Journal. 34 (3): 410–412. doi:10.1057/palgrave.eej.9050048. S2CID 154488046.

== See also ==
- Feminist economics
- List of feminist economists

Non-profit organisation positions
Preceded by Bina Agarwal	President of the International Association for Feminist Economics; 2005–2006	Succeeded by Edith Kuiper
