= Şemsa Özar =

Turkish economist and feminist academic (1954–2026)

- Þemsa Özar
- Born: 15 March 1954; İzmir, Turkey
- Died: February 2026 (aged 71); Istanbul, Turkey

Academic background
- Education: Wirtschaftsuniversität Wien, Austria

Academic work
- Discipline: Feminist economics and development economics
- Institutions: Boğaziçi University; International Association for Feminist Economics
- Awards: International Policy Fellow, Open Society Institute

Şemsa Özar (Þemsa Özar; 15 March 1954 – February 2026) was a Turkish academic who was a professor of the Department of Economics at Boğaziçi University, Turkey. She served as president of the International Association for Feminist Economics from 2015 to 2016.

== Early life and education ==
Born on 15 March 1954, Özar gained her degree and masters from Boğaziçi University in Turkey in 1977 and 1978 respectively. Her post-graduate degree came from the Institute for Advanced Studies and Scientific Research, Vienna in 1988 and her PhD came from the Wirtschaftsuniversität Wien (Vienna University of Economics and Business) Austria in 1990. Her PhD thesis title was: The Effects of the IMF-Supported Programs on Income Distribution: Turkey as a Case.

== Death ==
Özar died after a long illness in February 2026, at the age of 71. Her body was taken to her hometown of İzmir and buried in the New Bornova Cemetery.

== Fellowships ==
- 2002 International Policy Fellow, Open Society Institute

== See also ==
- Feminist economics
- List of feminist economists

Non-profit organisation positions
Preceded by Alicia Girón	President of the International Association for Feminist Economics; 2015–2016	Succeeded by Joyce Jacobsen
