= Rhonda Sharp =

Australian economics professor (born 1953)

Rhonda Sharp AM
- Born: Rhonda Dawn Sharp; 1953 (age 72–73)

Academic background
- Education: University of Sydney

Academic work
- Discipline: Feminist economist
- Institutions: Hawke Research Institute and Research Centre for Gender Studies, University of South Australia
- Awards: AM

Rhonda Dawn Sharp AM (born 1953), is an adjunct professor of economics at the University of South Australia and project team leader and chief researcher of the university's Hawke Research Institute and Research Centre for Gender Studies.

In 2007 Sharp was an advisor to the UN Women's Expert Group Meeting (EGM): Financing for gender equality and the empowerment of women, and from 2000 to 2001 she was the president of the International Association for Feminist Economics (IAFFE).

== Education ==
Rhonda Sharp gained a degree in economics (1975) and a diploma in education (1976) from the University of New England, Australia. She went to the University of Queensland where she achieved her master of economics in 1982. In 1997 Sharp qualified in her doctorate at the University of Sydney.

== Selected bibliography ==
- Sharp, Rhonda; Broomhill, Ray (1988). Short-changed: women and economic policies. Sydney Boston, Mass: Allen & Unwin. ISBN 9780043202197.
- Sharp, Rhonda; Budlender, Debbie; Allen, Kerri (1998). How to do a gender-sensitive budget analysis: contemporary research and practice. Canberra London: AusAID Commonwealth Secretariat. ISBN 9780868036151.
- Sharp, Rhonda; Schech, Susanne (2007). Gender analysis: concepts, tools, and practice: training manual for APEC 2007 gender focal point network workshop. Asia Pacific Economic Cooperation (APEC).
- Sharp, Rhonda; Broomhill, Ray (2012). Australia's parental leave policy and gender equality an international comparison. Adelaide: Australian Workplace Innovation and Social Research Centre. ISBN 9780987195098.
- Sharp, Rhonda; Mills, Julie; Franzway, Suzanne; Gill, Judy (2013). Challenging knowledge, sex and power: gender, work and engineering. New York: Routledge, IAFFE Book Series. ISBN 9780415676861.

== See also ==
- Feminist economics
- List of feminist economists

Non-profit organisation positions
Preceded by Barbara Bergmann	President of the International Association for Feminist Economics; 2000–2001	Succeeded by Jane Humphries
