= Marianne Ferber =

American feminist economist

- Born: Marianne A. Ferber; 30 January 1923; Czechoslovakia
- Died: May 11, 2013 (aged 90)

Academic background
- Education: University of Chicago

Academic work
- Discipline: Feminist economics
- Institutions: University of Illinois at Urbana-Champaign
- Awards: Carolyn Shaw Bell Award, 2001

Marianne A. Ferber (January 30, 1923 – May 11, 2013) was an American feminist economist and the author of many books and articles on the subject of women's work, the family, and the construction of gender. She held a Ph.D. from the University of Chicago.

She was most noted for her work as co-editor with Julie A. Nelson of the influential anthology Beyond Economic Man: Feminist Theory and Economics and her book The Economics of Women, Men and Work, co-authored with Francine D. Blau and Anne Winkler.

== Background ==
Ferber was born in Czechoslovakia and received her B.A. at McMaster University in Hamilton, Canada and her Ph.D. at the University of Chicago.

Her husband, Robert Ferber, was hired by the University of Illinois to teach in the economics department in 1948, but strict nepotism rules at Illinois prevented her from being hired as a full-time professor. Yet the economics department did hire her on a semester-by-semester basis because of a severe teacher shortage. In 1971, she was promoted from lecturer to assistant professor. In 1979, she became a full professor.

== Career and awards ==
Ferber was a professor of economics and served as head of women's studies (from 1979–1983 and 1991–1993) at University of Illinois at Urbana-Champaign; subsequently a professor emerita. From 1993-1995, she was the Horner Distinguished Visiting Professor at Radcliffe College. She served as a professor of economics at the University of Illinois for 38 years.

In the 1970s, she was a member of the Committee on the Status of Women in the Economics Profession. Later, she became a founding member of the International Association for Feminist Economics (IAFFE) and in 1995 and 1996 served as IAFFE’s president.

Also, she was the president of the Midwest Economic Association and received the McMaster University 1996 Distinguished Alumni Award for the Arts.

== Selected works ==
=== Books ===
- Ferber, Marianne; Nelson, Julie A. (1993). Beyond Economic Man: Feminist Theory and Economics. Chicago: University of Chicago Press. ISBN 9780226242019.
- Ferber, Marianne A.; Lowry, Helen M. (1995), "The sex differential in earnings: A reappraisal", in Humphries, Jane (ed.), Gender and Economics, Aldershot, England Brookfield, Vermont, USA: Edward Elgar, pp. 429–439, ISBN 9781852788438.
- Ferber, Marianne; Loeb, Jane W. (1997). Academic couples: problems and promises. Urbana: University of Illinois Press. ISBN 9780252066191.
- Ferber, Marianne (1998). Women in the Labor Market. Cheltenham, UK Northampton, MA, USA: E. Elgar Pub. ISBN 9781858984995.
- Ferber, Marianne; Nelson, Julie A. (2003). Feminist Economics Today: Beyond Economic Man. Chicago: University of Chicago Press. ISBN 9780226242071.

Reviewed by Robeyns, Ingrid (2005). "Feminist economics today, edited by Marianne A. Ferber and Julie A. Nelson". Theory and Research in Education. 12 (4): 613–617. doi:10.1080/13501780500365592. S2CID 216138345.

- Ferber, Marianne A; Blau, Francine D; Winkler, Anne E (2014). The economics of women, men, and work (seventh ed.). Boston: Pearson. ISBN 9780132992817.

== See also ==
- Feminist economics
- List of feminist economists

Non-profit organisation positions
| Preceded by Jean Shackelford | President of the International Association for Feminist Economics; 1995-1997 | Succeeded by Myra Strober |
