= Edith Kuiper =

Dutch feminist economist

- Born: 13 January 1960

Academic background
- Education: University of Amsterdam

Notes
- Thesis "The most valuable of all capital" : a gender reading of economic texts. (2001)

Edith Kuiper (born 1960) is the assistant professor of economics at State University of New York at New Paltz, and she was the president of the International Association for Feminist Economics (IAFFE) from 2006 to 2007.

In 1993 Kuiper organized a conference in Amsterdam called, Out of the Margins: feminist perspectives on economic theory. The conference provided a networking opportunity which resulted in the founding of FENN, the Feminist Economics Network in the Netherlands. Further networking led to the formation of the European 'chapter' of IAFFE being established, IAFFE European chapter's first meeting was held at the second Out of the Margins conference in 1998.

Her research areas are the history and philosophy of economics.

== Education ==
In February 2001 Kuiper gained her doctorate in economics from the University of Amsterdam.

== Selected bibliography ==
=== Books ===
- Kuiper, Edith; Sap, Jolande; Feiner, Susan; Ott, Notburga; Tzannatos, Zafiris (1995). Out of the margin: feminist perspectives on economics. London New York: Routledge. ISBN 9780415125758.
- Kuiper, Edith (2001). "The most valuable of all capital": a gender reading of economic texts (Ph.D thesis). Amsterdam: Thela Thesis. ISBN 9789051708141. Title page.
- Kuiper, Edith; Barker, Drucilla K (2003). Toward a feminist philosophy of economics. London New York: Routledge. ISBN 9780415283885.
- Kuiper, Edith; Barker, Drucilla K (2006). Feminist economics and the World Bank: history, theory and policy. London New York: Routledge (IAFFE Advances in Feminist Economics - Book 3). ISBN 9780415763813.
- Kuiper, Edith; Barker, Drucilla K (2010). Feminist economics (critical concepts in economics). Milton Park, Abingdon, Oxon New York: Routledge. ISBN 9780415439169.
- Kuiper, Edith (2014). Women's economic thought in the eighteenth century. New York: Routledge. ISBN 9780415495714.
- Kuiper, Edith (2022). A Herstory of Economics. Cambridge: Polity Press. ISBN 9781509538430.

=== Chapters in books ===
- Kuiper, Edith; Barker, Drucilla K. (2014), "Gender, class and location in the global economy", in Evans, Mary; Hemmings, Clare; Henry, Marsha; Johnstone, Hazel; Madhok, Sumi; Plomien, Ania; Wearing, Sadie (eds.), The SAGE handbook of feminist theory, Thousand Oaks, California: SAGE, pp. 500–513, ISBN 9781446252413.
- Kuiper, Edith (2015), "Feminism and/in economics", in Davis, John B.; Dolfsma, Wilfred (eds.), The Elgar companion to social economics (2nd ed.), Cheltenham, UK Northampton, Massachusetts, USA: Edward Elgar Publishing, pp. 213–232, ISBN 9781783478538. Preview.

=== Working papers ===
- Kuiper, Edith; Klarita, Gërxhani (2004). Tax evasive behavior and gender in a transition country (PDF). Amsterdam, Holland: Amsterdam Institute for Advanced Labour Studies, University of Amsterdam.

== See also ==
- Feminist economics
- List of feminist economists

Non-profit organisation positions
Preceded by Robin Bartlett	President of the International Association for Feminist Economics; 2006–2007	Succeeded by Martha MacDonald
