= Nancy Folbre =

American feminist economist

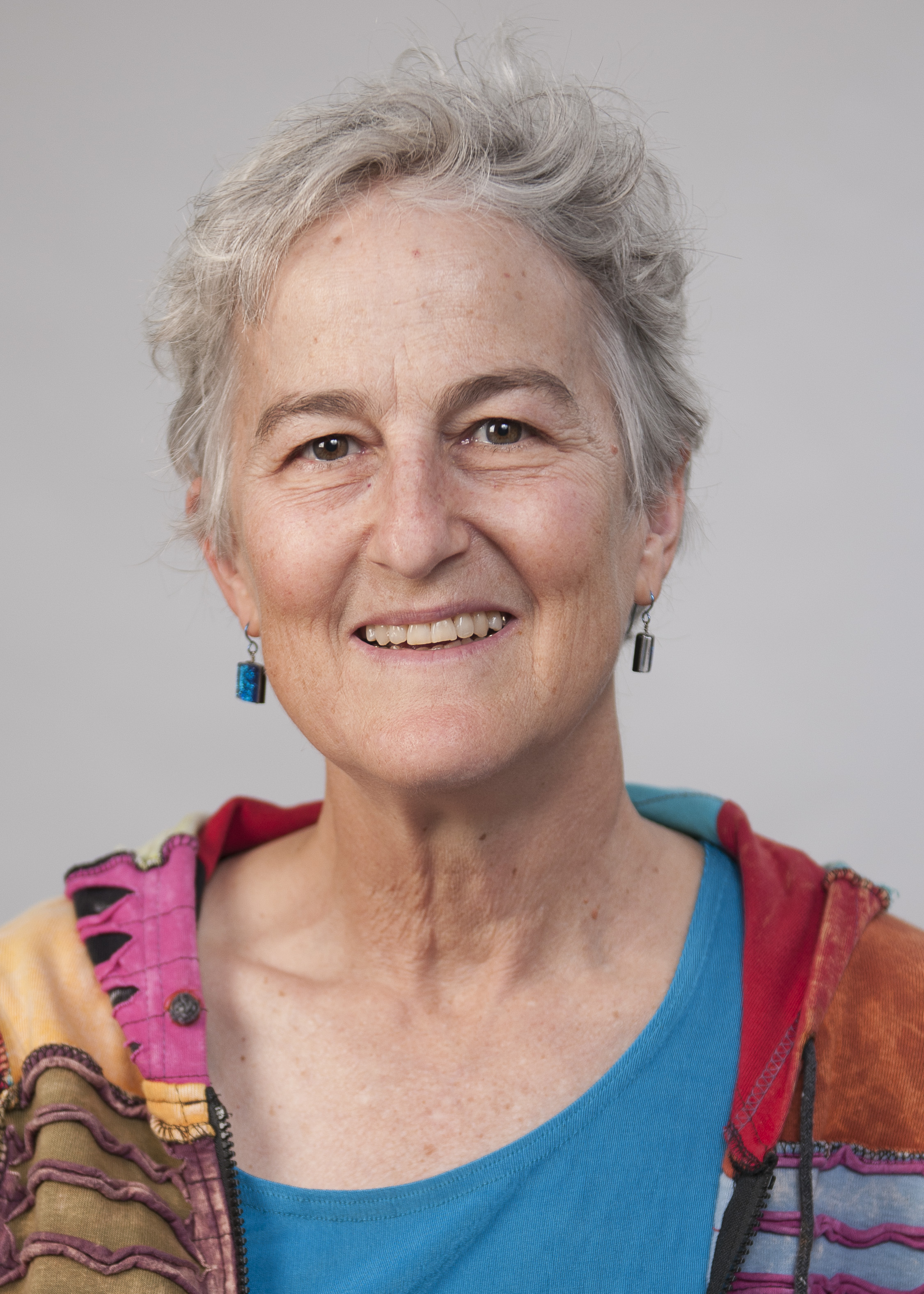
- Born: 19 July 1952 (age 74)

Academic work
- Institutions: University of Massachusetts Amherst, USA
- Notable ideas: Feminist economics
- Website: Information at IDEAS / RePEc

Nancy Folbre (19 July 1952) is an American feminist economist who focuses on economics and the family (or family economics), non-market work, and the economics of care work. She is professor of economics emerita at the University of Massachusetts Amherst.

Folbre served as president of the International Association for Feminist Economics (IAFFE) from 2002 to 2003. She has been an associate editor of the journal Feminist Economics since 1995, and is also a member of the editorial board of the Journal of Women, Politics & Policy. She delivered the inaugural Ailsa McKay Lecture in 2016.

== Early life and education ==
Folbre received a B.A. in philosophy from the University of Texas at Austin in 1971, an M.A. in Latin American studies from UT Austin in 1973, and a Ph.D. in economics from the University of Massachusetts Amherst in 1979.

== Focus ==
Folbre focuses on the economics of care, which she defines as, "work that involves connecting to other people, trying to help people meet their needs, things like the work of caring for children, caring for the elderly, caring for sick people or teaching is a form of caring labor," and she adds that caring labor can be paid or unpaid. Folbre argues that mainstream economists do not pay enough attention to the economics of care. This is detrimental to women because the exclusion of non-market and care work from mainstream economic analysis can marginalize women and children and undervalue their contributions to the home and the community.

Care is a unique form of work because it is "intrinsically motivated," in that not just money motivates people to care. Folbre argues that care work has been historically undervalued because it has been historically provided by women at low or no cost, and goes far to explain why women earn less than men. To this end, Folbre questions why women would even take care jobs and argues that the social construction of femininity links femininity and care. Folbre argues that only by working collectively to ensure a greater supply and quality of care, independent of the market, can we ensure that the responsibility of care is equitably distributed and not disproportionately placed upon women.

In her well-known book The Invisible Heart, Folbre explores the market and the individualistic competition that it engenders, and argues that the necessary care of elders and children is not provided in the market, yet is still absolutely necessary for society. Historically women have provided this care, whether as non-market work or low-paying market work. Folbre examines the social and governmental structures that support and provide for care, and their evolution throughout history. She concludes with the answer that we all have a responsibility to care for others, and provides a vision for the future in which care and care work are given greater priority and support.

Folbre has also written extensively on the social organization of time, namely the time allotted to care for children and the elderly and how family policies and social institutions limit the choices people can make between paid and unpaid work.

Folbre kept the blog 'Care Talk: coordinating research on care provision' from 2008 to 2009. She is a contributor to the New York Times Economix blog, an opportunity she has said she relishes because, "most academics spend a lot of time writing stuff that very few people will ever read."

== Professional achievements ==
Folbre was awarded a postdoctoral research fellowship by the Yale University Economic Growth center in 1979–1980. From 1995 to 1996 she received the French-American Foundation Fellowship for teaching and research in Paris. In 1999 she was awarded the Olivia Shieffelin Nordberg Award for Excellence in Writing and Editing in the Population Sciences, and in April 2004 she was named the Charlotte Perkins Gilman Fellow at the American Academy of Political and Social Science.

In 1989 Folbre was awarded a National Science Foundation grant to study Women's Work and Women's Households in Western Massachusetts between 1880 and 1910. She was awarded a five- year fellowship with the MacArthur Foundation in 1998, and the Leontief Prize of the Global Development and Environment Institute at Tufts University in 2004.

== Professional involvements ==
Folbre sits on the editorial board of the Journal of Women, Politics & Policy.

She was elected president of the International Association for Feminist Economics in 2002, and has been an associate editor of the journal Feminist Economics since 1995.

As of 2004 she was a member of the National Academy of Sciences Panel, which studied the design of non-market accounts. She has been a board member of the Foundation for Child Development since 2000, a member of the National Advisory Commission of Child Care and Early Education as well as the National Organization for Women Legal Defense and Education Fund since 2004.

== Books ==
=== Who Pays for the Kids? Gender and the Structures of Constraint (1994) ===
In this book, Folbre discusses how women's transition from the role of primary providers of care work to market-related production presents women with dilemmas. Even with women entering the paid labor force in growing numbers, they are still expected to perform most of the unpaid domestic labor. Women must choose how to divide their time between personal development and fulfillment and the expectations imposed by social norms. An increasing number of single mothers struggle with little or no support from estranged fathers, and while government subsidies may be available, they often only account for a portion of the support that once took place within families.

Folbre analyzes this situation through three major foci. First, she attempts to show that mainstream economics have failed to provide adequate models to explain relations between parents and children in terms of development, conflict and social welfare. She suggests that economists should pay less attention to mere accounting of production and more on social reproduction. Second, Folbre explores how a shift in the investment of time and resources toward children might result in losses for other groups. Understanding and addressing these conflicts between groups might lead to more efficient and satisfying means to providing care of children and the elderly. Finally, she examines what history has to say about the collective struggles over the costs of social reproduction.

=== The Ultimate Field Guide to the U.S. Economy (2000) ===
Along with James Heintz and other contributors from the Center for Popular Economics at the University of Massachusetts, Amherst, Folbre and her co-authors use wit and wisdom to expose the misconceptions about and uncover the realities of the U.S. economy. Each page addresses a single issue or concept that is accompanied by a cartoon or other artwork. While the book is written in simple, jargon-free language, the authors also have included a detailed glossary to help readers navigate through the economics terminology. This highly accessible book covers a wide spectrum of topics, including race and gender inequalities, labor issues, education, welfare, health government spending.

=== The Invisible Heart: Economics and Family Values (2001) ===
Measuring the value of care work is principally difficult because relationships of care are partly exchange transactions, and partly transactions involving what Folbre calls "the invisible heart." This metaphor represents family values of love and economic reciprocity, which she contrasts with Adam Smith's "invisible hand," in which the market forces of supply and demand exist alongside the pursuit of self-interest. While the forces of the free market and competitive individualism dominates public life, the forces of compassion must temper the forces of self-interest. Under the premise that people are rational optimizers, Folbre argues that if it is costly to be caring, people can be expected to engage in it less over time. If the opportunity cost of devoting time to family over a career is perceived to be high, or if proving care for the poor or sick pays poorly, then rational decision-makers will increasingly come to avoid care work. Folbre applauds the rising autonomy of women but argues that if we don't establish thoughtful rules defining our collective responsibilities for caregiving, the penalties suffered by the needy will increase. Intensified economic competition may drive altruism and families out of business.

The book is divided into three sections, in which Folbre explores a wide range of issues, from the view of the housekeeping state to the rights of pregnant workers in Mexico. Using a storytelling voice, she tells a sequence of wonderful stories of her own extended family and acquaintances in San Antonio. Folbre views corporations as profit-obsessed and corrupt tyrants and often sees governments as bloated bureaucratic regimes that serve few and punish the poor. While regressive taxation assures that some will be able to afford more care than others, unequal school funding guarantees class inequality.

Folbre compares the traditional role of women with the more contemporary career-oriented position of women. Where women have traditionally provided care within the home, this responsibility is slowly transitioning to third parties and corporate institutions. Profit motives will tend to drive the wages of care workers down. She notes that turnover rates among childcare staff are often in excess of 30 percent per year. According to Folbre, such under-provision of quality care is due to the mismatch between care's relational and public-good nature, as well as an economic system that stresses competition and individuality.

Folbre argues that radical changes to the way Americans live and work, democratic control of the economy, as well as a dramatic redistribution of wealth will strengthen the ethic of solidarity and social reciprocity. She concludes with a resounding call—to extend family values to society as a whole—and a series of policy proposals for increasing both the quality and the recognition of care.

=== Family Time: The Social Organization of Care (2004) ===
Edited by Nancy Folbre and Michael Bittman, this book contains a collection of eleven essays discussing a variety of topics related to child and elder care. Folbre's contributions include an introduction and three co-authored chapters. In her article entitled "A theory of the misallocation of time" (a play upon Gary Becker's article of a similar title), Folbre critiques Becker's neoclassical theory of gender specialization in the household. She also co-authors two additional chapters regarding the measurement of parental childcare time and nonparental care.

=== Valuing Children: Rethinking the Economics of the Family (2008) ===
In this book, Folbre discusses the costs of raising children, the value of child care to the economy, and how these costs are borne by society. She challenges the implicit view of mainstream economists who effectively view the raising of children as a process of consumption in which parents can derive happiness and how this view ignores the fact that children become the workers and taxpayers of the next generation. She argues that the time investment mothers make offers significant rewards in the reproduction of labor, and because of this, public policy should be designed to align private and public resources in promoting efficient commitments to the next generation.

Folbre considers ways to improve the accounting of the economic value of raising children and how the current methods of calculating the economic cost of having children fail to capture the value of the time spent in care work. Folbre provides a surprising estimate of the value of parental time per child by asking what it would cost to purchase a comparable substitute for it. Yet she also argues that, as part of the non-market sector, care work is economically undervalued by simply utilizing its replacement cost.

=== Greed, Lust and Gender: A History of Economic Ideas (2009) ===
Written shortly after the financial crash of 2008, Folbre explores how the boundaries between the pursuit of self-interest and immorality have become blurred. She argues that the mentality espoused by Oliver Stone's character Gordon Gekko that "greed is good," helped lead to the 2008 financial crisis and persists in its wake. Yet, the same social norms that consider aggression, greed and lust an advantage to men in public life also view such things as perverse in women. Folbre argues that this double standard often puts aspiring women in a difficult position, which forces women to choose between their personal identity and the acceptance of the expected gender role.

Folbre brings women's work, their sexuality, and their ideas into the center of the dialectic between economic history and the history of economic ideas. Her book describes a process of economic and cultural change in the United States, Great Britain and France that shaped the evolution of patriarchal capitalism and the welfare state.

== Selected journal articles ==
=== "The Cost of Caring" (with Paula England) (1999) ===
Care providers require a variety of skills – from nursing and physical therapy to teaching and emotional counseling. Yet, these jobs rarely offer wages commensurate with their requirements for education and skill. Folbre and England discuss the struggle for recognition of what has traditionally been viewed as "women's work", and how providing these services constitutes a public good whose beneficiaries pay almost nothing. For many who provide care, the greatest compensation comes only from the satisfaction of altruism. In the end, society is uncomfortable assigning a price to something this sacred and that this reluctance limits the pay of those who provide it.

=== "Measuring Care: Gender, Empowerment and the Care Economy" (2006) ===
A number of indices have been established to quantify women's development, health, well-being and the role that they play in their respective economies. Among these are the Gender Development Index (GDI) and the Gender Empowerment Measure (GEM) used by the United Nations Human Development Report Office and the Gender Inequality Index developed by Social Watch. In this article, Folbre explores the strengths and weaknesses of these indices and proposes new indices that take greater account of the care economy. She reflects upon specific care work activities that have measurable effects on the reproduction of labor, and discusses ways to integrate the process of care, rather than merely the outcome of care work.

In many ways, this article is also a study in methodology. In proposing new metrics, she discusses a number of hurdles that researchers face in gathering data. For example, she suggests ways to use census data related to general household spending to extrapolate information on dependency ratios. Folbre debates the use and construction of time use surveys and their relation to the valuation of care work.

=== "Children as Public Goods" (1994) ===
In this short article, Folbre argues that because present workers support the elderly, today's children are a public good needed for the future support of current adults. She asserts that the raising of children imposes costs that are not borne evenly throughout society, and that those who invest little into this public good are "free-riders".

To build her case, Folbre begins by describing the impact of economic development on the opportunity costs of having children. In a traditional patriarchal society, the social norms place serious restrictions on women's ability to make a living outside of marriage. This lowers the opportunity costs of having children and heightens the utility of children – who are often sent to work at a very young age. This typically leads to higher fertility and an unspoken pact of responsibility between parents and their children.

However, the growth of labor markets and increased geographic mobility has seen an increase in the independence of women and a weakening of patriarchal property rights. In developed countries, compulsory education and restrictions on child labor have increased the costs to parents. As a result, these parents find it easier to default on the implicit contract of family. Nevertheless, Folbre points out that people do not respond to changes in the cost of children quickly, and those that choose family life are more likely to experience economic hardship – particularly single women.

Policy makers in Europe and the United States recognized the decline of care for elderly family members and began introducing policies to fill the growing void. Folbre notes how this may have led to rent-seeking behavior among the elderly, and as a consequence, transfers from the young to the old have increased at the very time when the cost of child care is increasing. As policy focuses more heavily upon the elderly, the failure to support commitments to child care weakens the social norms that uphold the reproduction of future workers. Folbre discusses and briefly critiques solutions posed by others and concludes with a call for compensation for parents and job training for young adults.

=== "Improper Acts: Sex in Classical Political Economy" (1992) ===
In this article, Folbre discusses how the matter of sexuality was implicit in classical British political economy. Bernard Mandeville, Adam Smith, and Robert Malthus accepted conventional standards of family law and sexual morality as given, yet they underestimated the influence of rational self-interest on the practice of sexual intercourse. In some cases, they argued against its application there. Yet, at least some political economists contested prevailing social norms and religious views. Jeremy Bentham defended the legitimacy of sex as a form of recreation and protested the persecution of homosexuals, and Francis Place actively promoted contraception. These dissenters, advocates of "improper arts," deserve more recognition than they have traditionally received. By insisting that rational self-interest should rule reproduction as well as production, they expanded the scope of political economy.

=== "The Future of the Elephant Bird" (1997) ===
In this article, Folbre builds upon ideas offered by Kingsley Davis in his 1937 article "Reproductive institutions and the pressure for population." Davis laments the growing divide between the family and modern social institutions. Folbre examines the connection between social changes and John Caldwell's work on the demographic transition observed in the United States in the 1970s. She expands the discussion by noting the importance of distributional conflict within the family – how the capitalist labor market forced a change in the traditionally patriarchal family relationships. As many functions of the family, such as childcare and education, are shifted to the public sector, the role of parental authority has weakened. She notes how private and governmental retirement planning has slowly replaced intergenerational reciprocity and how employers invest in the human capital of their workers, much as parents once did.

The title of the article refers to the Dr. Seuss book Horton Hatches the Egg, in which Horton, the elephant, serves as a surrogate parent for a bird. To illustrate the main theme of her argument, Folbre uses the story of Horton as an allegory for the changing relationship between parents and children. The mother bird entrusts Horton to warm her egg while she takes an extended vacation, only to find that the egg has hatched in her absence and her chick sees Horton as it mother. While Folbre sees the departure of the mother bird as a potential moral issue, she takes issue with Davis's utilitarian view of materialist functionalism. By this view, all social institutions are evaluated in terms of costs and benefits – even to the point where investments of affection are weighed against the potential for reciprocity. She recognizes the benefits of the mother bird's increased autonomy (and perhaps the inevitability of the trend), but concludes her article with a call for collective responsibility for caring for others. By taking turns "sitting on the nest," society would embrace a moral vision that values the reproduction of labor rather than merely the fruits of labor.

=== Other publications ===
- Folbre, Nancy (July 1980). "Patriarchy in Colonial New England". Review of Radical Political Economics. 12 (2): 4–13. doi:10.1177/048661348001200202. S2CID 144804615.
- Folbre, Nancy (Spring 1991). "The unproductive housewife: her evolution in nineteenth-century economic thought". Signs. 16 (3): 463–484. doi:10.1086/494679. JSTOR 3174585. S2CID 145235346.

Also available as: Folbre, Nancy (1995), "The unproductive housewife: her evolution in nineteenth-century economic thought", in Humphries, Jane (ed.), Gender and economics, Aldershot, England Brookfield, Vermont, USA: Edward Elgar, pp. 77–98, ISBN 978-1-85278-843-8.

- Folbre, Nancy; England, Paula; Budig, Michelle (November 2002). "Wages of virtue: the relative pay of care work". Social Problems. 49 (4): 455–473. doi:10.1525/sp.2002.49.4.455.
- Folbre, Nancy; England, Paula; Bittman, Michael; Sayer, Liana; Matheson, George (July 2003). "When does gender trump money?: Bargaining and time in household work". American Journal of Sociology. 109 (1): 186–214. doi:10.1086/378341. S2CID 143271334.

== Honors ==
Nancy Folbre was selected to deliver the inaugural Ailsa McKay Lecture in 2016.

== See also ==
- List of feminist economists

Non-profit organisation positions
Preceded by Jane Humphries	President of the International Association for Feminist Economics; 2002–2003	Succeeded by Lourdes Benería
Awards
New award	Ailsa McKay Lecture; 2016	Succeeded by TBD
