= Alicia Girón =

Mexican feminist economist

- Born: Alicia Girón González

Academic work
- Discipline: Feminist economics
- Institutions: Universidad Nacional Autónoma de México (UNAM) (National Autonomous University of Mexico) and the International Association for Feminist Economics (IAFFE)

Alicia Girón González is the past president of the International Association for Feminist Economics (IAFFE), her tenure was 2014 to 2015. Girón has also served as director of Universidad Nacional Autónoma de México's (UNAM) (National Autonomous University of Mexico's) Economic Research Institute (IIEc).

Her main areas of research concentrate on gender and the impact of the financial crisis. She also focuses on the impact on women in Mexico and Latin America that stabilization programs have had since the IMF Austerity programs.

== Education ==
Girón gained her postgraduate degree in 1989 in Latin American studies from the Latin American Studies Program, Faculty of Political and Social Science, Universidad Nacional Autónoma de México (UNAM) (National Autonomous University of Mexico).

== Selected bibliography ==
=== Books ===
- Girón, Alicia; Menjívar, Rafael; Caro, Concepción (1977). Un enfoque marxista del problema inflacionario. Bogotá, Colombia: Universidad Simón Bolívar, Ediciones del Tercer Mundo.
- Girón, Alicia (1991). Cincuenta años de deuda externa. México: Instituto de Investigaciones Económicas, Universidad Nacional Autónoma de México. ISBN 9789683619174.
- Girón, Alicia; Correa, Eugenia; Ortiz, Edgar (1995). Integración financiera y TLC: retos y perspectivas. Mexico, D.F: Siglo Veintiuno Editores Instituto de Investigaciones Económicas, UNAM. ISBN 9789682319600.
- Girón, Alicia; Correa, Eugenia; Bonifaz, Alma de María Chapoy (2005). Consecuencias financieras de la globalización. México, D.F: Cámara de Diputados, LIX Legislatura, Estados Unidos Mexicanos Instituto de Investigaciones Económicas, UNAM Porrúa. ISBN 9789707015685.
- Girón, Alicia; Orlik, Noemi Levy (2005). México: los bancos que perdimos: de la desregulación a la extranjerización del sistema financiero. México: UNAM, Instituto de Investigaciones Económicas UNAM, Facultad de Economía. ISBN 9789703227556.
- Girón, Alicia; Correa, Eugenia (2006). Reforma financiera en América Latina. México, D.F: Universidad Nacional Autónoma de México CLACSO Insituto de Investigaciones Económicas, UNAM. ISBN 9789871183425.
- Girón, Alicia; Pérez, Felipe Serrano (2006). Confrontaciones monetarias: marxistas y post-keynesianos en América Latina. Buenos Aires: CLACSO. ISBN 9789871183517.
- Girón, Alicia; Correa, Eugenia (2007). Del sur hacia el norte: economía política del orden económico internacional emergente. Buenos Aires: CLACSO. ISBN 9789871183784.
- Girón, Alicia; Correa, Eugenia (2009). Economistas españoles del exilio en México. Madrid: Agencia Española de Cooperación Internacional para el Desarrollo. ISBN 9788483470954.
- Girón, Alicia, ed. (2009). Género y globalización [Gender and globalization]. Buenos Aires: CLACSO. ISBN 9789871543168. Pdf (in Spanish).
- Girón, Alicia; Correa, Eugenia; Bonifaz, Alma de María Chapoy; Fuertes Sánchez, Gustavo I (2010). Quiebras financieras y experiencias paradigmáticas. México, D.F: Universidad Nacional Autónoma de México, Instituto de Investigaciones Económicas. ISBN 9786070216312.
- Girón, Alicia, ed. (2010). Crisis económica: una perspectiva feminista desde América Latina [Economic crisis: a feminist perspective from Latin America]. Buenos Aires, Argentina: CLACSO. ISBN 9789801241546.

=== Chapters in books ===
- Girón, Alicia (2008), "Obstáculos y limitaciones en el empoderamiento de las mujeres: la experiencia del PRI", in López, Patricia Rodríguez; Marin, María Luisa González (eds.), Límites y desigualdades en el empoderamiento de las mujeres en el PAN, PRI y PRD, México, D.F: Universidad Nacional Autónoma de México Universidad Autónoma Metropolitana, Unidad Iztapalapa Consejo Nacional de Ciencia y Tecnología Instituto Nacional de las Mujeres Miguel Angel Porrúa, pp. 77–91, ISBN 9789708191142 Pdf (in Spanish).
- Girón, Alicia (2012), "Feminismo. Quiebres y zurcidos en crisis", in Carosio, Alba (ed.), Feminismo y cambio social en América Latina y el Caribe [Feminism and social change in Latin America and the Caribbean], Ciudad de Buenos Aires, Argentina: CLACSO, pp. 43–56, ISBN 9789871891078. Pdf (in Spanish).

=== Journal articles ===
- Girón, Alicia (January–April 2011). "Moneda, crédito y capital financiero". Ola Financiera (in Spanish). 8. National Autonomous University of Mexico: 89–98. Abstract. Pdf.
- Girón, Alicia; Cadena, Víctor (January–April 2012). "Cajas de ahorro, bancarización e inestabilidad financiera". Ola Financiera (in Spanish). 11. National Autonomous University of Mexico: 23–50. Abstract. Pdf.
- Girón, Alicia (September–December 2014). "El sector financiero: Diez años después del Tratado de Libre Comercio de América del Norte. ¿Qué ganamosy que perdimos?". Ola Financiera (in Spanish). 19. National Autonomous University of Mexico: 1–27. Abstract. Pdf.
- Girón, Alicia (May–August 2015). "Austeridad, democracia y financiarización: Relevancia de K. Polanyi en una economía monetaria de producción en la post-crisis". Ola Financiera (in Spanish). 21. National Autonomous University of Mexico: 15–34. Abstract. Pdf.
- Girón, Alicia (January–April 2016). "Trabajo no remunerado y reproductivo. ¿Quién debe de pagar la reproducción de la fuerza de trabajo de una nación?". Ola Financiera (in Spanish). 23. National Autonomous University of Mexico: 65–80. Abstract. Pdf.

=== Review ===
- Girón, Alicia (January–April 2009). "Review of John Maynard Keynes by Davidson, Paul (2007) in Great Thinkers in Economics Series, Palgrave, Macmillan, England". Ola Financiera (in Spanish). 2: 134–136. Pdf.

== See also ==
- Feminist economics
- List of feminist economists

Non-profit organisation positions
Preceded by Yana van der Meulen Rodgers	President of the International Association for Feminist Economics; 2014–2015	Succeeded by Şemsa Özar
