= International Association for Feminist Economics =

- Abbreviation: IAFFE
- Formation: 1992
- Type: NGO
- Legal status: Association
- Purpose: Our common cause is to further gender-aware and inclusive economic inquiry and policy analysis with the goal of enhancing the well-being of children, women, and men in local, national, and transnational communities.
- Professional title: International Association for Feminist Economics
- Region served: Members in 92 countries
- Members: 800
- President: Lee Badgett
- President-Elect: Sara Cantillon
- Managing Director: Caroline Dommen
- Main organ: Board of Directors

The International Association for Feminist Economics (IAFFE) is a non-profit international association dedicated to raising awareness and inquiry of feminist economics. It has some eight hundred members in over 90 countries. The association publishes a quarterly journal entitled Feminist Economics.

== History ==
In 1990 Diana Strassmann organized a panel named, Can feminism find a home in economics? in which a number of scholars, including Nobel Prize-winner Claudia Goldin, participated. Strassmann credits Goldin for suggesting the panel's title. Jean Shackelford and April Aerni specifically invited members of the audience to join a start-up network for economists which would be overtly feminist in outlook. In 1992 this network became the International Association for Feminist Economics (IAFFE) with Shackleford becoming the first president.

By 2003 IAFFE had more than five hundred members from over thirty countries. The association's president from 2003 to 2004 was Lourdes Benería. Shahra Razavi paid tribute to Benería in a speech at the IAFFE conference in 2012 describing Benería's work as, "not only empirically grounded and conceptually informed, but also contributing to a feminist critique that is systemic and connected to a broader critique of capitalism".

IAFFE was awarded a grant of $1.5 million in 2010 from the Swedish International Development Agency (SIDA), to continue their work, including the publication of special issues of Feminist Economics. Since then the association has gone on to number eight hundred members in over ninety countries.

Starting in 2022 the organization entered a new, increasingly dynamic phase of its existence. This builds to some extent on the paradoxical success of its 2020 Conference: due to be held in Quito in 2020, it was postponed for a year due to COVID, and then had to move entirely online when it took place in 2021. The Conference's online nature attracted a large participation and set the ground for a new and rich series of online events. Online events include introductions to key topics in Feminist Economics, such as sessions on Feminist Macroeconomics with Diane Elson and Jayati Ghosh, or on the Purple Economy with Ipek Ilkkaracan.

In 2023 IAFFE launched new activities on teaching Feminist Economics and on identifying barriers to Feminist Economics.

The Association's funders now include Co-Impact and the William and Flora Hewlett Foundation. IAFFE's Annual Conferences receive regular support from the Friedrich-Ebert-Stiftung and others.

== Conferences ==
One of IAFFE's main activities is its annual Conference. The most recent took place at the University of Massachusetts, Amherst, in July 2025. IAFFE also takes part in the Allied Social Science Associations (ASSA) annual conference every year.

#	Year	Place	Theme
1st	1992	American University, Washington DC USA	IAFFE Conference Programs
2nd	1993	American University, Washington DC USA (August); Amsterdam, the Netherlands in conjunction with "Out of the Margin" conference (June) - also organized 8 panels for the UN Conference in Beijing, China	Feminist economic inquiry.
3rd	1994	Alverno College, Milwaukee, Wisconsin USA	IAFFE Conference Programs
4th	1995	Tours, France	Feminist economic inquiry.
5th	1996	American University, Washington DC, USA	Feminist economic inquiry.
6th	1997	Taxco, Mexico	Feminist economic inquiry.
7th	1998	Amsterdam, the Netherlands	Feminist approaches to economics.
8th	1999	Carleton University, Ottawa, Canada	Feminist economic inquiry.
9th	2000	Boğaziçi University, Istanbul, Turkey	Feminist economic inquiry.
10th	2001	Holmenkollen Hotel, Oslo, Norway	Feminist economic inquiry.
11th	2002	Occidental College, California, USA	Feminist economic inquiry.
12th	2003	The Centre for Gender and Development Studies, The University of the West Indies, Barbados, West Indies	Feminist economic inquiry.
13th	2004	St Hilda's College, Oxford, England	Feminist economic inquiry.
14th	2005	Washington DC, USA	Feminist economic inquiry.
15th	2006	Sydney, Australia	Feminist economic inquiry.
16th	2007	Ramkhamhaeng University, Bangkok, Thailand	Feminist economic inquiry.
17th	2008	Torino, Italy	Women's work and education in the global economy.
18th	2009	Simmons College, Boston, MA, USA	Global economic crises impacts women differently.
19th	2010	Buenos Aires, Argentina	Global economic crises and feminist rethinking of the development discourse.
20th	2011	Zhejiang Gongshang University, Hangzhou, China	Reorienting economic theory, policies, and institutions: Feminist perspectives in the aftermath of the global economic crisis.
21st	2012	Barcelona, Spain	Human well-being for the 21st century: weaving alliances from feminist economics
22nd	2013	Stanford University, Palo Alto, California	Feminist economists’ perspectives on women's education and work across the globe
23rd	2014	University of Ghana, Accra, Ghana	Women's economic empowerment and the new global development agenda.
24th	2015	Berlin, Germany	Papers invited on the issues of: Gender, monetary and fiscal policies / Women's employment, families and austerity programs / Deflation and gender in a complex global world / Women's employment and Central Bank policies during the post-crisis period economic empowerment, ethics and gender development / Gender, microcredit and microfinance.
25th	2016	Galway, Ireland	Transitions and transformations in gender equality.
26th	2017	Sungshin University, Seoul, South Korea	Gender equalities in a multi-polar world.
27th	2018	SUNY New Paltz, New Platz, NY USA	Feminist debates on migration, inequalities and resistance.
28th	2019	Glasgow Caledonian University, Glasgow, Scotland	Theme: tbc.
29th	2020	FLACSO Ecuador, Quito, Ecuador	Cancelled due to COVID.
29th	2021	FLACSO Ecuador, Quito, Ecuador	Online only.
30th	2022	Graduate Institute, Geneva, Switzerland	Transforming global governance for social justice: Feminist economics and the fight for human rights
31st	2023	ACEIR, Cape Town, South Africa	Envisioning Feminist Economics Strategies for an Equitable and Sustainable World
32nd	2024	Sapienza, Rome, Italy	Caught Between the Digital Revolution and a Crisis of Democracy: Feminist Economics Responses and Imaginations for the Future
33rd	2025	University of Massachusetts, Amherst, USA	Theme to be determined

== Grants ==
Year	Awarding body / organization	Amount	Purpose of grant
2010	Swedish International Development Agency (SIDA)	$1,500,000 US	IAFFE work and special issues of Feminist Economics.
2011	Ford Foundation	$250,000 US	In support of a project on "Land, Gender, and Food Security".
2014	Routledge and Taylor & Francis	$1,500 US	The Rhonda Williams Prize (see above).
2022	Co-Impact Gender Fund	approx $1 million US	Building a Transformative Feminist Economics and Feminist Leadership to Shape the Future of Economics

== The Rhonda Williams Prize ==
IAFFE offer a prize scholarship in memory of former associate editor of Feminist Economics (1994–1998), Rhonda Williams. In 2014 the amount awarded was $1,500 to be given out at their summer conference to allow underrepresented groups in IAFFE attend the conference and present a paper. Award winners must demonstrate a commitment to one or more of the following issues: inequalities; interrelationships (racism, sexism, homophobia, and classism); and connections between scholarship and activism. Funding is provided by both Routledge and, Taylor & Francis. IAFFE also offers other prizes for published works or service to Feminist Economics.

== Association members ==
=== 2020-21 Board of Directors ===
This is list of who is sitting on the board of IAFFE.

- President - Lee Badgett
- President-Elect - Sara Cantillon
- Executive Vice President and Treasurer - Shaianne Osterreich
- Executive Vice President and Secretary - Lynda Pickbourn
- Editor, Feminist Economics - Elissa Braunstein
- Past President - Cheryl Doss

==== Additional board members ====
- Valeria Esquivel
- Rebeca Gomez Betancourt
- Lynda Pickbourn
- Caroline Shenaz Hossein
- Sheba Tejani
- Marcella Corsi
- Heidi Hartmann
- Fatimah Kelleher

=== Past presidents ===
This is a list of presidents of the IAFFE.

- 1993–1995 Jean Shackelford
- 1995–1997 Marianne Ferber
- 1997–1999 Myra Strober
- 1999–2000 Barbara Bergmann
- 2000–2001 Rhonda Sharp
- 2001–2002 Jane Humphries
- 2002–2003 Nancy Folbre
- 2003–2004 Lourdes Benería
- 2004–2005 Bina Agarwal
- 2005–2006 Robin L. Bartlett
- 2006–2007 Edith Kuiper
- 2007–2008 Martha MacDonald
- 2008–2009 Cecilia Conrad
- 2009–2009 Susan Himmelweit
- 2009–2010 Eudine Barriteau
- 2010–2011 Stephanie Seguino
- 2011–2012 Rosalba Todaro
- 2012–2013 Agneta Stark
- 2013–2014 Yana van der Meulen Rodgers
- 2014–2015 Alicia Girón
- 2015–2016 Şemsa Özar
- 2016–2017 Joyce Jacobsen
- 2018–2019 Naila Kabeer
- 2019–2020 Cheryl Doss
- 2020–2021 Radhika Balakrishnan
- 2021–2022 Abena Oduro
- 2022–2023 Ipek Ilkkaracan
- 2023–2024 Lee Badgett

== Publications ==
=== Journals ===
- Feminist Economics.

=== Books by IAFFE members ===
- Bahramitash, Roksana (2013). Gender and entrepreneurship in Iran: microenterprise and the informal sector. New York, NY: Palgrave Macmillan. ISBN 9781137342867.
- Bettio, Francesca; Plantenga, Janneke; Smith, Mark (2013). Gender and the European labour market. London New York: Routledge. ISBN 9780415664332.
- Bjørnholt, Margunn; McKay, Ailsa (2014). Counting on Marilyn Waring: new advances in feminist economics. Bradford, Ontario: Demeter Press. ISBN 9781927335277.
- Blau, Francine D; Ferber, Marianne A; Winkler, Anne E (2014). The economics of women, men, and work (seventh ed.). Boston: Pearson. ISBN 9780132992817.
- Deshpande, Ashwini (2013). Affirmative action in India. New Delhi Oxford: Oxford University Press. ISBN 9780198092087.
- Dokmanović, Mirjana; Kuzmanović, Tatjana Đ. (2012). Guidelines for introducing gender budgeting at national level in the Republic of Serbia (in Serbian). Serbia: Gender Equality Directorate, Ministry of Labor, Employment and Social Policy. ISBN 9780132992817.
- Figart, Deborah M.; Warnecke, Tonia L. (2013). Handbook of research on gender and economic life. Cheltenham: Edward Elgar. ISBN 9780857930941.
- Gornick, Janet C.; Jäntti, Markus (2013). Income inequality: economic disparities and the middle class in affluent countries. Stanford, California: Stanford University Press. ISBN 9780804778244.
- Kabeer, Naila; Sudarshan, Ratna; Milward, Kirsty (2013). Organizing women workers in the informal economy: beyond the weapons of the weak. London New York: Zed Books. ISBN 9781780324517.
- Kalabikhina, Irina (2012). Economic and demographic development: gender transition - theory, indexes, prediction, policy. (in Russian). Russia: LAB Lambert Academic Publishing.
- Karamessini, Maria; Rubery, Jill (2014). Women and austerity: the economic crisis and the future for gender equality. Milton Park, Abingdon, Oxon: Routledge. ISBN 9780415815376.
- Mejiuni, Olutoyin (2013). Women and power: education, religion and identity. Dakar: CODESRIA. ISBN 9782869785731.
- Mills, Julie; Franzway, Suzanne; Gill, Judy; Sharp, Rhonda (2013). Challenging knowledge, sex and power: gender, work and engineering. New York: Routledge, IAFFE Book Series. ISBN 9780415676861.
- Tanaka, Shigeto (2013). A Quantitative Picture of Contemporary Japanese Families: Tradition and Modernity in the 21st Century. Sendai: Tohoku University Press. ISBN 9784861632266.

== See also ==
- American Economic Association (AEA)
- Capability approach
- Critique of political economy
- Equality of autonomy
- European Association for Evolutionary Political Economy (EAEPE)
- Feminist economics - the subject
- Feminist Economics - the journal
- Human Development and Capability Association
- International Development Research Centre
