= Lee Badgett =

American economist

- Born: 1960 (age 65–66); North Carolina, US
- Other name: Mary Virginia Lee Badgett

Academic background
- Education: University of Chicago; University of California, Berkeley
- Thesis: Racial Differences in Unemployment Rates and Employment Opportunities (1990)

Academic work
- Discipline: Economics
- Institutions: University of Maryland, College Park; University of Massachusetts, Amherst
- Main interests: Economics of sexual orientation; labor economics
- Website: leebadgett.com

The United States and the Netherlands launched on February 12 a call to action urging the Organization for Economic Cooperation and Development to include Lesbian, Gay, Bisexual, and Transgender (LGBT) issues in its ongoing and future work on economic inclusiveness. The call to action prevailed on the OECD to examine the economic case for LGBT-inclusivity and to develop recommendations for policymakers to remove barriers to equal LGBT treatment in the workplace.

Mary Virginia Lee Badgett (born 1960) is an American economist at the University of Massachusetts Amherst, best known for her research into economic issues relevant to lesbians, gay men, and their families.

Badgett earned a Bachelor of Arts degree in economics from the University of Chicago in 1982 and a Doctor of Philosophy degree in economics from the University of California, Berkeley in 1990. From 1990 to 1997 she was on the faculty at the University of Maryland, College Park, and in 1997 she joined the University of Massachusetts, Amherst. Since 2005, Badgett has also been the research director at the UCLA Williams Institute.

Badgett's research has debunked the myth that gay and lesbian Americans are more affluent than straight people. She has also documented the effects on taxation of government recognition of same-sex marriage, showing in 2007 that same-sex couples pay on average more than $1,000 annually than similarly situated opposite-sex couples whose marriage is recognized. This research has been cited by numerous companies and institutions that have altered their employee compensation and benefits to try to remedy the disparity. Badgett has testified as an expert witness before Congress and other legislatures, and in various litigations regarding same-sex marriage, including the Proposition 8 trial.

== Bibliography ==
- The Economic Case for LGBT Equality: Why Fair and Equal Treatment Benefits Us All (Beacon Press, 2020)
- The Public Professor: How to Use Your Research to Change the World (NYU Press, 2015)
- When Gay People Get Married: What Happens When Societies Legalize Same-Sex Marriage (NYU Press, 2009)
- Co-Editor, Sexual Orientation Discrimination: An International Perspective (Routledge, 2007)
- Money, Myths, and Change: The Economic Lives of Lesbians and Gay Men (University of Chicago Press, 2001)
