= Jane Humphries =

British historian

Jane Humphries CBE
- Born: Katherine Jane Humphries; 9 November 1948 (age 77)

Academic background
- Education: Cornell University
- Thesis: The role of the manufacturing sector in economic development (1973)

Academic work
- Institutions: All Souls College, University of Oxford
- Main interests: Economic history
- Website: http://www.history.ox.ac.uk/people/professor-jane-humphries

Katherine Jane Humphries, CBE FBA (born 9 November 1948), is a Fellow of All Souls College, University of Oxford with the Title of Distinction of professor of economic history. Her research interest has been in economic growth and development and the industrial revolution. She is the former president of the Economic History Society and the current vice-president of the Economic History Association.

== Early life ==
Humphries gained her economics degree from Newnham College, Cambridge, in 1970; she went on to Cornell University to do both her masters and then her doctorate which she completed in 1973.

== Career ==
Her professional life began at University of Massachusetts Amherst, first as an assistant professor (1973–1979), then as an associate professor (1979–1980). She was lecturer at the University of Cambridge and later a fellow of Newnham College (1980–1995). In 1993, during her period at Newnham College, Humphries was a visiting fellow at the Centre for Population and Development within Harvard University's School of Public Health.

Humphries returned to Newnham College as reader in economics and economic history in 1995, she then took up a post as reader in economic history and fellow at All Souls College, University of Oxford in 1998. In 2004, she was awarded a Title of Distinction as professor of economic history at All Souls. In 2012, Humphries was elected a Fellow of the British Academy (FBA), the United Kingdom's national academy for the humanities and social sciences. After retiring from Oxford, she became Centennial Professor of Economic History at the London School of Economics in 2018.

== Edited journals ==
Humphries has sat on the editorial boards of a number of peer-reviewed journals. She is currently on the editorial boards of Gender, Work and Organization, and Feminist Economics.

== Honours ==
On 29 January 2016 Humphries received an honorary doctorate from the Faculty of Educational Sciences at Uppsala University, Sweden. In 2018 she received an honorary doctorate from Sheffield University. Her 2019 article 'Unreal Wages? Real Income and Economic Growth in England, 1260-1850', co-authored with Jacob Weisdorf, was awarded the 2019 Royal Economic Society Prize.

== Selected bibliography ==
=== Books ===
- Humphries, Katherine Jane (1973). The role of the manufacturing sector in economic development (Ph.D thesis). Cornell University. OCLC 64678496.
- Humphries, Jane (1995). Gender and economics. Aldershot, England: Brookfield, Vermont, USA Edward Elgar. ISBN 9781852788438.
- Humphries, Jane; Rubery, Jill (1995). The economics of equal opportunities. Manchester, England: Equal Opportunities Commission. ISBN 978-1870358477.
- Humphries, Jane; Robeyns, Ingrid; Agarwal, Bina (2005). Amartya Sen's work and ideas: a gender perspective. London New York: Routledge. ISBN 9780415373203.
- Humphries, Jane; Albelda, Randy P; Himmelweit, Susan (2005). Dilemmas of lone motherhood. London New York: Routledge. ISBN 9780415360180.
- Humphries, Jane (2010). Childhood and child labour in the British Industrial Revolution. Cambridge, UK New York: Cambridge University Press. ISBN 9780521847568.
- Humphries, Jane; Floud, Roderick; Johnson, Paul (2014). Cambridge economic history of modern Britain: 1870 to the present (2nd ed.). Cambridge New York: Cambridge University Press. ISBN 9781107686731.

=== Chapters in books ===
- Humphries, Jane; McNay, Kirsty (2009), "Death and gender in Victorian England", in Kanbur, Ravi; Basu, Kaushik (eds.), Arguments for a better world: essays in honor of Amartya Sen | Volume II: Society, institutions and development, Oxford New York: Oxford University Press, pp. 259–279, ISBN 9780199239979.

=== Journal articles ===
- Humphries, Jane (July 1980). "An open letter to the RRPE special issue on women collective". Review of Radical Political Economics. 12 (2): 94. doi:10.1177/048661348001200211. S2CID 154815417.
- Humphries, Jane; Rubery, Jill (December 1984). "The reconstruction of the supply side of the labour market: the relative autonomy of social reproduction". Cambridge Journal of Economics. 8 (4): 331–346. doi:10.1093/oxfordjournals.cje.a035554.
- Humphries, Jane (March 1990). "Enclosures, common rights and women: the proletarianization of families in late eighteenth and early nineteenth century Britain". The Journal of Economic History. 50 (1): 17–42. doi:10.1017/S0022050700035701. S2CID 155042395.
- Humphries, Jane (1991). ""Lurking in the Wings...": Women in the Historiography of the Industrial Revolution". History. 20 (1): 32–44. JSTOR 23702799.
- Humphries, Jane; Horrell, Sara; Weale, Martin (August 1994). "An input-output table for 1841". The Economic History Review. 47 (3): 545–566. doi:10.1111/j.1468-0289.1994.tb01390.x.
- Humphries, Jane; Horrell, Sara; Voth, Hans-Joachim (July 2001). "Destined for deprivation: human capital formation and intergenerational poverty in nineteenth-century England". Explorations in Economic History. 38 (3): 339–365. doi:10.1006/exeh.2000.0765. PMID 18524044.
- Humphries, Jane (July 2001). "Child labor: lessons from the historical experience of today's industrial economies". The World Bank Economic Review. 17 (2): 175–196. doi:10.1093/wber/lhg016. hdl:10986/17178. S2CID 16712334.
- Humphries, Jane; Robeyns, Ingrid; Agarwal, Bina (January 2003). "Exploring the challenges of Amartya Sen's work and ideas: an introduction". Feminist Economics. 9 (2–3): 3–12. doi:10.1080/1354570032000099039. S2CID 51098991.
- Humphries, Jane; Robeyns, Ingrid; Agarwal, Bina (January 2003). "Continuing the conversation". Feminist Economics. 9 (2–3): 319–332. doi:10.1080/1354570032000089788. S2CID 153917523.
- Humphries, Jane; Himmelweit, Susan F.; Albelda, Randy P. (July 2004). "The dilemmas of lone motherhood: key issues for feminist economics". Feminist Economics. 10 (2): 1–7. doi:10.1080/1354570042000217694. S2CID 154585874.
- Humphries, Jane; Jacobsen, Joyce P.; Robb, Robert Edgecombe; Burton, Jonathan; Blackaby, David H.; Joshi, Heather; Wang, Xiaobo; Dong, Xiao-yuan (July 2006). "Explorations: The Status of Women Economists". Feminist Economics. 12 (3): 427–474. doi:10.1080/13545700600669667. S2CID 154406329.
- Humphries, Jane; Sarasúa, Carmen (October 2012). "Off the record: Reconstructing women's labor force participation in the European past". Feminist Economics. 18 (4): 39–67. doi:10.1080/13545701.2012.746465. S2CID 153742758.
- Humphries, Jane; Weisdorf, Jacob (June 2015). "The Wages of Women in England, 1260–1850". Journal of Economic History. 75 (2): 405-447. https://doi.org/10.1017/S0022050715000662
- Humphries, Jane; Weisdorf, Jacob (May 2019). "Unreal Wages? Real Income and Economic Growth in England, 1260-1850". Economic Journal. 129 (623), 2867-2887. https://doi.org/10.1093/ej/uez017

== See also ==
- Feminist economics
- List of feminist economists

Non-profit organisation positions
Preceded by Rhonda Sharp	President of the International Association for Feminist Economics; 2001–2002	Succeeded by Nancy Folbre
