= Bina Agarwal =

Indian development economist

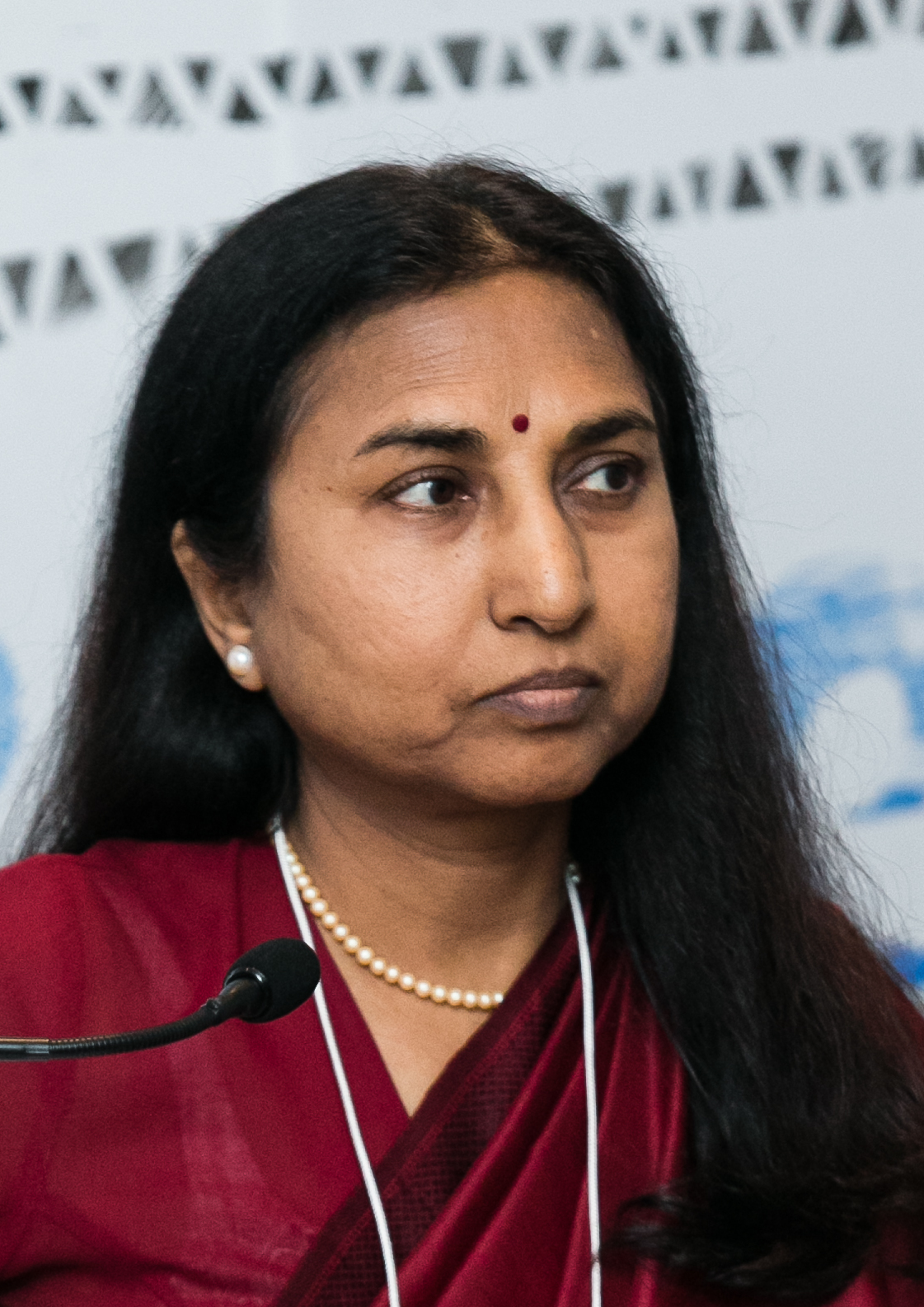
- Agarwal in 2012

Academic background
- Education: University of Cambridge (B.A., M.A.); University of Delhi (PhD)

Academic work
- Discipline: Development economics
- Awards: Ananda Kentish Coomaraswamy Book Prize 1996, Edgar Graham Book Prize 1996, The K. H. Batheja Award 1995–96, Leontief Prize 2010, ISEE Kenneth Boulding Award for Ecological Economics 2023

Notes
- Thesis Mechanization in Indian agriculture: an analytical study based on the Punjab. (1977)

Bina Agarwal is an Indian development economist and Professor of Development Economics and Environment at the Global Development Institute at The University of Manchester. She has written extensively on land, livelihoods and property rights; environment and development; the political economy of gender; poverty and inequality; legal change; and agriculture and technological transformation.

She is the author of a book, A Field of One's Own: Gender and Land Rights in South Asia, which has had an impact on governments, NGOs, and international agencies in promoting women's rights in land and property. This work has also inspired research in Latin America and globally.

== Early life and education ==
Agarwal's parents were Suraj Mal and Shyama Devi Agarwal, Agarwal named a book prize in their honour. She earned her B.A. and M.A. from the University of Cambridge, and her doctorate in economics from the Delhi School of Economics, University of Delhi, her dissertation was Mechanization in Indian Agriculture: An Analytical Study Based on the Punjab.

== Career ==
Her university positions include posts at Princeton, Harvard University, University of Michigan, University of Minnesota, and New York University. At Harvard, she was the first Daniel Ingalls Visiting Professor Agarwal has also been President of the International Society for Ecological Economics. Vice-president of the International Economic Association, President of the International Association for Feminist Economics, on the Board of the Global Development Network, and one of the twenty-one members of the Commission on the Measurement of Economic Performance and Social Progress, chaired by Nobel Laureate Joseph Stiglitz. She has served on the UN Committee for Development Policy (New York) and UNRISD (Geneva). She holds honorary doctorates from the Institute of Social Studies in the Netherlands and the University of Antwerp in Belgium.

Agarwal's expertise is on subjects related to rural economy. She has creatively used diverse methodologies (from econometric analysis to qualitative assessments) and an interdisciplinary approach, to provide insights on land, livelihoods and property rights; environment and development; the political economy of gender; poverty and inequality; law; and agriculture and technological change. She deals especially with the connectedness of gender inequality, social exclusion, property, and development. Her pioneering work has had an impact globally both within the academia and among policy makers and practitioners. A large part of her work compares countries, especially within South Asia. In A Field of One's Own (Cambridge University Press, 1994), her most famous work, Agarwal stresses that "the single most important factor affecting women's situation is the gender gap in command over property." She is also on the editorial board of the Journal of Women, Politics & Policy.

Spurred on by Agarwal's work, and the successful movement she led in 2004–2005, Indian policy makers passed the Hindu Succession (Amendment) Act in 2005. This Act gives all Hindu women (married and unmarried) equal rights with men in the ownership and inheritance of property, in particular agricultural land.

Agarwal has consistently challenged standard economic analysis and assumptions. In her writings on the "bargaining approach" to intra-family relations, she challenges unitary household models and extends formal bargaining models to highlight the importance of social norms, social perceptions and property ownership in determining women's bargaining power. She also demonstrates the interconnectedness of the family, the community, the market and the state in determining a person's bargaining power in any one sphere. Her paper "Bargaining and Gender Relations" is the single most downloaded paper to date in the journal Feminist Economics. In another article "Bargaining and Legal Change", Agarwal examines how women in India were able to bargain with the State to pass the inheritance laws of 1956 and bring about its amendment in 2005.

In another important extension of her work on gender, property and power, Agarwal demonstrates in her empirically rigours article "Towards Freedom from Domestic Violence", that women's ability to own and inherit land acts as a significant deterrent against marital violence. Her recent books include: Psychology, Rationality and Economic Behaviour (coedited; Palgrave, 2005), Capabilities, Freedom and Equality (co-edited, Oxford University Press, Delhi, 2006). Her most recently authored book is Gender and Green Governance (Oxford University Press, Oxford and Delhi, 2010) which has been widely cited and favourably reviewed in both academic journals and the popular press (EPW and Indian Express).

== Positions and awards ==
Bina Agarwal has held positions at Harvard University, where she was the first Daniel Ingalls Visiting professor, the University of Michigan in Ann Arbor, Michigan, the University of Minnesota, where she held the Winton Chair, and the New York University School of Law. In 2006–07, Agarwal was also a visiting research fellow at Harvard Kennedy School at Harvard University. In addition, she has been vice-president of the International Economic Association, president of the International Association for Feminist Economics, and on the board of the Global Development Network. Agarwal is a founding member of the Indian Society for Ecological economics. She is one of only two women who served on the Commission for the Measurement of Economic Performance and Social Progress. She has also been consultant to the Planning Commission of India.

In 2009, Agarwal was nominated to the board of the United Nations Research Institute for Social Development (UNRISD). On 29 March 2010 the Global Development and Environment Institute (GDAE) awarded her the 2010 Leontief Prize. She is the currently president-elect of the International Society for Ecological Economics. She also heads a "Working Group on Disadvantaged Farmers, including Women" for India's 12th Five Year Plan, and is on the Indian Prime Minister's Panel on Land Reform. Additionally, Agarwal is on the advisory board for Academics Stand Against Poverty (ASAP).

In 2017, she received the Balzan Prize for Gender Studies in recognition of her work in studying women's contribution to agriculture in India.

== Additional honours ==
- Malcolm Adiseshiah Award 2002 for Distinguished Contributions to Development Studies.
- Ananda Kentish Coomaraswamy Book Prize 1996, given by the Association for Asian Studies (USA) (First South Asian to win the prize.)
- Edgar Graham Book Prize 1996, given every two years by The University of London's the Department of Development Studies, School of Oriental and African Studies.
- The K. H. Batheja Award 1995–96 given every two years by Bombay University and the Batheja Trust awarding the most deserving works about India and Development.
- Padma Shri awarded by the President of India in 2008

== Selected works ==
- Agarwal, Bina (1976). Monsoon poems. USA: Ind-U. S. Incorporated. ISBN 9780892538089.
- Agarwal, Bina (1986). Mechanization in Indian agriculture: an analytical study based on the Punjab. New Delhi u.a: Allied Publishing. ISBN 9788170230793.
- Agarwal, Bina (1986). Cold hearths and barren slopes: the woodfuel crisis in the Third World. New Delhi: Allied Publishers. ISBN 9788170230076.
- Agarwal, Bina; Afshar, Haleh (1989). Women, poverty and ideology in Asia: contradictory pressures, uneasy resolutions. Houndmills, Basingstoke, Hampshire England: Macmillan. ISBN 9780333444092.
- Agarwal, Bina (1994). A field of one's own: gender and land rights in South Asia. Cambridge England New York, NY, USA: Cambridge University Press. ISBN 9780521429269.
- Agarwal, Bina (1988). Structures of patriarchy: state, community, and household in modernising Asia. New Delhi: Kali for Women. ISBN 9788185107066.
- Agarwal, Bina; Vercelli, Alessandro (2005). Psychology, rationality, and economic behaviour: challenging standard assumptions. Houndmills, Basingstoke, Hampshire New York: Palgrave Macmillan in association with International Economic Association. ISBN 9781403942531.
- Agarwal, Bina (2007). Capabilities, freedom, and equality: Amartya Sen's work from a gender perspective. New Delhi New York: Oxford University Press. ISBN 9780195692372.
- Agarwal, Bina (2010). Gender and green governance: the political economy of women's presence within and beyond community forestry. Oxford England New York USA: Oxford University Press. ISBN 9780191614309.

== See also ==
- Feminist economics
- List of feminist economists

Non-profit organisation positions
Preceded by Lourdes Benería	President of the International Association for Feminist Economics; 2004–2005	Succeeded by Robin Bartlett
