= Feminist Economics (journal) =

- Discipline: Feminist economics
- Language: English
- Edited by: Elissa Braunstein

Publication details
- History: 1994–present
- Publisher: Routledge
- Frequency: Quarterly
- Impact factor: 2.0 (2024)

Standard abbreviations
- ISO 4: Fem. Econ.

Indexing
- ISSN: 1354-5701
- LCCN: 99111832
- OCLC no.: 32729633

Links
- Journal homepage; Online access

Feminist Economics is a peer-reviewed academic journal published by Routledge and the International Association for Feminist Economics (IAFFE) in the field of feminist economics.

According to the Journal Citation Reports, the journal had a Journal Impact Factor of 2.0 and a 5-year impact factor of 3.8 in 2024. This places it 13th out of 70 journals (Q1) in Women's Studies and 212th out of 617 journals (Q2) in Economics.

== History ==
Feminist Economics was founded in 1994 by Diana Strassman on behalf of the International Association for Feminist Economics (IAFFE). The first issue was published in 1995. Feminist Economics was voted as the "Best New Journal" by the Council of Editors of Learned Journals in 1997.

Founding Editor Diana Strassman (Rice University) was joined by Editor Günseli Berik (University of Utah) in 2010, who served until 2017. Elissa Braunstein (Colorado State University) became Co-Editor of Feminist Economics in 2017, taking over as Editor in 2020.

== See also ==
- List of women's studies journals
