= Against the Grain: A Deep History of the Earliest States =

2017 book by James C. Scott

- First edition
- Author: James C. Scott
- Language: English
- Genre: World history
- Publisher: Yale University Press
- Publication date: 19 September 2017
- Publication place: United States
- Media type: Print:hardback
- Pages: 312
- ISBN: 9780300182910
- Dewey Decimal: 909
- LC Class: GN799.A4 S285
- Website: yalebooks

Against the Grain: A Deep History of the Earliest States is a 2017 book by James C. Scott that sets out to undermine what he calls the "standard civilizational narrative" that suggests humans chose to live settled lives based on intensive agriculture because this made people safer and more prosperous. Instead, he argues, people had to be forced to live in the early states, which were hierarchical, beset by malnutrition and disease, and often based on slavery. The book has been praised for re-opening some of the biggest questions in human history. A review in Science concludes that the book's thesis "is fascinating and represents an alternative, nuanced, if somewhat speculative, scenario on how civilized society came into being."

== Background ==
Scott is among the world's most cited political scientists. He spent much of his career studying South-East Asia, and producing books such as The Art of Not Being Governed and Seeing Like a State. He has long been a critic of state power, having previously written on the subject of anarchism in works such as Two Cheers for Anarchism. Against the Grain returns to pre-history and discusses the conditions under which the first people stopped living as hunter-gatherers and moved to live in permanent settlements based on agriculture and administered by an elite. Scott challenges the conventional narrative that this change was welcome and voluntary for most participants.

== Synopsis ==
=== Chapter 1. The Domestication of Fire, Plants, Animals, and… Us ===
Scott describes the gradual process by which early humans transformed their environment. He begins by recounting the impact of mankind's use of fire, calling it "a species monopoly and a trump card" and detailing its desirability for its capacity to reduce the radius of a meal by concentrating foodstuffs in a smaller area around human encampments. Scott describes the beginnings of sedentism in wetlands prior to the cultivation of cereal grains. He then tackles the 4,000-year "gap" between the cultivation of domesticated grains and the emergence of agricultural societies, claiming that it was in the best interests of early people to supplement their existing diets with cereal grains and other domesticated crops rather than to rely upon crops exclusively. He regards adaptability in subsistence strategies as a better option than early agriculture for ancestral humans.

=== Chapter 2. Landscaping the World: The Domus Complex ===
Scott's point in this chapter is that humans domesticated the planet more extensively than simply taming cattle and planting crops, and that this had deep consequences. He examines the changes that mankind has brought to its environment by employing artificial selection to develop plant types that are now unrecognizable from their progenitors and are also unable to survive without human care. People also domesticated animals by casting out those with undesired characteristics and cultivating that which pleases us. This changed animals both in behavior and physiologically, making them permanently docile and un-reactive, while also developing smaller brains. These changes have negative effects upon the animals themselves, though they do result in a positive effect in output for their domesticators.

Scott then turns to what he calls "Human Parallels" – ways in which human beings themselves might have been transformed by domestication. From the altered bone-structures of women who were forced into agricultural labor to general size-difference and proof of nutrition-deficits in post-agriculture mankind, Scott argues that humans have bred their own irreversible change. Scott speculates that we may ourselves have become more docile and less aware of our surroundings. He also argues that the needs of domesticated plants and animals almost make us slaves to their meticulously specific and daily needs.

=== Chapter 3. Zoonoses: A Perfect Epidemiological Storm ===
In this chapter, Scott emphasizes the idea of Agro-Pastoralism, i.e. "plowed fields and domestic animals". He questions why a hunter-gatherer, who (he believes) had a relatively good and fulfilling life, would turn to this. Subsistence farming is mundane and contains more drudgery than the hunter and gatherer societies. Scott then asserts that the reason why hunter-gatherer societies transformed into agro-pastoral societies was due to coercion by the state. He cites research on an archaeological site in Mesopotamia named Abu Hureyra. Scott concurs with other scholars in the field that "'[n]o hunter-gatherers occupying a productive locality with a range of wild foods able to provide for all seasons are likely to have started cultivating their caloric staples willingly.'" Finally, Scott also points out that early states were beset by zoonoses, i.e. diseases spread from animals to humans, that result in high morbidity rates.

=== Chapter 4. Agro-Ecology of the Early State ===
Scott explains in this chapter that many apparent achievements attributed by traditional scholars to the state were actually present before state formation. Scott states: "If civilization is judged an achievement of the state, and if archaic civilization means sedentism, farming, the domus, irrigation, and towns, then there is something radically wrong with the historical order. All of these human achievements of the Neolithic were in place well before we encounter anything like a state in Mesopotamia." Scott then gives his definition of a state, emphasizing the indicators "that point to territoriality and a specialized state apparatus: walls, tax collection, and officials." The Sumerian city of Uruk offers an example. Scott cites that in Uruk, early agriculture required a very difficult lifestyle. Many people had to be forced by the state to do hard labor, for instance, digging irrigation channels. As a result of this, warfare between rival polities was very prevalent during this period in order to gain slave labor or to take over areas that had already been irrigated.

Scott goes so far as to claim that "Grains Make States". The introduction of a staple food-source allowed a state to heavily tax the people. Grains, especially wheat, provided the best way to assess and gather taxes. Grains like wheat or rice are more valuable per weight than other sources of food, and much easier to transport. As Scott puts it: "The key to the nexus between grains and states lies, I believe, in the fact that only the cereal grains can serve as a basis for taxation: visible, divisible, assessable, storable, transportable, and 'rationable.' Other crops - legumes, tubers, and starch plants - have some of these desirable state-adapted qualities, but none has all of these advantages." Making people pay taxes in grain forced people to shift away from other sources of food that they may have preferred.

=== Chapter 5. Population Control: Bondage and War ===
Scott describes early states as population machines. Rulers focused on the productivity and number of "domesticated" subjects. The early states had to collect people, settle them near the center of power, and force them to produce a surplus in excess of their own needs. He also notes that since early states were full of disease, population tended to fall unless people could be replaced by new slaves.

In early states this population control often took the form of forcefully settling peoples on fertile land, and then preventing them from fleeing in order to avoid bondage and labour-obligations. Scott cites the earliest legal codes as one piece of evidence, characterising them as "filled with such injunctions" intended to "discourage and punish flight". One code that Scott cites specifically, the Code of Hammurabi, contains six laws intended to discourage the flight and escape of slaves.

The end product of this system was that the states with the most people were often the most powerful. This created compelling incentives for early states to try to increase their population and to prevent the "leakage" of the population through bondage and war.

=== Chapter 6. Fragility of the Early State: Collapse as Disassembly ===
Scott sees early states as liable to undermine the conditions for their own existence. Self-inflicted causes of this vulnerability included "climate change, resource depletion, disease, warfare, and migration to areas of greater abundance." For instance, a state might log areas upstream so that timber could float down to the state center, but this could lead to flooding in the spring. The very first state-builders knew no prior examples that would have warned against such problems. Regardless of the causes, Scott propounds that the archaeological evidence suggests that early human communities were constantly collapsing, dispersing, coming back together and collapsing again. Scott believes that academics have viewed state collapse negatively due to the loss of cultural complexity, but in fact he thinks such collapse may have advantaged the majority of people involved. Building on his critique of the state from earlier chapters, Scott asserts that living in early states meant subjection to large-scale warfare and to slavery, and that the historical periods following state collapse may have brought a higher standard of living, and freedom. To support this view, he highlights how state collapse led to a dispersion of the population, resulting in easier access to food as well as freedom from the brutality of the state and from the need to produce a surplus to sustain the elite.

=== Chapter 7. The Golden Age of the Barbarians ===
Scott views "barbarian" raiders as having a symbiotic relationship with the early states. They raided the grain centers, but also traded many goods – such as metals or animal parts – from more remote areas. Scott thus theorizes that up until 400 or so years ago humanity was in the "Golden Age of the Barbarians" – an era when the majority of the world's population had never seen a tax collector. Part of this was due to the existence of "Barbarian Zones", i.e. great tracts of land where states found it either impossible or prohibitively difficult to extend their rule. Places like "mountains and steppes", as well as "uncleared dense forest, swamps, marshes, river deltas, fens, moors, deserts, heath, arid wastes, and even the sea itself." Not only did this place a great many people out of the reach of the state, but it also made them significant military threats to the state's power.

The traditional narrative recounts that some "barbarian" communities became sedentary and then developed into early states and civilization. Meanwhile, those who did not undergo this transition remained "barbarian". Scott argues that the history of "barbarians" and the state is much more fluid, that in fact some people "reverted" back to being barbarians precisely because of the failure and excesses of the state. This implies that civilization and state-making was not the inexorable march of progress but rather a brutal project that people avoided when possible.

== Reception ==
Multiple outlets have reviewed Against the Grain. Scott himself writes that history is "the most subversive discipline" and archaeologist Barry Cunliffe describes this book as "history as it should be written." Steven Mithen writes that Scott's "account of the deep past doesn't purport to be definitive, but it is surely more accurate than the one we're used to, and it implicitly exposes the flaws in contemporary political ideas that ultimately rest on a narrative of human progress and on the ideal of the city/nation-state."

Samuel Moyn offers a mixed review. Moyn notes that Scott's work has appealed to many critics of the status quo, from the Marxist left to the libertarian right. Moyn praises Scott and calls the book "sparkling" but wonders whether Scott is judging the state by standards that make sense to modern residents of stable states, but would confuse the hunter-gatherers whose passing Scott seems to mourn. Moyn writes: "That Scott presents as his major finding that eons separated the development of cultivation and the rise of the state not only cuts against any conclusion that the pathways into state bondage were inevitable; it also goes far to undermine Scott's entire outlook." Moyn asserts that Scott's worldview prevents him from seeing the benefits of the state, or the state's ability to change under democratic pressure. Moyn thinks that we owe the ideals Scott uses to harshly judge the early state—ideals like equality and liberty—to the stability and prosperity that states make possible. Moyn also thinks Scott fails to back up some of the core claims in the book, e.g. "Scott's vague suggestions of the 'egalitarianism' of nonstate peoples—and especially, in his new book, of our hunting-and-gathering ancestors—are never seriously defended."

Writing in the libertarian Cato Journal, Jason Kuznicki notes that Scott's "highly unconventional" account "probably resonates with a certain strain of libertarian, even as it infuriates many others." Kuznicki cautions that this should not be taken to imply that current-day agriculture is bad: "But our belief that agriculture in the present day is a blessing to humankind, which undoubtedly it is, does not commit us to insisting that agriculture, in all its forms, in all times and places, has always been a boon to everyone. Nor does the view that agriculture began as a curse commit us to believing that agriculture remains a curse today. Reality is allowed to be complex like that." Overall Kuznicki thinks the book raises questions that are still of great importance, concluding that "the constant interplay between the present and the distant past is one of the most appealing aspects of this book."

Writing in the journal Public Choice, Ennio Piano asserts that Against the Grain will reinforce Scott's reputation as a leading scholar of stateless societies. Piano sees links not only to the disciplines of history and anthropology, but also to economics, especially debates over the extent of coercion involved in creating economic systems.

== Bibliography ==
- Scott, James C (2017). Against the grain: a deep history of the earliest states. New Haven: Yale University Press. ISBN 978-0-300-18291-0.
