= The Rational Peasant: The Political Economy of Rural Society in Vietnam =

1979 book by the University of California

- Author: Samuel L. Popkin
- Language: English
- Genre: Political Science
- Published: 1979
- Publisher: University of California Press
- Publication place: United States
- Pages: 332
- ISBN: 9780520039544

The Rational Peasant: The Political Economy of Rural Society in Vietnam is a non-fiction book by University of California, San Diego political scientist Samuel L. Popkin. Originally conceived to be a reflection on the Vietnam Revolution, the book introduces the term "political economy" as a new theory of peasant behavior. Popkin surveys the precolonial, colonial, and revolutionary history of Vietnam seeking to understand the impact of outside shocks on peasant communities, and ultimately what led them to rebel.

This book is a direct rebuttal of the moral economy school, led by Political Scientist James C. Scott and more particularly his book The Moral Economy of the Peasant. Popkin's political economy approach holds that peasants are rational, self-interested agents that act to maximize their own benefit. While the moral economy approach argues that emotions are the main drivers of peasant action, hence placing a great deal of importance on the norms and values of peasant communities, Popkin shows that peasants follow a rational investment logic when deciding to join a new political or religious movement or using state institutions. "What is rational for an individual", Popkin writes, "may be very different from what is rational for an entire village or collective".

== Moral vs. political economy ==
The Rational Peasant is published three years after James C. Scott's The Moral Economy of the Peasant and is articulated as a critique of Scott's arguments. Despite studying the same phenomenon, namely the impact of colonialism and capitalism of traditional agrarian societies of Southeast Asia, they both derive completely opposed theories of peasant behavior.

=== Moral economy according to Popkin ===
Moral economists, Popkin writes, see peasants as fundamentally "antimarket", and "interpret violence as a defensive reaction against capitalism", and as an attempt to restore the moral underpinnings of the pre-capitalist society. Commercial activities like trading or buying and selling are not liked by peasants according to moral economists, seeing as they derive their welfare from suprafamily institutions like the village and the patron-client relationship. For moral economists, the market invariably damages the welfare of peasants. Popkin quotes historian Eric Hobsbawm who sees rural protests in nineteenth century Spain as natural following "the introduction of capitalist legal and social relationships". Thus, according to the moral economy approach, the moral basis of agrarian social relations is destroyed by what Popkin calls "the cash nexus".

The critique of this approach is insidious in Popkin's writing. He writes that the "paternalistic ethos" of non-market peasant-landlord relationships are seen by moral economists are more humane and inherently better for peasants since they protect his survival at all times- but nothing more. The land is not private but common property, including for the landowner. Thus, it is the entire community that starves during hard times, as opposed to individuals.

Popkin makes it clear he is not unilaterally rejecting the work of moral economists. In fact, he argues, the micro level of analysis pioneered by moral economists is necessary to use if one wants to understand peasant behavior. Furthermore, he also bases his analysis largely on the same two institutions which moral economists identified as central to agrarian communities: the village and patron-client relationships. However, Popkin sees central failures in the view that the subsistence ethic underpins the moral norms at the basis of society. Conflicts between group interests as well as the attraction for personal gain are not offshoot by village institutions which, in fact, accentuate the stratification of peasant society.

=== Introducing the political economy of peasant behaviour ===
==== Basic concepts ====
Popkin argues that peasants are rational actors, carefully calculating costs and benefits of each action or decision in function of their private interest. Political economy, thus, is inherently linked with collective action problems and prisoner's dilemma. This book refutes the moral economists' central claim that norms and values shape society: "I expect to find [...] that norms are malleable, renegotiated, and shifting in accord with considerations of power and strategic interaction among individuals. There's always a tradeoff between conflicting and inconsistent norms." More particularly, Popkin challenges the assumption that such norms are "given". He wants to determine where those norms come from, and what makes them enforceable.

==== Investments and gambles ====
Popkin notes that peasants make two types of investments: long term, and short term, which in turn enable them to make risky long-term investments. Peasants have the agency to determine whether they must invest in their own personal and private goods (their family, home, livestock, etc..) or on common goods (village infrastructure). Peasants can be selfish: Popkin finds that peasants in Tepotzlan did not help each other pay taxes. Furthermore, peasants know, according to Popkin, that prioritizing short-term prosperity and happiness can endanger the long term. The book argues that there are two kinds of subsistence crises:

1. The short-term starvation or other serious deadly concerns;
2. Long run subsistence crisis where a household will not have enough resources to build and maintain a family over time.

Thus, Popkin argues peasants are not only concerned with subsistence insurance but also gambling to protect their long-term security.

==== Re-conceptualizing villages ====
Popkin strongly challenges the moralists' view that villages are cohesive units of support for their inhabitants. He notes there is an inherent uncertainty in relying on village institutions for welfare. Yet, if moral economists argue that a certain set of morals make up for this uncertainty, Popkin still identifies an "investment logic" in the village and in the patron-client relationship. Even if that relation is based on morals, villagers expect a return on investment. Eventually, peasants make decisions based on their individual profit. In fact, Popkin argues that the more precarious the situation is, the less the inclusive schemes within villages work well. On the contrary, peasants rely increasingly on private, family investments for the long term to shield themselves from this uncertainty, while they prefer investing in the community for short-term gains. A good illustration of this is the fact that peasants will prioritize positions with "higher income and less variance" within the community, the ideal being a landowner. Frictions, Popkin notes, are bound to occur over dynamics of economic advancement within the village.

==== Free riding ====
As an extension of his re-conceptualization of villages, Popkin argues that communities do much more than provide material insurance based on a combination of land and labor production. The village is the main adjudicator of many aspects of collective daily life: from religious rituals to keeping the peace, including the management of common resources, there are many collective tasks that are hard to fulfill. "Political economy focuses on the factors which make it difficult to achieve even mutually beneficial collective action". The problem of collective action, succinctly stated, is that a rational agent won't occur the cost of a collective undertaking if he can receive the benefits without doing so. The paradigm, then, is that if a peasant attaches no particular moral value to the meaning of participation itself, his personal interest to receive the benefits without contributing will be at odds with the communities' interest to complete a project.

The moral economy view holds that there is a sufficient moral underpinning to peasant communities so that the collective action problem is easily solved. Peasants can thus be shamed or ostracized for the community if they do not contribute to collective projects. Popkin argues against this vision, seeing instead a constant rational calculation by the individual "on the returns versus the cost of his participation: Peasant institutions, therefore, have a built-in tension: the benefits of valuable village-wide services and leadership versus the chance of personal loss of power concentrated in the hands of another peasant".

===== The political entrepreneur =====
Popkin introduces a situation where a peasant makes "subjective estimates of the credibility and capability of the organizer [of a collective action]". This organizer is labeled by Popkin as a political entrepreneur. Collective action thus is based on the credibility of the would-be leader. Communication is essential: the leader must use symbols and references that are culturally familiar to peasants. For example, educated urbanites had a hard time rallying peasants around their cause because they were not able to fully convey their ideas to the community. Popkin argues that "immediate goals and payoffs" are key to satisfying the peasant's investment logic. This also explains why small groups are easier to mobilize than larger entities: free riders will be blackballed and chastised quicker, hence reducing the probability of defectors. In turn, peasants will be more likely to join. Leadership and efficient organization are thus absolute necessities in peasant communities where morals quickly cede the terrain to cold, hard, rational calculations.

==== Patron-client relationships ====
Popkin argues that the conception of patron-client relationships as "self-reinforcing, dyadic relations beneficial to both parties" limits our understanding of the complexities of such mechanisms. First, he writes, the peasants are always striving to increase their standard of living, and are generally never continent with the minimum not to starve to death. There is no moral fixation for the equilibrium of extraction- on the other hand, the parameters are bing constantly renegotiated by both parties who seek to gain the most from this relationship. The greatest danger to the patron is the peasant's ability to collectively organize. Thus, Popkin argues he will strive to "individualize relations" with each peasant, so as to create a unique bargaining space where the community is void. Rebellions come out not, as the moral economists would have it, on the automatic reaction to a breach in the moral compact, but much more crucially in the peasant's ability to solve the collective action problem.
