= Weapons of the Weak =

1985 book by James C. Scott

- First edition
- Author: James C. Scott
- Subject: Anthropology
- Published: 1985 (Yale University Press)
- Pages: 389
- ISBN: 0300033362

Weapons of the Weak: Everyday Forms of Peasant Resistance is a 1985 book on everyday forms of rural class conflict as illustrated in a Malaysian village, written by anthropologist James C. Scott and published by Yale University Press.

In Weapons of the Weak, Scott turns his attention to the daily, subtle forms of resistance employed by villagers, a shift from the traditionally studied grand narratives of revolutions and uprisings. His ethnographic research concentrates on seventy families in a Malaysian village, whose lives are profoundly affected by the introduction of irrigation and double cropping, leading to significant social changes.

The core of Scott's analysis lies in the various passive resistance strategies adopted by the villagers. These include: sabotage, foot-dragging, evasion, false compliance, pilfering, feigned ignorance, arson, dissimulation, and slander.

Though copyrighted in 1985, it was published in hardback in February 1986.

== See also ==
- Everyday Resistance
- Class struggle
- Critique of work
- Critique of political economy
- Symbolic interactionism
- Refusal of work
