= Political economy in anthropology =

Application of political economy methods to anthropological study

Political economy in anthropology is the application of the theories and methods of historical materialism to the traditional concerns of anthropology, including but not limited to non-capitalist societies. Political economy introduced questions of history and colonialism to ahistorical anthropological theories of social structure and culture. Most anthropologists moved away from modes of production analysis typical of structural Marxism, and focused instead on the complex historical relations of class, culture and hegemony in regions undergoing complex colonial and capitalist transitions in the emerging world system.

Political economy was introduced in American anthropology primarily through the support of Julian Steward, a student of Kroeber. Steward's research interests centered on “subsistence” — the dynamic interaction of man, environment, technology, social structure, and the organization of work. This emphasis on subsistence and production - as opposed to exchange - is what distinguishes the political economy approach. Steward's most theoretically productive years were from 1946 to 1953, while teaching at Columbia University. At this time, Columbia saw an influx of World War II veterans who were attending school thanks to the GI Bill. Steward quickly developed a coterie of students who would go on to develop Political Economy as a distinct approach in anthropology, including Sidney Mintz, Eric Wolf, Eleanor Leacock, Roy Rappaport, Stanley Diamond, Robert Manners, Morton Fried, Robert F. Murphy, and influenced other scholars such as Elman Service, Marvin Harris and June Nash. Many of these students participated in the Puerto Rico Project, a large-scale group research study that focused on modernization in Puerto Rico.

Three main areas of interest rapidly developed. The first of these areas was concerned with the "pre-capitalist" societies that were subject to evolutionary "tribal" stereotypes. Sahlins' work on hunter-gatherers as the "original affluent society" did much to dissipate that image. The second area was concerned with the vast majority of the world's population at the time, the peasantry, many of whom were involved in complex revolutionary wars such as in Vietnam. The third area was on colonialism, imperialism, and the creation of the capitalist world-system.

More recently, these political economists have more directly addressed issues of industrial (and post-industrial) capitalism around the world.

== Theory ==
=== Cultural materialism ===
Cultural materialism is a research orientation introduced by Marvin Harris in 1968 (The Rise of Anthropological Theory), as a theoretical paradigm and research strategy. Indeed, it is said to be the most enduring achievement of that work. Harris subsequently developed a defense of the paradigm in his 1979 book Cultural Materialism. To Harris, cultural materialism "is based on the simple premise that human social life is a response to the practical problems of earthly existence".

Harris' approach was influenced by but distinct from Marx. Harris' method was to demonstrate how particular cultural practices (like the Hindu prohibition on harming cattle) served a materialistic function (such as preserving an essential source of fertilizer from being consumed).

Economic behavior has a cultural side which indicates that the works of anthropologists is relevant to economics. The Motivation behind cultural materialism is mainly to show that cultures adapt to the environment they're produced in.

=== Structural Marxism ===
Structural Marxism was an approach to Marxist philosophy based on structuralism, primarily associated with the work of the French philosopher Louis Althusser and his students. It was influential in France during the 1960s and 1970s, and also came to influence philosophers, political theorists and anthropologists outside France during the 1970s. French structuralist Marxism melded Marxist political economy with Levi-Strauss's structural methodology, eliminating the human subject, dialectical reason and history in the process. Structural Marxists introduced two major concepts, mode of production and social formation, that allowed for a more prolonged and uneven transition to capitalism than either dependency or World systems theory allowed for. A mode of production consisting of producers, non-producers and means of production, combined in a variety of ways, formed the deep structure of a "social formation." A social formation combined (or "articulated") several modes of production, only one of which was dominant or determinant. Primary anthropological theorists of this school included Maurice Godelier, Claude Meillassoux, Emmanuel Terray and Pierre-Philippe Rey. Structural Marxism arose in opposition to the humanistic Marxism that dominated many western universities during the 1970s. In contrast to Humanistic Marxism, Althusser stressed that Marxism was a science that examined objective structures.

=== Cultural materialism ===
Critical influences on Structural Marxism, primarily from the British Marxist historical tradition, included E.P. Thompson, Eric Hobsbawm and Raymond Williams. They criticized the functionalist emphasis in Structural Marxism, that neglected individuals in favour of the structural elements of their model. The British school was more interested in class, culture and politics, and placed human subjects at the centre of analysis. Where mode of production analysis was abstract, they focused on people. Where world-systems theory had little to say about the local, the Cultural Materialists began and ended there. Others connected with this school of thought concentrated on issues such as ethnic formation, labor migration, remittances, household formation, food production and the processes of colonialism.

== The anthropology of pre-capitalist societies ==
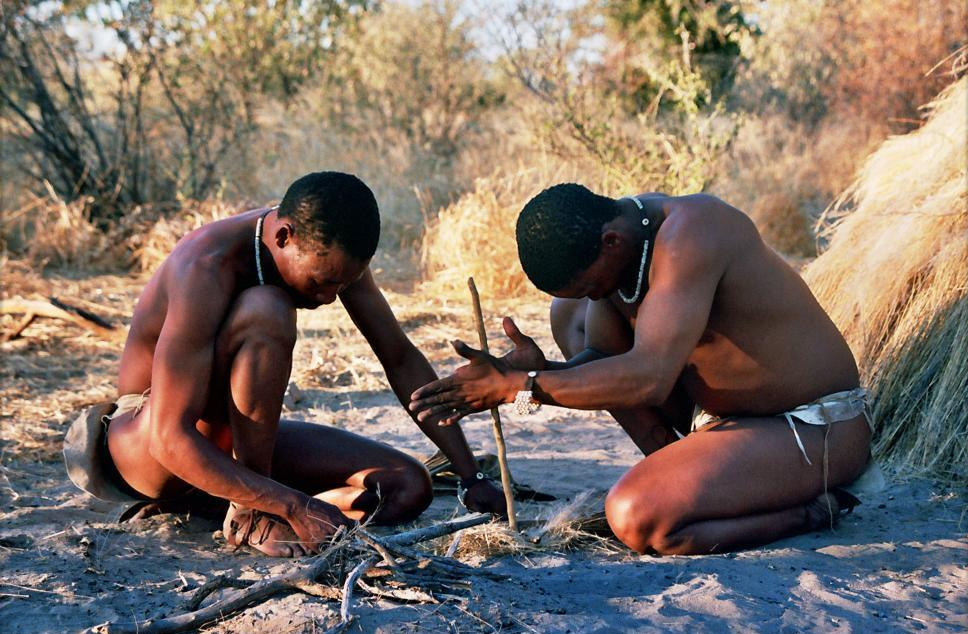
Dobe !Kung men lighting a fire.

As anthropologists embraced "mode of production" analysis in the 1950s, they struggled to adapt its evolutionary model to the groups that they had traditionally worked with. While Marxist analysis was developed to account for capitalist society and its class dynamics, it had little to say about "pre-capitalist" societies, other than to define them by what they were not. One of the first attempts to theorize Hunter-gatherer society was Marshall Sahlins Stone Age Economics (1972) which overturned nineteenth century ideas that characterized life in such societies as "nasty, brutish and short". Sahlins demonstrated that actual existing hunter-gatherers lived in "the original affluent society"; their needs were met with relatively little work leaving them with far more leisure time than western industrial societies. Richard B. Lee's work amongst the Dobe !Kung of Botswana provided a detailed case study of the argument, even in one of the most hostile desert environments. The second part of Sahlins' book applies Chayanov's theories to develop a theory of a "Domestic mode of production." Given the argument of the "original affluent society" that many of these societies had abundant resources, Sahlins argued that the limit on production was the amount of labour available. Young families with many dependent children had to work harder, whereas older families with mature children and many workers worked much less. The final sections developed a theory of reciprocity discussed above.

An alternate model of the Domestic Mode of Production was developed by Eric Wolf, who rejected the evolutionary implications of Sahlins' model and argued that this mode of production should be viewed as the product of developing colonial trade relations.

Several collections addressing the question of mode of production analysis in classless societies came out in this period, including "The Anthropology of Pre-Capitalist Societies" and "Marxist Analysis and Social Anthropology".

== Development of the state ==
Political economists such as Morton Fried, Elman Service, and Eleanor Leacock took a Marxist approach and sought to understand the origins and development of inequality in human society. Marx and Engels had drawn on the ethnographic work of Lewis H. Morgan, and these authors now extended that tradition. In particular, they were interested in the evolution of social systems over time.

== Colonialism and imperialism ==
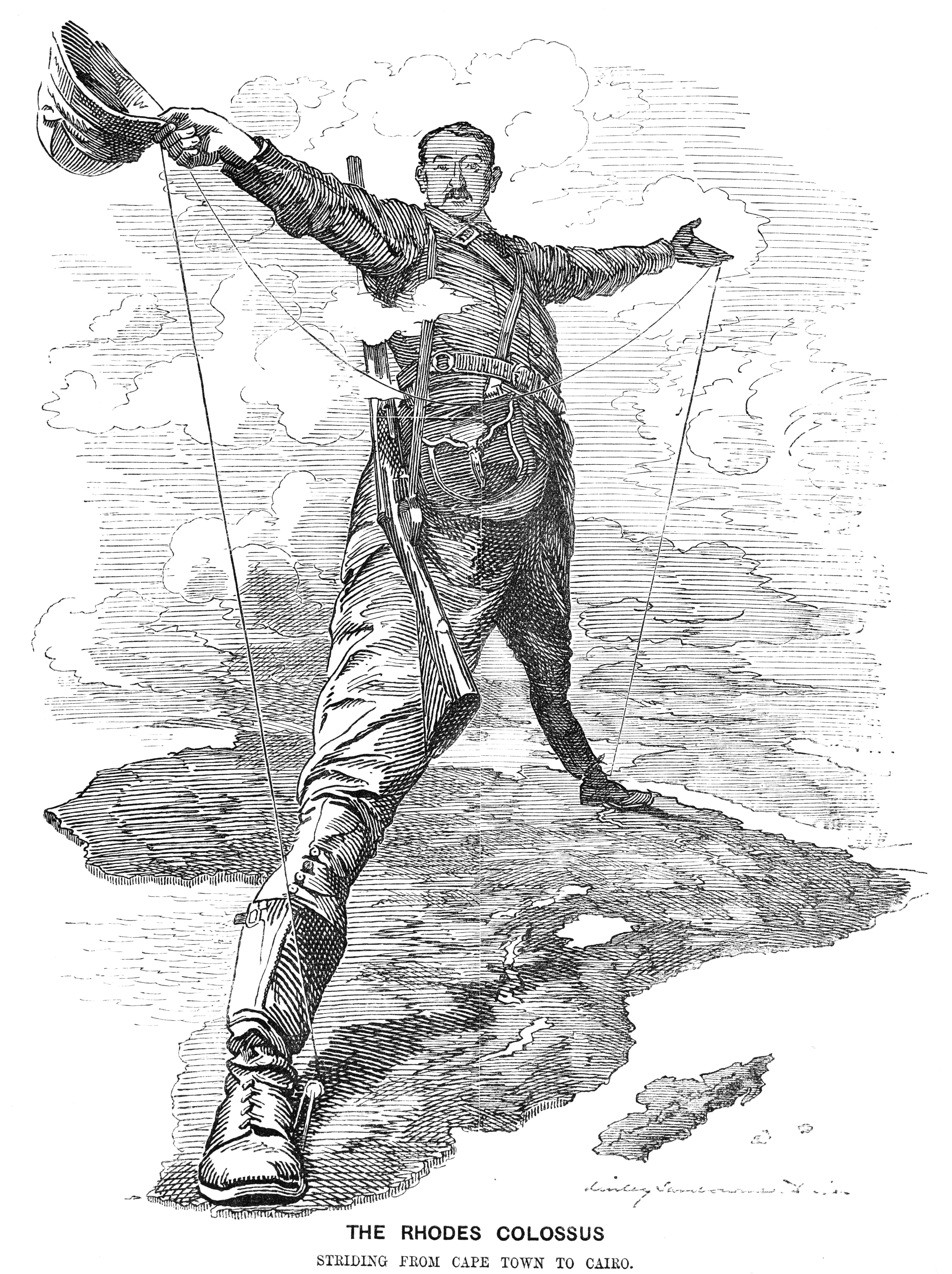
Cecil Rhodes, as The Rhodes Colossus, driving force of British imperialism in Africa

=== Articulated modes of production ===
The articulation of modes of production within a single formation was meant to account for the influence of colonialism on lineage modes of production, primarily in the African context. According to Hann and Hart, the short lived success of the theory was that

it produced a version of structural-functionalism at once sufficiently different from the original to persuade English-speakers that they were learning Marxism and similar enough to allow them to retain their customary way of thinking, which had been temporarily discredited by its role in the administration of empire.

=== World-systems theory and dependency theory ===
Dependency Theory arose as a theory in Latin America in reaction to modernization theory. It argues that resources flow from a "periphery" of poor and underdeveloped states to a "core" of wealthy states, enriching the latter at the expense of the former. It is a central contention of dependency theory that poor states are impoverished and rich ones enriched by the way poor states are integrated into the "World-system" and hence poor countries will not follow Rostow's predicted path of modernization. Dependency Theory rejected Rostow's view, arguing that underdeveloped countries are not merely primitive versions of developed countries, but have unique features and structures of their own; and, importantly, are in the situation of being the weaker members in a world market economy and hence unable to change the system.

Immanuel Wallerstein's "world-systems theory" was the version of Dependency Theory that most North American anthropologists engaged with. His theories are similar to Dependency Theory, although he placed more emphasis on the system as system, and focused on the developments of the core rather than periphery. Wallerstein also provided an historical account of the development of capitalism which had been missing from Dependency Theory.

Both versions of Dependency Theory were critiqued throughout the 1970s for the static historical accounts they provided. Their influence was slowly replaced by more dynamic and historically sensitive versions, such as Eric Wolf's "Europe and the People Without History."

=== Eric Wolf and Europe and the people without history ===
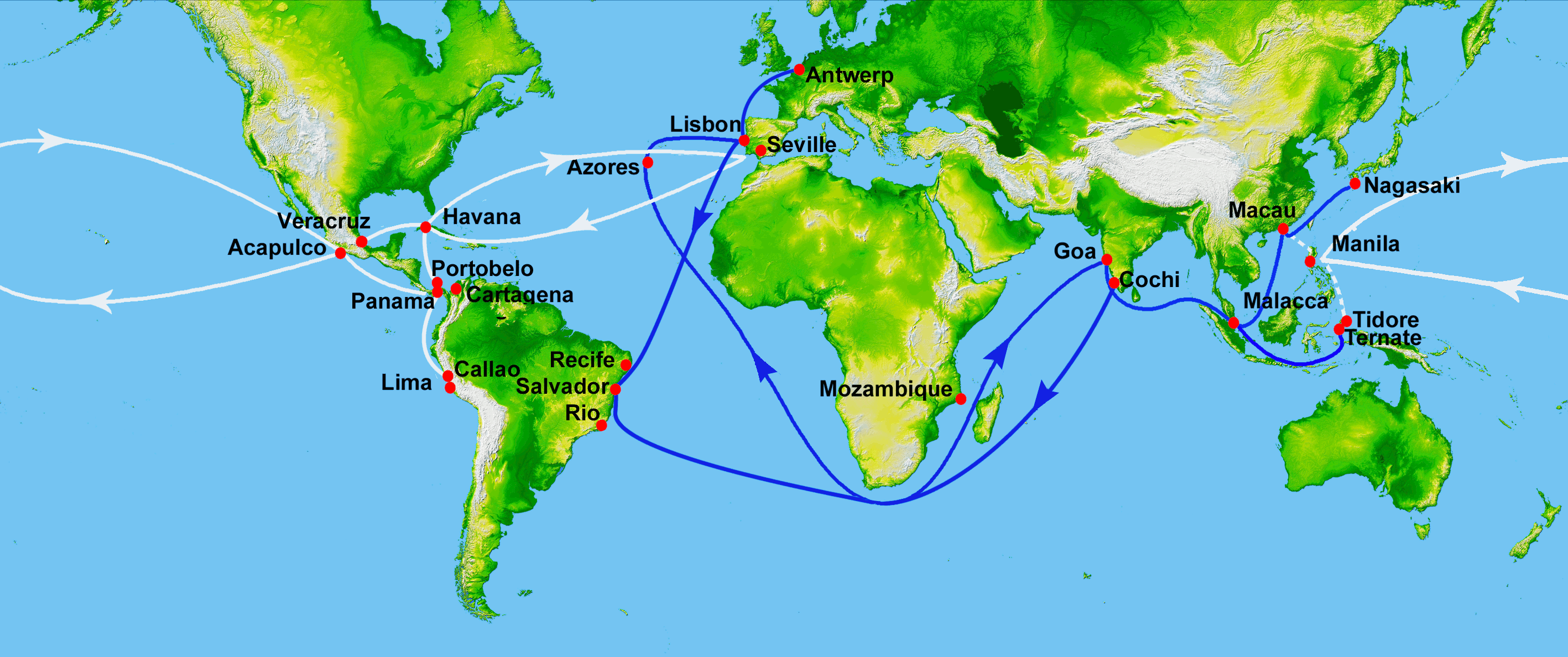
16th-century Portuguese (blue) and Spanish (white) trade routes

"Europe and the people without history" is history written on a global scale, tracing the connections between communities, regions, peoples and nations that are usually treated as discrete subjects. The book begins in 1400 with a description of the trade routes a world traveller might have encountered, the people and societies they connected, and the civilizational processes trying to incorporate them. From this, Wolf traces the emergence of Europe as a global power, and the reorganization of particular world regions for the production of goods now meant for global consumption. Wolf differs from World Systems theory in that he sees the growth of Europe until the late eighteenth century operating in a tributary framework, and not capitalism. He examines the way that colonial state structures were created to protect tributary populations involved in the silver, fur and slave trades. Whole new "tribes" were created as they were incorporated into circuits of mercantile accumulation. The final section of the book deals with the transformation in these global networks as a result of the growth of capitalism with the industrial revolution. Factory production of textiles in England, for example transformed cotton production in the American South and Egypt, and eliminated textile production in India. All these transformations are connected in a single structural change. Each of the world's regions are examined in terms of the goods they produced in the global division of labour, as well as the mobilization and migration of whole populations (such as African slaves) to produce these goods. Wolf uses labor market segmentation to provide an historical account of the creation of ethnic segmentation. Where World Systems theory had little to say about the periphery, Wolf's emphasis is on the people "without history" (i.e. not given a voice in western histories) and on how they were active participants in the creation of new cultural and social forms emerging in the context of commercial empire.

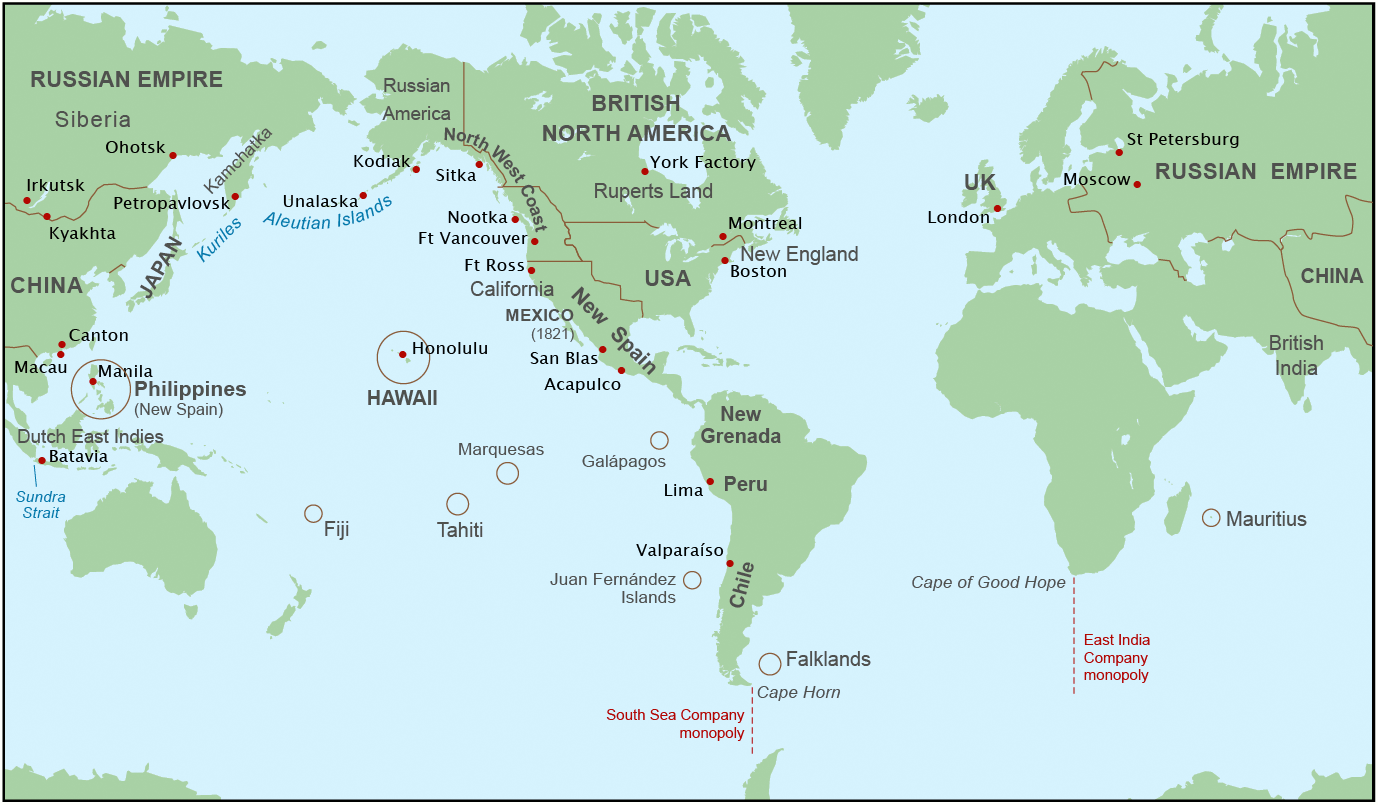
Maritime Fur Trade, 1790–1840.

Wolf distinguishes between three modes of production: capitalist, kin-ordered, and tributary. Wolf does not view them as an evolutionary sequence. He begins with capitalism because he argues our understanding of kin-ordered and tributary modes is coloured by our understanding of capitalism. He argues they are not evolutionary precursors of capitalism, but the product of the encounter between the West and the Rest. In the tributary mode, direct producers possess their own means of production, but their surplus production is taken from them through extra economic means. This appropriation is usually by some form of strong or weak state. In the kin-ordered mode of production, social labour is mobilized through kin relations (such as lineages), although his description makes its exact relations with tributary and capitalist modes unclear. The kin mode was further theorized by French structuralist Marxists in terms of 'articulated modes of production.' The kin-ordered mode is distinct again from Sahlins' formulation of the domestic mode of production.

== Unfree labour and slavery ==
Liberal and neo-liberal market-based societies are predicated upon the concept of "free labour" - workers enter a labour market freely, and enter into contractual relations with employers voluntarily. "Unfree labour" - otherwise known as bond labour, debt bondage, debt peonage, and slavery, are thought to be archaic forms that will be eliminated with capitalist development. Anthropologists working in a wide variety of current situations have documented that the incidence of bonded labour is much greater than capitalist ideology would lead us to expect.

Tom Brass argues that unfree labour is not an archaic holdover in today's world, but an active process of deproletarianization of agricultural workers to provide rural agrarian capitalists with cheaper labour. In the constant drive to cheapen the cost of agricultural labour, debt bondage is used to tie workers to specific employers, lower their wages, and extract further unpaid labour from them. He illustrates this process at work in Peru and India.

An early study of debt bondage was Ann Laura Stoler's Capitalism and Confrontation in Sumatra's Plantation Belt, 1870-1979 (1985). Stoler examined the tobacco plantations of the Deli Maatschappij, one of the most profitable Dutch colonial corporations of the 19th century. The Deli company imported large numbers of Chinese indentured labourers to Sumatra, Indonesia, where they were treated not as employees, but as contractors. As contractors they had to buy all their supplies at inflated prices from the company, take all the risks of cultivation and processing, and finally sell their tobacco to the company at prices it set. They were kept in perpetual debt, unable to change employers, in working conditions that resulted in extraordinarily high death rates. Jan Breman extended this analysis of the "Coolie regulation" (which allowed for indentured labour) to the Dutch mining industry in the Netherlands East Indies (Indonesia).

Slavery is but one form of unfree (or bound) labour. Structural Marxists sought to theorize it as a mode of production. Claude Meillassoux has refined this approach in his study of pre-colonial African slavery. He analyzed the military and aristocratic systems that organized the capture of slaves and situated it within the politics of the merchants who organized the trade in slaves. His work focuses on the forces at play within a kinship organized polity that define slaves culturally as "anti-kin."

== Peasant studies and agrarian change ==
=== Simple commodity production and the peasantry ===
Simple commodity production (also known as "petty commodity production") is a term coined by Frederick Engels to describe productive activities under the conditions of what Marx had called the "simple exchange" of commodities, where independent producers such as peasants trade their own products. The use of the word "simple" does not refer to the nature of the producers or of their production, but to the relatively simple and straightforward exchange processes involved. Simple commodity production is compatible with many different relations of production, ranging from self-employment where the producer owns his means of production, and family labour, to forms of slavery, peonage, indentured labour, and serfdom.

=== Capitalist transitions and agrarian change ===
Michael Taussig, for example, examined the reactions of peasant farmers in Colombia as they struggled to understand how money could make interest. Taussig highlights that we have fetishized money. We view money as an active agent, capable of doing things, of growth. In viewing money as an active agent, we obscure the social relationships that actually give money its power. The Colombian peasants, seeking to explain how money could bear interest, turned to folk beliefs like the "baptism of money" to explain how money could grow. Dishonest individuals would have money baptized, which would then become an active agent; whenever used to buy goods, it would escape the till and return to its owner.

=== Peasant wars of the twentieth century ===
Written in 1969 by Eric Wolf, Peasant Wars of the Twentieth Century, is a comparative view of the peasant revolutions of Mexico, Russia, China, Vietnam, Algeria, and Cuba.

=== The moral economy of the peasant ===
The concept of a moral economy was first elaborated by English historian E.P. Thompson, and was developed further in anthropological studies of other peasant economies. Thompson wrote of the moral economy of the poor in the context of widespread food riots in the English countryside in the late eighteenth century. According to Thompson these riots were generally peaceable acts that demonstrated a common political culture rooted in feudal rights to “set the price” of essential goods in the market. These peasants held that a traditional “fair price” was more important to the community than a “free” market price and they punished large farmers who sold their surpluses at higher prices outside the village while there were still those in need within the village. The notion of a non-capitalist cultural mentalité using the market for its own ends has been linked by others (with Thompson's approval) to subsistence agriculture and the need for subsistence insurance in hard times.

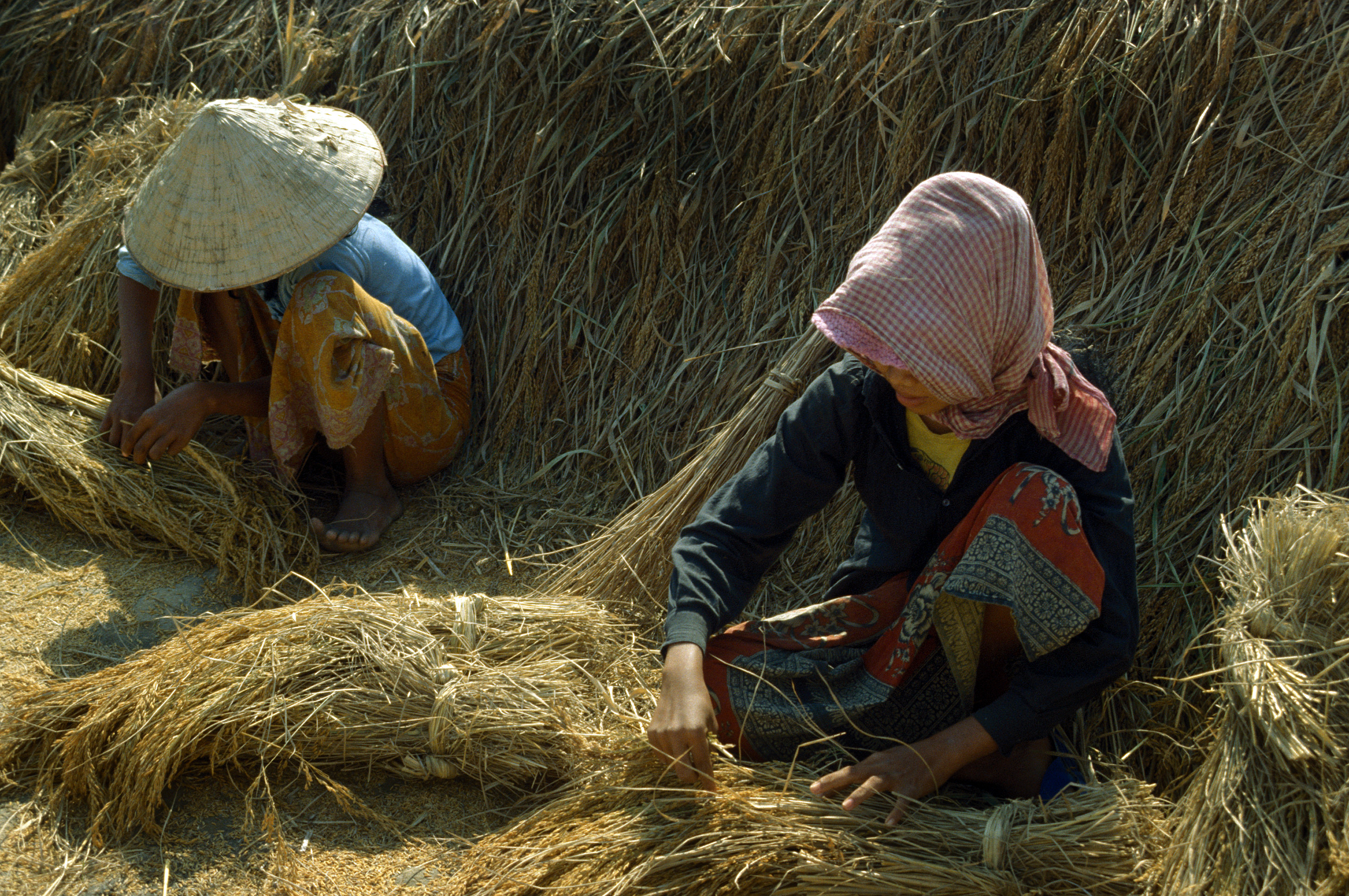
Cambodian rice farming

The concept was widely popularized in anthropology through the book, "The Moral Economy of the Peasant: Rebellion and Subsistence in Southeast Asia" by James C. Scott (1976). The book begins with a telling metaphor of peasants being like a man standing up to his nose in water; the smallest wave will drown him. Similarly, peasants generally live so close to the subsistence line that it takes little to destroy their livelihoods. From this, he infers a set of economic principles that it would be rational for them to live by. This book was not based on fieldwork, and itself proposed a cross-cultural universalistic model of peasant economic behaviour based upon a set of fixed theoretical principles, not a reading of peasant culture. Firstly, he argued that peasants were "risk averse", or, put differently, followed a "safety first" principle. They would not adopt risky new seeds or technologies, no matter how promising, because tried and true traditional methods had demonstrated, not promised, effectiveness. This gives peasants an unfair reputation as "traditionalist" when in fact they are just risk averse. Secondly, Scott argues that peasant society provides "subsistence insurance" for its members to tide them over those occasions when natural or man-made disaster strikes. Although fieldwork has not supported many of Scott's conclusions, the book encouraged a generation of researchers.

== See also ==
- Cultural hegemony
- Critique of political economy
