= Freedom and Destiny =

2006 book by Patricia Uberoi

Freedom and Destiny: Gender, Family and Popular Culture in India
- Author: Patricia Uberoi
- Language: English
- Genre: Non-fiction
- Publisher: Oxford University Press
- Publication date: 2006
- Publication place: India

Freedom and Destiny: Gender, Family and Popular Culture in India is a book consisting of eight essays by Indian feminist and sociologist Patricia Uberoi. The book, which was published by Oxford University Press in New Delhi in 2006 looks at the site of popular culture to examine institutions such as the Indian Family, the conjugal unit, the symbol of the woman as well as the iconography of the baby and child in the Indian imagination. The essays in the book, with the exception of the introduction, had previously appeared in various books and journals. The disparate essays were collected into a volume. Patricia Uberoi begins the volume by reflecting on the wider implications of the misspelled epithet 'Beautiful Wife, Denger Life' seen at the back of a New Delhi truck. These reflections form a starting point for the essays that follow in the volume.

== Synopsis ==
The book which is divided into eight chapters looks at three sites of popular culture in order to identify the contradictions built into family and social life. These are the sites of Calendar Art, Popular Cinema and Romance Fiction.

=== Calendar Art ===
Patricia Uberoi traces the Calendar art form ( mass-produced colour prints) in India back to its early imaginings in the late nineteenth century colonial India. She examines how the highly visibilized figure of the woman's body in this art form is both cemented as an object of desire and presented as a commodity for sale. However the figure of the woman is not only contained in the lens of commodification and objectification but also becomes a symbol of a consistently modernising nation. Representations of Hindu Goddesses, either as consorts of Hindu Gods or in their capacities as mothers are also examined for their social and political implications. Varied notions of femininity and womanliness are examined through this medium. Uberoi's work joins a number of emerging discourses on the print economies and varied interpretations of calendar art. The iconography of the baby or child in calendar art is also noted in the book. Babies are variedly represented as the God-Baby, the Welcome Baby, the Hero Baby, the Citizen Baby, and the Customized Baby. Uberoi does not only examine the art form but also reflects upon the socio-political economies that contributed to its emergence and popularity.

=== Popular Cinema ===
Uberoi uses four extremely popular Bollywood films – Sahib, Bibi aur Ghulam, Hum Aapke Hain Kaun, Dilwale Dulhania Le Jaayenge and Pardes to examine a variety of themes, ideas and institutions reproduced in Hindi Cinema as well as to comment on the general conventions of the art form, which spaces allow for patriarchal power to be reinforced and which spaces allow for a subversion of this power. The chapter on Sahib, Bibi aur Ghulam explores how the cinematic narrative focuses on the tussle between individual desire and social duty and freedom and destiny within the man-woman relationship. The chapter on Hum Aapke Hain Kaun is an ethnography of the viewing of the film and is a close look at the Indian Family and how it negotiates power and duty. Through her examination of the films Pardes and Dilwale Dulhania Le Jaayenge, Uberoi looks at the Indian Diaspora and notions of home and country.

=== Romance Fiction ===
Patricia Uberoi looks at how the narratives of romantic fiction published in the English Language magazine Woman's Era serves important and cautionary functions for its women readers. Uberoi takes care to mention that this art form is not received in exactly the same way that romance fiction in the West is received even though the plots and styles may sound similar. This section looks at how the often formulaic plots offer up a range of platitudes for happy hetero-normative conjugal and family life.

== Original Title ==
In the preface to the book, Uberoi explains that she had intended the title of the book to be 'Dharma and Desire' in order to encapsulate Indian feminists engagement with the tussle between female desire and 'culturally normative expectations of feminine deportment.' She later changed the title to Freedom and Destiny so that one could identify the moral economy of family and social life as well see how notions of modernity ruptured individual autonomy and freedom for both men and women.

== See also ==
- Feminism in India
