= Southeast Asian Massif =

Geographical region in Southeastern Asia

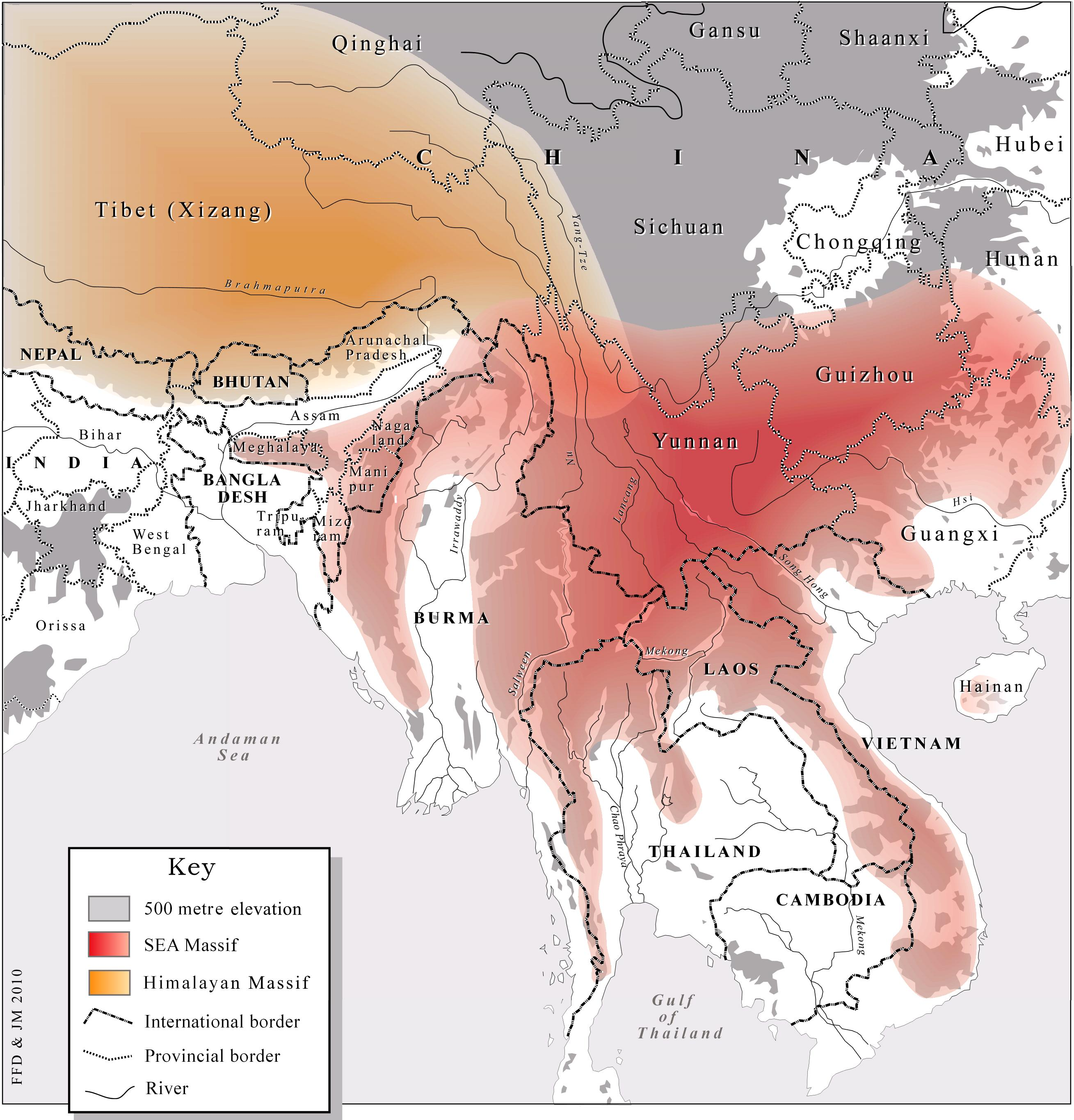

The term Southeast Asian Massif was proposed in 1997 by anthropologist Jean Michaud to discuss the human societies inhabiting the lands above an elevation of approximately 300 metres (1,000 ft) in the southeastern portion of the Asian landmass, thus not merely in the uplands of conventional Mainland Southeast Asia. It concerns highlands overlapping parts of 10 countries: southwest China, Northeast India, eastern Bangladesh, and all the highlands of Myanmar (Burma), Thailand, Vietnam, Laos, Cambodia, Peninsular Malaysia, and Taiwan. The indigenous population encompassed within these limits numbers approximately 100 million, not counting migrants from surrounding lowland majority groups who came to settle in the highlands over the last few centuries.

The notion of the Southeast Asian Massif overlaps geographically with the eastern segment of Van Schendel's notion of Zomia proposed in 2002, while it overlaps geographically with what political scientist James C. Scott called Zomia in 2009. While the notion of Zomia underscores a historical and political understanding of that high region, the Southeast Asian Massif is more appropriately labelled a place or a social space.

The Tibetan world is not included in the massif, as it has its own logic: a centralized and religiously harmonised core with a long, distinctive political existence that places it in a "feudal" and imperial category, which the societies historically associated with the massif have rarely, if ever, developed into.

== Historical, linguistic and cultural factors ==
To further qualify the particularities of the massif, a series of core factors can be incorporated: history, languages, religion, customary social structures, economies, and political relationships with lowland states. What distinguishes highland societies may exceed what they have in common: a vast ecosystem, a state of marginality, and forms of subordination. The massif is crossed by six major language families (Austroasiatic, Hmong–Mien, Kra–Dai, Sino-Tibetan, Indo-European, Austronesian), none of which forms a decisive majority. In religious terms, several groups are Animist, others are Buddhist, some are Christian, a good number share Taoist and Confucian values, the Hui are Muslim, the Kuki-Chin-speaking Bnei Menashe are Jewish, while most societies sport a complex syncretism. Throughout history, feuds and frequent hostilities between local groups were evidence of the plurality of cultures. The region has never been united politically, not as an empire, nor as a space shared among a few feuding kingdoms, not even as a zone with harmonised political systems. Forms of distinct customary political organisations, chiefly lineage based versus "feudal", have long existed.

Along with other transnational highlands around the Himalayas and around the world, the Southeast Asian Massif is marginal and fragmented in historical, economic, as well as cultural terms. It may thus be seen as lacking the necessary significance in the larger scheme of things to be proposed as a promising area subdivision of Asian studies. However, it is important to rethink country based research when addressing trans-border and marginal societies.

Inquiries on the ground throughout the massif show that these peoples share a sense of being different from the national majorities, a sense of geographical remoteness, and a state of marginality that is connected to political and economic distance from regional seats of power. In cultural terms, these highland societies are like a cultural mosaic with contrasting colours, rather than an integrated picture in harmonized shades – what Terry Rambo, talking from a Vietnam perspective, has dubbed "a psychedelic nightmare".

Historically, these highlands have been used by lowland empires as reserves of resources (including slaves), and as buffer spaces between their domains.

== Zomia ==
Zomia is a geographical term coined in 2002 by historian Willem van Schendel of the University of Amsterdam to refer to the huge mass of mainland Southeast Asia that has historically been beyond the control of governments based in the population centers of the lowlands. It largely overlaps with the geographical extent of the Southeast Asian Massif, although the exact boundaries of Zomia differ among scholars: all would include the highlands of north Indochina (north Vietnam and all Laos), Thailand, the Shan Hills of northern Myanmar, and the mountains of Southwest China; some extend the region as far west as Tibet, Northeast India, Pakistan, and Afghanistan. These areas share a common elevated, rugged terrain, and have been the home of ethnic minorities that have preserved their local cultures by residing far from state control and influence. Other scholars have used the term to discuss the similar ways that Southeast Asian governments have handled minority groups.

=== Etymology ===
The name is from "Zomi", a term for highlanders common to several related Tibeto-Burman languages spoken in the India-Bangladesh-Myanmar border area.

=== James C. Scott ===
Professor James C. Scott of Yale University used the concept of Zomia in his 2009 book The Art of Not Being Governed: An Anarchist History of Upland Southeast Asia to argue that the continuity of the ethnic cultures living there provides a counter-narrative to the traditional story about modernity: namely, that once people are exposed to the conveniences of modern technology and the modern state, they will assimilate. Rather, the tribes in Zomia are conscious refugees from state rule and state-centered economies. From his preface:

[Hill tribes] seen from the valley kingdoms as "our living ancestors", "what we were like before we discovered wet-rice cultivation, Buddhism, and civilization [are on the contrary] best understood as runaway, fugitive, maroon communities who have, over the course of two millennia, been fleeing the oppressions of state-making projects in the valleys—slavery, conscription, taxes, corvée labor, epidemics, and warfare.

Scott goes on to add that Zomia is the biggest remaining area of earth whose inhabitants have not been completely absorbed by nation-states, although that time is coming to an end. While Zomia is exceptionally diverse linguistically, the languages spoken in the hills are distinct from those spoken in the plains. Kinship structures, at least formally, also distinguish the hills from the lowlands. Hill societies do produce "a surplus", but they do not use that surplus to support kings and monks. Distinctions of status and wealth abound in the hills, as in the valleys. The difference is that in the valleys they tend to be enduring, while in the hills they are both unstable and geographically confined.

=== Differing perspectives ===
Jean Michaud explains the many dilemmas that arise from the language used to address the group of people residing in Zomia in his Historical Dictionary of the Peoples of the Southeast Asian Massif. The people of Zomia are often referred to as "national minority groups," and Michaud argues that contention arises with each of these words. In regards to the word "national," Michaud claims that the peoples of the Southeast Asian Massif are in fact transnational, as many groups span over several countries. According to Michaud, "minority" is not the legitimate way to label the group either, since the populations are so vast. Michaud even claims that the word "group" is problematic because of its connotation with community and “social cohesion” that not all groups share.

In 2010, the Journal of Global History published a special issue, "Zomia and Beyond". In this issue, contemporary historians and social scientists of Southeast Asia respond to Scott's arguments. For example, although Southeast Asian expert Victor Lieberman agrees that the highland people crafted their own social worlds in response to the political and natural environments that they encountered, he also finds Scott's documentation to be very weak, especially its lack of Burmese-language sources, saying that not only does this undermine several of Scott's key arguments, but it brings some of his other theories about Zomia into question.

Furthermore, Lieberman argues that Scott is overestimating the importance of manpower as a determinant in military success. While the bulk of Scott's argument rests on the efforts of lowland states to dominate the highlands, Lieberman shows the importance of maritime commerce as an equally contributing factor.

Lieberman also says that examples not included in Scott's analysis need to be taken into consideration. Scott firmly believes that the culture took shape as a defensive mechanism, as a reaction to surrounding political and social environments. Lieberman, however, argues that the highland peoples of Borneo/Kalimantan had virtually the same cultural characteristics as the Zomians, such as the proliferation of local languages and swidden cultivation, which were all developed without a lowland predatory state.

More recently, Scott's claims have been questioned by Tom Brass. Brass maintains that it is incorrect to characterize upland Southeast Asia as "state-repelling" "zones of refuge/asylum" to which people voluntarily migrate. This is, he argues, an idealization consistent with the "new" populist postmodernism, but not supported by ethnographic evidence. The latter suggests that populations neither choose to migrate to upland areas (but go because they are forced off valley land), nor – once there – are they beyond the reach of the lowland State. Consequently, they are anything but empowered and safe in such contexts.

Edward Stringham and Caleb J. Miles analyzed historical and anthropological evidence from societies in Southeast Asia and concluded that they have avoided states for thousands of years. Stringham further analyzes the institutions used to avoid, repel and prevent would-be states. He further concludes that stateless societies like "Zomia" have successfully repelled states using location, specific production methods, and cultural resistance to states.

== See also ==
- Burma Road
- Hill tribe (Thailand)
- Mainland Southeast Asia linguistic area
- Mandala (political model)
- Monthon
