= Mountains of Southwest China =

Biodiversity hotspot in China

The Mountains of Southwest China is a biodiversity hotspot designated by Conservation International which includes several temperate coniferous forests in southwestern China, which lie in the river valleys on the southeastern corner of the Tibetan Plateau, between the alpine scrublands and steppes of the Tibetan Plateau and the temperate broadleaf and mixed and subtropical moist broadleaf forests of central and southeastern China and northern Myanmar. The hotspot is mostly in China, in the provinces of Tibet, Sichuan, Qinghai, and Gansu, and extending into the northwestern Myanmar.

== Geography ==
The ecoregions in the hotspot include:

- Hengduan Mountains subalpine conifer forests
- Nujiang Lancang Gorge alpine conifer and mixed forests
- Qionglai-Minshan conifer forests (in the Qionglai and Min mountains of central and northern Sichuan; home to Sichuan Giant Panda Sanctuaries)

== See also ==
- Zomia (geography)
