= Eric Tagliacozzo =

Eric Tagliacozzo (born 1967) is the John Stambaugh Professor of History at Cornell University, where he teaches Southeast Asian history. He is the director of Cornell's Comparative Muslim Societies Program, the director of the Cornell Modern Indonesia Project, and the contributing editor of the journal Indonesia.

== Life ==
Tagliacozzo received his B.A. from Haverford College in 1989 and his Ph.D. from Yale University in 1999. He studied with Ben Kiernan, James C. Scott, and Jonathan Spence in the History Department at Yale University. He was the Hung Leung Hau Ling Distinguished Visiting Professor in the Humanities and Social Sciences at the University of Hong Kong in 2017-2018.

== Academics ==
Tagliacozzo has focused much of his scholarship on the late colonial era in Southeast Asia, with an emphasis on people in motion, including the migration of ideas and materials. His first book, Secret Trades, Porous Borders: Smuggling and States Along a Southeast Asian Frontier, 1865-1915 (Yale, 2005), was an analysis of colonial frontier enforcement and contraband activity, and the far-reaching effects of its political economies. It won the 2007 Harry J. Benda Book Prize from the Association for Asian Studies. Several edited volumes also look at Southeast Asia's connections with the Middle East; at the idea of Indonesia over a two thousand year-period; and at the meeting of History and Anthropology generally (and conceptually) as disciplines. The Longest Journey: Southeast Asians and the Pilgrimage to Mecca (Oxford, 2013) examines transnational movement over a span of seven centuries in the first comprehensive history of the Hajj across the Indian Ocean.

== Prizes ==
He was cited as one of the "ten best professors at Cornell," and won the university's Stephen and Margery Russell Teaching Prize in 2016.

== Books ==
- Tagliacozzo, Eric (2022). In Asian Waters: Oceanic Worlds from Yemen to Yokohama. Princeton University Press. ISBN 978-0-691-14682-9.
- Secret Trades, Porous Borders: Smuggling and States Along a Southeast Asian Frontier, 1865-1915. Yale University Press. 2008. ISBN 978-0-300-12812-3.
- ——, ed. (2009). Southeast Asia and the Middle East: Islam, Movement, and the Longue Durée. Stanford University Press. ISBN 978-0-8047-6133-8.
- Hellwig, Tineke; ——, eds. (2009). The Indonesia Reader: History, Culture, Politics. Duke University Press. ISBN 978-0-8223-9227-9.
- ——; Willford, Andrew, eds. (2009). Clio/Anthropos: Exploring the Boundaries between History and Anthropology. Stanford University Press. ISBN 978-0-8047-7240-2.
- Wen-chin Chang (2011). —— (ed.). Chinese Circulations: Capital, Commodities, and Networks in Southeast Asia. Duke University Press. ISBN 978-0-8223-4903-7.
- —— (2013). The Longest Journey: Southeast Asians and the Pilgrimage to Mecca. Oxford University Press. ISBN 978-0-19-530828-0.
- ——, ed. (2014). Producing Indonesia: The State of the Field of Indonesian Studies. Cornell University, Southeast Asia Program Publications. ISBN 978-0-87727-302-8.
- ——; Wen-Chin Chang, eds. (2014). Burmese Lives: Ordinary Life Stories Under the Burmese Regime. Oxford University Press. ISBN 978-0-19-933504-6.
- ——; Siu, Helen; Perdue, Peter, eds. (2015). Asia Inside Out. Changing Times. Harvard University Press. ISBN 978-0-674598508.
- ——; Siu, Helen; Perdue, Peter, eds. (2015). Asia Inside Out. Connected Places. Harvard University Press. ISBN 978-0-674967687.
- ——; Siu, Helen; Perdue, Peter, eds. (2019). Asia Inside Out. Itinerant People. Harvard University Press. ISBN 978-0-674987630.
- ——; Toorawa, Shawkat, eds. (2016). Hajj: Pilgrimage in Islam. Cambridge University Press. ISBN 978-1107612808.
