= Everyday resistance =

Form of resistance based on the actions of people in their everyday lives

Everyday resistance is a form of resistance based on the actions of people in their everyday lives. Everyday resistance is perceived to be the most common form of resistance to oppression. This particular form of resistance is a way of undermining power in a matter that is typically disguised or hidden. Everyday resistance (also, by James C. Scott, called infrapolitics) is a dispersed, quiet, seemingly invisible and disguised form of resistance seemingly aiming at redistribution of control over property. The acts of everyday resistance are considered to be relatively safe and they require either little or no formal coordination.

Everyday resistance can be understood as exploited, oppressed people undermining power as a way of surviving, holding onto their dignity and executing agency.

== Resistance ==
Defining resistance depends on interpretation and context. Activities described as resistance can alternatively be perceived as rebellion or even deviance. The oppositional act that is resistance is, like all acts, situated within certain relations with regards to a certain space and time. Resistance engages with various actors and takes different forms. Techniques, discourses and practices vary. Resistance can be understood as any mental or behavioral act in which an individual makes an attempt to stop, repel, prevent, expose, abstain from, withstand, work against or refuse to comply with, any form of oppression or violence.

== History ==
The concept was first introduced by James C. Scott in the year of 1985. By introducing the concept of everyday resistance, Scott was able to study how peasants resisted power in acts of everyday life. Studying a subaltern culture for the first time, that being one of peasants in South East Asia, Scott saw how small acts of resistance were being coordinated. Despite the concept originating from the study of peasants however, everyday resistance is not a peasant monopoly but rather a concept of all categories of subalterns.

== See also ==
- Civil resistance
- Class struggle
- Contentious politics
- Nonviolent resistance
- Social movement theory
- Weapons of the Weak
- Simple Sabotage Field Manual
- Work-to-rule
