= The Art of Not Being Governed =

2009 book by James C. Scott

- First edition
- Author: James C. Scott
- Publisher: Yale University Press
- Publication date: 30 September 2009
- Media type: Hardcover
- ISBN: 9780300152289 Also available in Paper (ISBN 9780300169171) and eBook

The Art of Not Being Governed: An Anarchist History of Upland Southeast Asia is a book by American anthropologist James C. Scott, published in 2009 and analyzing the high-altitude Zomia region of southeast Asia. Zomia's 100 million residents are minority peoples "of truly bewildering ethnic and linguistic variety", he writes, who have long avoided being ruled or dominated by surrounding empires, cultures or governments. Among them are the Akha, Hmong, Karen, Lahu, Mien, and Wa peoples.

== Argument ==
Zomia is a geographical term coined in 2002 by historian Willem van Schendel of the University of Amsterdam to refer to the huge mass of mainland Southeast Asia that has historically been beyond the control of governments based in the population centers of the lowlands.

As defined by Scott, Zomia includes all the lands above 300 meters, stretching from the Central Highlands of Vietnam to Northeastern India, encompassing parts of Vietnam, Cambodia, Laos, Thailand, and Myanmar, as well as four provinces of China. The region measures about 2.5 million square kilometers, roughly the size of Europe. For two thousand years, the disparate groups that now reside in Zomia have defied slavery, conscription, taxes, corvée, and other controls attempted by the nation state societies that surround them. This book is essentially an "anarchist history" which attempts to evaluate why people would deliberately choose to remain stateless.

Scott's main argument is that these people are "barbaric by design": their social organization, geographical location, subsistence practices and culture have been maintained to discourage states from curtailing their freedoms. States want to integrate Zomia peoples and territory to increase their landholdings, resources, and people subject to taxation: in other words, to raise revenue. Scott argues that these many minority groups in the Zomia region are "...using their culture, farming practices, egalitarian political structures, prophet-led rebellions, and even their lack of writing systems to put distance between themselves and the states that wished to engulf them." Tribes today do not live outside history according to Scott, but have "as much history as they require" and deliberately practice "state avoidance".

Scott admits to making "bold claims" in his book, but credits many other scholars, including the French anthropologist Pierre Clastres and the American historian Owen Lattimore, as influences.

== Reception ==
Scott's book triggered significant debate. Some academics argue that it reduces complexity to simplistic binaries between state evasion and state co-optation, or between freedom and oppression. Andrew Ong writes, however, that The Art of Not Being Governed acknowledges throughout that autonomy is not binary but rather a negotiated process of positioning and mutual adaptation. Others have recognized Scott's contribution to championing highland communities, while criticizing what they believe are his simplistic views of environmental determinism.

Recent empirical archaeological and historical evaluations of Scott's anthropological theory suggest that highlands in Southeast Asia were places of creative transformation, and could both resist states and also create new forms of social organization, including new cities and states. Historical as well as anthropological material also show how hill people were regularly attracted by the wealth of the plains, either raiding plains' villages or settling in lowlands.

== See also ==
- Stateless society
- Mainland Southeast Asia linguistic area
- Southeast Asian Massif
- Against the Grain: A Deep History of the Earliest States
