= Two Cheers for Anarchism =

2012 book-length defense of the anarchist perspective by James C. Scott

- Author: James C. Scott
- Subject: Philosophy
- Published: 2012 (Princeton University Press)
- Pages: 192
- ISBN: 978-0-691-15529-6

Two Cheers for Anarchism: Six Easy Pieces on Autonomy, Dignity, and Meaningful Work and Play is a 2012 book-length defense of the anarchist perspective, written by anthropologist James C. Scott and published by Princeton University Press.
