= James C. Scott =

American political scientist and anthropologist (1936–2024)

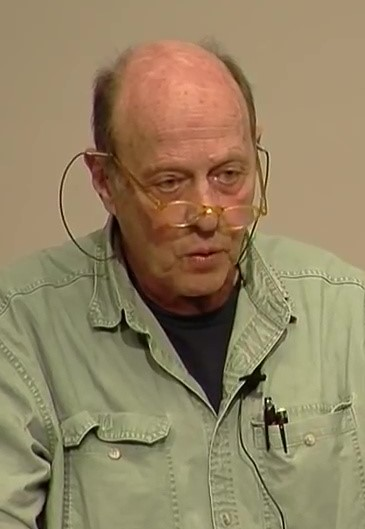
- Scott in 2016
- Born: James Campbell Scott; December 2, 1936; Mount Holly, New Jersey, U.S.
- Died: July 19, 2024 (aged 87); Durham, Connecticut, U.S.
- Education: Williams College (BA); Yale University (MA, PhD)
- Spouse: Louise Glover Goehring (m. 1961; died 1997)
- Partner: Anna Tsing (1999–2024; his death)
- Children: 3
- Scientific career
- Fields: Political science, anthropology
- Workplaces: University of Wisconsin; Yale University
- Thesis: Political Ideology in the New Nations: Generalizations from the Malaysian Experience (1968)
- Doctoral students: Julian Kuo; Ben Kerkvliet; Melissa Nobles; Erik Ringmar; John Sidel; Eric Tagliacozzo; Elizabeth F. Cohen; Jeffrey A. Winters; Mark R. Thompson

James Campbell Scott (December 2, 1936 – July 19, 2024) was an American political scientist and anthropologist specializing in comparative politics. He was a comparative scholar of agrarian and non-state societies.

Trained as a political scientist, Scott's scholarship discussed peasant societies, state power, and political resistance. From 1968 to 1985, Scott wrote influentially on agrarian politics in peninsular Malaysia. While he retained a lifelong interest in Southeast Asia and peasantries, his later works ranged across many topics: quiet forms of political resistance, the failures of state-led social transformation, techniques used by non-state societies to avoid state control, commonplace uses of anarchist principles, and the rise of early agricultural states.

Scott received his bachelor's degree from Williams College and his MA and PhD in political science from Yale. He taught at the University of Wisconsin–Madison until 1976 and then at Yale, where he was Sterling Professor of Political Science. In 1991, he became director of Yale's Program in Agrarian Studies. At the time of his death, The New York Times described Scott as among the most widely read social scientists.

== Biography ==
=== Early life ===
Scott was born in Mount Holly, New Jersey, on December 2, 1936. He grew up in Beverly, New Jersey. Scott attended the Moorestown Friends School, a Quaker Day School, and in 1953 matriculated at Williams College in Massachusetts. On the advice of Indonesia scholar William Hollinger he wrote an honors thesis on the economic development of Burma. Scott received his bachelor's degree from Williams College in 1958, and his PhD in political science from Yale University in 1967.

=== Career ===
Upon graduation, Scott received a Rotary International Fellowship to study in Burma, where he was recruited by an American student activist who had become an anti-communist organizer for the Central Intelligence Agency (CIA). Scott agreed to do reporting for the agency, and at the end of his fellowship, took a post in the Paris office of the National Student Association, which accepted CIA money and direction in working against communist-controlled global student movements over the next few years.

Scott began graduate study in political science at Yale in 1961, though originally intended to study economics. His dissertation on political ideology in Malaysia, which was supervised by Robert E. Lane, analysed interviews with Malaysian civil servants. In 1967, he took a position as an assistant professor in political science at the University of Wisconsin–Madison. His early work focused on corruption and machine politics.

As a Southeast Asia specialist teaching during the Vietnam War, he offered popular courses on the war and peasant revolutions. In 1976, having earned tenure at Madison, Scott returned to Yale and settled on a farm in Durham, Connecticut, with his wife. They started with a small farm, then purchased a larger one nearby in the early 1980s, where they sheared sheep and pastured Highland cattle.

Though Scott's early and late books were based on interviews and archival investigations, his use of ethnographic and interpretative methods has been influential. He is unusual for conducting his primary ethnographic fieldwork only after receiving tenure. To research his third book, Weapons of the Weak, Scott spent fourteen months in a village in Kedah, Malaysia between 1978 and 1980. When he had finished a draft, he returned for two months to solicit villagers' impressions of his depiction, and significantly revised the book based on their criticisms and insight.

In 2011, Scott, along with other Burmese and Western scholars, convened at Yale with the goal of re-establishing the Journal of the Burma Research Society for scholars. The journal's successor, named the Independent Journal of Burmese Scholarship (IJBS), published its first issue in August 2016.

Scott retired from teaching in 2022.

=== Personal life and death ===
In 1961, Scott married Louise Glover Goehring; they had three children and were married until her death in 1997. In 1999, he began a relationship with anthropologist Anna Tsing, which lasted until his death.

Scott lived in Durham, Connecticut. He died at his home on July 19, 2024, at the age of 87.

== Major works ==
Scott's work focuses on the ways that subaltern people resist domination.

=== The Moral Economy of the Peasant ===
During the Vietnam War, Scott took an interest in Vietnam and wrote The Moral Economy of the Peasant: Rebellion and Subsistence in Southeast Asia (1976) about the ways peasants resisted authority. Scott asserted that the highest priority for most peasants is ensuring that their incomes will not fall below minimal subsistence level. They desire higher income levels and will pursue them aggressively under some circumstances, but if their only path toward higher incomes is a gamble that might drop them below subsistence level if it did not work out, they will almost always reject that gamble.

Scott asserted that in traditional societies, many (though by no means all) peasants have relationships with the elite that provide some degree of assurance that the peasants will not fall below subsistence level. The peasants believe that elites are under a strong moral obligation to behave in a fashion that respects peasant needs (hence the phrase “moral economy” in his title), and they use such leverage as they have to persuade elites to do this. Elites are naturally less enthusiastic about this than peasants are. The processes of modernisation often reduce peasant leverage. When peasant leverage becomes inadequate, elites often abandon their traditional moral obligations. Peasants react with shock and outrage, sometimes with riot or rebellion.

Samuel Popkin, in his book The Rational Peasant (1979), wanting to refute some ideas he regarded as unfounded, made those ideas seem more influential than they were by 1) Saying that these were the ideas of a group he called the "moral economists." 2) Making it clear that he regarded Scott as the most conspicuous spokesman for the "moral economists." Popkin's "moral economists," unlike the actual James Scott, believed "that peasants have a fixed view of a proper income, that they will not strive to raise their income beyond that level, and that they are not interested in new forms of consumption." Popkin argued these "moral economists," romanticized the traditional elites, suggesting that the elites often would act benevolently without much regard for their own self-interest. Popkin gave an impression that he and Scott represented two radically different positions in the formalist–substantivist debate in political anthropology.

=== Weapons of the Weak ===
In Weapons of the Weak: Everyday Forms of Peasant Resistance (1985) Scott expanded his theories to peasants in other parts of the world. Scott's theories are often contrasted with Gramscian ideas about hegemony. Against Gramsci, Scott argues that the everyday resistance of subalterns shows that they have not consented to dominance.

=== Domination and the Arts of Resistance ===
In Domination and the Arts of Resistance (1990) Scott argues that subordinate groups employ strategies of resistance that go unnoticed. He terms this "infrapolitics". Scott describes the public interactions between dominators and oppressed as a "public transcript" and the critique of power that goes on offstage as a "hidden transcript". To illustrate how hidden forms of everyday resistance is contextually applied in high-risk contexts, including under Myanmar's authoritarian regime context, David Moe and James Scott examined "Reading Romans 13:1-7 as a Hidden Transcript of Public Theology." Their analysis demonstrates how ordinary peoples from the highlands and lowlands of Myanmar employ symbolic practices, everyday forms of hidden resistance, and acts of non-compliance to negotiate power, preserve moral agency, resilience, and articulate resistance without direct confrontation with dominant power. Groups under domination—from bonded labor to sexual violence—thus cannot be understood merely by their outward appearances. In order to study the systems of domination, careful attention is paid to what lies beneath the surface of evident, public behavior. In public, those that are oppressed accept their domination, but they always question their domination offstage. On the event of a publicization of this "hidden transcript," oppressed classes openly assume their speech and become conscious of its common status.

=== Seeing Like a State ===
Scott's book Seeing Like a State: How Certain Schemes to Improve the Human Condition Have Failed (1998) saw his first major foray into political science. In it, he showed how central governments attempt to force legibility on their subjects, and fail to see complex, valuable forms of local social order and knowledge. Scott argues that in order for schemes to improve the human condition to succeed, they must take into account local conditions, and that the high-modernist ideologies of the 20th century have prevented this. He highlights collective farms in the Soviet Union, the building of Brasília, and Prussian forestry techniques as examples of failed schemes.

=== The Art of Not Being Governed ===
In The Art of Not Being Governed (2009), Scott addresses the question of how certain groups in the mountainous jungles of Southeast Asia managed to avoid a package of exploitation centered around the state, taxation, and grain cultivation. Certain aspects of their society seen by outsiders as backward (e.g., limited literacy and use of written language) were in fact part of the "Arts" referenced in the title: limiting literacy meant lower visibility to the state. Scott's main argument is that these people are "barbaric by design": their social organization, geographical location, subsistence practices and culture have been carved to discourage states to annex them to their territories. Addressing identity in the Introduction, he wrote:

... All identities, without exception, have been socially constructed: the Han, the Burman, the American, the Danish, all of them ... To the degree that the identity is stigmatized by the larger state or society, it is likely to become for many a resistant and defiant identity. Here invented identities combine with self-making of a heroic kind, in which such identifications become a badge of honor ...

— The Art of Not Being Governed, pp. xii–iii

=== Against the Grain ===
Published in August 2017, Against the Grain: A Deep History of the Earliest States is an account of new evidence for the beginnings of the earliest civilizations that contradict the standard narrative. Scott explores why humanity avoided sedentism and plow agriculture; the advantages of mobile subsistence; the unforeseeable epidemics arising from crowding plants, animals, and grain; and why all early states are based on millets, cereal grains and unfree labor. He also discusses the "barbarians" who long evaded state control, as a way of understanding continuing tension between states and non-subject peoples.

=== Other works ===
In Two Cheers for Anarchism: Six Easy Pieces on Autonomy, Dignity, and Meaningful Work and Play (2012), Scott says that "Lacking a comprehensive anarchist worldview and philosophy, and in any case wary of nomothetic ways of seeing, I am making a case for a sort of anarchist squint. What I aim to show is that if you put on anarchist glasses and look at the history of popular movements, revolutions, ordinary politics, and the state from that angle, certain insights will appear that are obscured from almost any other angle. It will also become apparent that anarchist principles are active in the aspirations and political action of people who have never heard of anarchism or anarchist philosophy."

== Awards and fellowships ==
Scott was a Fellow of the American Academy of Arts and Sciences and was awarded resident fellowships at the Center for Advanced Study in the Behavioral Sciences, the Institute for Advanced Study, and the Science, Technology and Society Program at M.I.T. He also received research grants from the National Science Foundation, the National Endowment for the Humanities, and the Guggenheim Foundation, and was president of the Association for Asian Studies in 1997. In 2020 he was elected to the American Philosophical Society.

== Selected bibliography ==
(Note: Excludes edited volumes.)

- Political Ideology in Malaysia: Reality and the Beliefs of an Elite. Yale University Press, 1968.
- Comparative Political Corruption. Prentice-Hall, 1972 ISBN 978-0-13-179036-0
- The Moral Economy of the Peasant: Rebellion and Subsistence in Southeast Asia. Yale University Press, 1979 ISBN 978-0-300-01862-2
- Weapons of the Weak: Everyday Forms of Peasant Resistance. Yale University Press, 1985 ISBN 978-0-300-03336-6
- Domination and the Arts of Resistance: Hidden Transcripts. Yale University Press, 1990 ISBN 978-0-300-04705-9
- Seeing Like a State: How Certain Schemes to Improve the Human Condition Have Failed. Yale University Press, 1998 ISBN 978-0-300-07016-3
- The Art of Not Being Governed: An Anarchist History of Upland Southeast Asia. Yale University Press, 2009 ISBN 978-0-300-15228-9
- Two Cheers for Anarchism: Six Easy Pieces on Autonomy, Dignity, and Meaningful Work and Play. Princeton University Press, 2012 ISBN 978-0-691-15529-6
- Decoding Subaltern Politics: Ideology, Disguise, and Resistance in Agrarian Politics. Routledge, 2012 (Critical Asian scholarship; 8) ISBN 978-0-415-53975-3
- Against the Grain: A Deep History of the Earliest States. Yale University Press, 2017 ISBN 978-0-300-18291-0
- In Praise of Floods: The Untamed River and the Life It Brings. Yale University Press, 2025 ISBN 978-0-300-27849-1

== See also ==
- Societal collapse#Further reading – Fall of a complex human society
- Zomia (geography) – Geographical region in Southeastern Asia
