= Seeing Like a State =

Non-fiction book by James C. Scott

- Author: James C. Scott
- Language: English
- Publisher: Yale University Press
- Publication date: 1998
- Pages: 464
- ISBN: 9780300078152

Seeing Like a State: How Certain Schemes to Improve the Human Condition Have Failed is a book by James C. Scott critical of a system of beliefs he calls high modernism, that centers on governments' overconfidence in the ability to design and operate society in accordance with purported scientific laws.

The book makes an argument that states seek to force administrative legibility on their subjects by homogenizing them and creating standards that simplify pre-existing, natural, diverse social arrangements. Examples include the introduction of family names, censuses, uniform languages, and standard units of measurement. While such innovations aim to facilitate state control and economies of scale, Scott argues that the eradication of local differences and silencing of local expertise can have adverse effects.

The book was first published in March 1998, with a paperback version appearing in February 1999.

== Summary ==
Scott shows how central governments attempt to force (administrative) legibility on their subjects, and fail to see complex, valuable forms of local social order and knowledge. A main theme of this book, illustrated by his historic examples, is that states operate systems of power toward 'legibility' in order to see their subjects correctly in a top-down, modernist, model that is flawed, problematic, and often ends poorly for subjects. The goal of local legibility by the state is transparency from the top down, from the top of the tower or the center/seat of the government, so the state can effectively operate upon their subjects.

The book uses examples such the introduction of permanent last names in Great Britain, cadastral surveys in France, and standard units of measure across Europe to argue that a reconfiguration of social order is necessary for state scrutiny, and requires the simplification of pre-existing, natural arrangements. Whilst in earlier times a field could be measured in the amount of cows it could sustain or the types of plants it could grow, post centralization, its size is measured in hectares. This allows governors who have little to no local knowledge to immediately understand the outline of the area but simultaneously blinds the state to the complex interactions which happen within nature and society. In agriculture and forestry, for example, it led to monoculture, or the sole focus on cultivating a single crop or tree at the cost of all others. While monoculture is easy to measure, manage, and understand, it is also less resilient to ecological crises than polyculture is.

In the case of last names, Scott cites a Welsh man who appeared in court and identified himself with a long string of patronyms: "John, ap Thomas ap William" etc. In his local village, this naming system carried much information, because people could identify him as the son of Thomas and grandson of William, and thus distinguish him from the other Johns, the other children of Thomas, and the other grandchildren of William. Yet it was of less use to the central government, which did not know either Thomas or William. The court demanded that John take a permanent last name (in this case, the name of his village). This helped the central government keep track of its subjects, at the cost of a more nuanced yet fuzzy and less legible understanding of local conditions.

Schemes that successfully improve human lives, Scott argues, must take into account local conditions, and that the high-modernist ideologies of the 20th century have prevented this. He highlights collective farms in the Soviet Union, the building of Brasília, and forced villagization in 1970s Tanzania as examples of failed schemes which were led by top-down bureaucratic efforts and where officials ignored or silenced local expertise.

Scott takes great effort to highlight that he is not necessarily anti-state. At times, the central role played by the state is necessary for programs such as disaster response or vaccinations. That said, the flattening and standardization of knowledge which goes hand-in-hand with state centralization can have disastrous consequences whenever officials see their centralised knowledge as the only legitimate information that they should consider, thus ignoring more specialised but less clearly defined indigenous and local expertise.

== Reception ==
Stanford University political scientist David D. Laitin described it as "a magisterial book." But he said there were flaws in the methodology of the book, saying the book "is a product of undisciplined history. For one, Scott’s evidence is selective and eclectic, with only minimal attempts to weigh disconfirming evidence... It is all too easy to select confirming evidence if the author can choose from the entire historical record and use material from all countries of the world."

John N. Gray, author of False Dawn: The Delusions of Global Capitalism, reviewed the book favorably for the New York Times, concluding: "Today's faith in the free market echoes the faith of earlier generations in high modernist schemes that failed at great human cost. Seeing Like a State does not tell us what it is in late modern societies that predisposes them, against all the evidence of history, to put their trust in such utopias. Sadly, no one knows enough to explain that."

Economist James Bradford DeLong wrote a detailed online review of the book. DeLong's interpretation of the book was critiqued by Henry Farrell on the Crooked Timber blog, and there was a follow-up exchange including further discussion of the book.

Economist Deepak Lal reviewed the book for the Summer 2000 issue of The Independent Review, concluding: "Although I am in sympathy with Scott’s diagnosis of the development disasters he recounts, I conclude that he has not burrowed deep enough to discover a systematic cause of these failures. (In my view, that cause lies in the continuing attraction of various forms of 'enterprises' in what at heart remains Western Christendom.) Nor is he right in so blithely dismissing the relevance of classical liberalism in finding remedies for the ills he eloquently describes."

Political scientist Ulf Zimmermann reviewed the book for H-Net Online in December 1998, concluding: "It is important to keep in mind, as Scott likewise notes, that many of these projects replaced even worse social orders and at least occasionally introduced somewhat more egalitarian principles, never mind improving public health and such. And, in the end, many of the worst were sufficiently resisted in their absurdity, as he had shown so well in his, Weapons of the Weak and as best demonstrated by the utter collapse of the soviet system. "Metis" alone is not sufficient; we need to find a way to link it felicitously with—to stick with Scott's Aristotelian vocabulary—phronesis and praxis, or, in more ordinary terms, to produce theories more profoundly grounded in actual practice so that the state may see better in implementing policies."

Michael Adas, professor of history at Rutgers University reviewed the book for the Summer 2000 issue of the Journal of Social History.

Russell Hardin, a professor of politics at New York University, reviewed the book for The Good Society in 2001, disagreeing with Scott's diagnosis somewhat. Hardin, who believes in collectiveness (collective action) concluded: "The failure of collectivization was therefore a failure of incentives, not a failure to rely on local knowledge."

The September 2010 issue of Cato Unbound was devoted to discussing the themes of the book. Scott wrote the lead essay. Other participants were Donald Boudreaux, Timothy B. Lee, and J. Bradford DeLong. A number of people, including Henry Farrell and Tyler Cowen, weighed in on the discussion on their own blogs.

== See also ==
- Panopticism
