= The Moral Economy of the Peasant =

1976 book by James C. Scott

The Moral Economy of the Peasant: Rebellion and Subsistence in Southeast Asia
- Author: James C. Scott
- Publisher: Yale University Press
- Publication date: 1976
- Pages: 246

The Moral Economy of the Peasant: Rebellion and Subsistence in Southeast Asia is a 1976 book by James C. Scott on the nature of subsistence ethics in peasant cultures. He asserted that the highest priority for most peasants is ensuring that their incomes will not fall below minimal subsistence level. They desire higher income levels, and will pursue them aggressively under some circumstances, but if their only path toward higher incomes is a gamble that might drop them below subsistence level if it did not work out, they will almost always reject that gamble.

Scott asserted that in traditional societies, many (though by no means all) peasants have relationships with the elite that provide some degree of assurance that the peasants will not fall below subsistence level. The peasants believe that elites are under a strong moral obligation to behave in a fashion that respects peasant needs (hence the phrase “moral economy”), and they use such leverage as they have to persuade elites to do this. Elites are naturally less enthusiastic about this than peasants are. The processes of modernization often reduce peasant leverage. When peasant leverage becomes inadequate, elites often abandon their traditional moral obligations. Peasants react with shock and outrage, sometimes with riot or rebellion.

Scott cites two 1930s rebellions as examples: the Burmese Saya San Rebellion and the Vietnamese Nghệ-Tĩnh Soviets.

== Bibliography ==
- Anderson, Benedict R. (1977). "Review of The Moral Economy of the Peasant: Rebellion and Subsistence in Southeast Asia". The Journal of Asian Studies. 37 (1): 172–174. doi:10.2307/2053400. ISSN 0021-9118. JSTOR 2053400. S2CID 227310941.
- Beals, Ralph L. (1977). "Review of The Moral Economy of the Peasant: Rebellion and Subsistence in Southeast Asia". The Annals of the American Academy of Political and Social Science. 432: 161–162. ISSN 0002-7162. JSTOR 1042910.
- Devalle, Susana B. C. (1978). "Review of The Moral Economy of the Peasant. Rebellion and Subsistance in Southeast Asia". Estudios de Asia y Africa. 13 (1 (36)): 177–178. ISSN 0185-0164. JSTOR 40311837.
- Feeny, David (1978). "Review of The Moral Economy of the Peasant: Rebellion and Subsistence in Southeast Asia". The Journal of Economic History. 38 (2): 604–605. doi:10.1017/S0022050700106035. ISSN 0022-0507. JSTOR 2119922. S2CID 154419187.
- Gamer, Robert E. (1977). "Review of The Moral Economy of the Peasant: Rebellion and Subsistence in Southeast Asia". Social Science Quarterly. 58 (3): 515–516. ISSN 0038-4941. JSTOR 42859845.
- Hanisch, Rolf (1978). "Review of The Moral Economy of the Peasant". Verfassung und Recht in Übersee / Law and Politics in Africa, Asia and Latin America. 11 (2): 246. doi:10.5771/0506-7286-1978-2-246. ISSN 0506-7286. JSTOR 43108690.
- Klatt, W. (1977). "Review of The Moral Economy of the Peasant: Rebellion and Subsistence in Southeast Asia". International Affairs. 53 (3): 514–515. doi:10.2307/2615375. ISSN 0020-5850. JSTOR 2615375.
- Lev, Daniel S. (1977). "Review of The Moral Economy of the Peasant: Rebellion and Subsistence in Southeast Asia". The Journal of Politics. 39 (4): 1114–1115. doi:10.2307/2129954. ISSN 0022-3816. JSTOR 2129954.
- Marlay, Ross (1977). "Review of The Moral Economy of the Peasant: Rebellion and Subsistence in Southeast Asia". The Western Political Quarterly. 30 (3): 443–444. doi:10.2307/447954. ISSN 0043-4078. JSTOR 447954.
- Omvedt, Gail (1978). "Review of The Moral Economy of the Peasant: Rebellion and Subsistence in Southeast Asia". Contemporary Sociology. 7 (2): 166–167. doi:10.2307/2064685. ISSN 0094-3061. JSTOR 2064685.
- Pelzer, Karl J. (1978). "Review of The Moral Economy of the Peasant. Rebellion and Subsistence in Southeast Asia". Pacific Affairs. 51 (4): 686–688. doi:10.2307/2757279. ISSN 0030-851X. JSTOR 2757279.
- Perry, Elizabeth J. (1979). "Review of The Moral Economy of the Peasant: Rebellion and Subsistence in Southeast Asia". The American Political Science Review. 73 (2): 657–659. doi:10.2307/1954996. ISSN 0003-0554. JSTOR 1954996. S2CID 148079538.
- Williams, Michael C. (1978). "Review of The Moral Economy of the Peasant Rebellion and Subsistence in Southeast Asia". Journal of Southeast Asian Studies. 9 (1): 137–139. doi:10.1017/S0022463400009589. ISSN 0022-4634. JSTOR 20070250. S2CID 163754359.
- Young, Todd (1980). "Review of The Moral Economy of the Peasant: Rebellion and Subsistence in Southeast Asia". Humboldt Journal of Social Relations. 7 (2): 185–189. ISSN 0160-4341. JSTOR 23261740.
