= Moral economy =

Way of viewing economic activity

Moral economy is a way of viewing economic activity in terms of its moral, rather than material, aspects. The concept was developed in 1971 by British Marxist social historian and political activist E. P. Thompson in his essay, "The Moral Economy of the English Crowd in the Eighteenth Century". He referred to a specific class struggle in a specific era, seen from the perspective of the poorest citizens—the "crowd".

== History ==
According to Thompson, James Bronterre O'Brien introduced the term in his 1837 criticism of capitalism and of 19th century political economists. Bronterre wrote, "True political economy is like a true domestic economy; it does not consist solely in slaving and saving; there is a moral economy as well as political... These quacks would make wreck of the affections, in exchange for incessant production and accumulation... It is indeed the moral economy that they always keep out of sight. When they talk about the tendency of large masses of capital, and the division of labour, to increase production and cheapen commodities, they do not tell us of the inferior human being which a single and fixed occupation must produce."

Thompson first used the term in his 1963 book The Making of the English Working Class in reference to England's 1795 food riots. This "crowd" included "tinners, colliers, weavers, hosiery workers, and labouring people", regularly rioted against grain merchants and traders who raised their prices in lean years. The 1971 essay provided a description of the traditional feudal economy as "moral", in contrast to the "classical" (in the sense of an economy in which prices were determined by supply and demand). Thompson saw the "crowd" as active subjects, not passive objects.

He worked in the emerging discipline of social history, adopting the perspective of the crowd, rather than that of investors and business owners, crafting a "history from below" to explain why the crowd made the decision to riot. He concluded that they grieved the loss of their traditional livelihoods, facing hunger and/or starvation.

Thompson traced the root causes to the enclosure system that converted common lands into individually held plots, to merchants who raised prices in times of relative shortage, and to other practices that Thompson associated with freetrade, free markets, and limited regulation (laissez-faire) regulation that he identified with Adam Smith's 1776 book The Wealth of Nations.

Thompson explored how peasants' grievances reflected a popular consensus that economic activity should occur in accord with commonly held values. These included social norms, mutual obligations, and responsibilities. During industrialization, protective laws disappeared, and previously illegal activities became legal/common. Feudal peasants became industrial workers who experienced deprivation, and in extreme cases, starvation. Thompson said that the English riots were not just a response to physical hunger, but reflected public outrage against what rioters perceived to be the immorality of the new economic system.

Thompson re-defined and re-analyzed the concept. In his 1991 review of his 1971 article and its numerous critics, Thompson said that his use of the concept was set within that specific historical context.

== E. P. Thompson ==
Thompson described himself as an empiricist. Thompson's historical writing and his political engagement were linked. In the 1960s, he sided with the students in the student protests at his university, and in the 1980s, he was Europe's most well-known antinuclear activist.

He spent almost a decade gathering evidence for his 1971 Past & Present journal article "The Moral Economy of the Crowd in Eighteenth Century". The article was based on a collaborative project he had undertaken in 1963 with Richard Charles Cobb, who was working on 18th and 19th century protests in France.

Thompson's social history is associated with the phrase "history from below", (Note: Black and MacRaild wrote that Thompson's 1966 essay, 'History from below', in the Times Literary Supplement "was the real starting point, not only of the term, but of attempts to define it, to intellectualise about it, and to give it a coherent agenda..." Howard Zinn's 1980 book, A People's History of the United States introduced the concept to a wider audience.) like that of British social historians Raphael Samuel and Christopher Hill. Its antecedents were in Georges Lefebvre and the French Annales school. Previously, historians presented the peasants and working class "as one of the problems Government has had to handle".

In his 1964 book, The Crowd in History, George Rudé "explored the pattern of food riots and market disturbances in terms of their geographical distribution, frequency, level of violence". Thompson focused on the mindset of the 18th century crowd—used to the older, disintegrating economic system, which Thompson described as a moral economy—that paternalistically protected workers through crises and death, in return for authority over them. He contrasted this with the emerging system that broke that implicit compact.

Thompson investigated how in rural England in the 18th century, peasants made the decision to riot. He acknowledged that "riots were triggered off by soaring prices, by malpractices among dealers, or by hunger." However, he claimed that the riots were powered by the sense that old norms had been unjustly discarded and that the new ways were illegitimate, specifically referring to marketing, milling, and baking as examples. He defined the moral economy of the poor as "grounded upon a consistent traditional view of social norms and obligations, of the proper economic functions of several parties within the community." According to Thompson these riots were generally peaceable events demanding that the prices of essential goods be set according to traditional feudal rights. These peasants held that a traditional "fair price" was better than a market price and they punished large farmers who sold their surpluses at higher prices outside the village while needs remained within.

Thompson said that the riots were "legitimized by the assumptions of an older moral economy, which taught the immorality of... profiteering upon the necessities of the people". The riots were an effort by the protestors to re-establish the disintegrating Tudor policies of provision.

Norbert Götz examined Thompson's moral economy in relation to classical political economy. He claimed that Thompson "treated the concept as a neologism that had no prior history". In 1991, Thompson acknowledged that he did not coin it. He wrote that he thought that the term dated to at least the mid-18th century. Thompson cited Bronterre O'Brien's 1837 usage, which was similar to Thompson's. Götz wrote that in pre-capitalist England, the customary order had roots in both the Edwardian and Tudor eras and was based on market exchange.

Thompson's concept of moral economy was adopted by scholars from disciplines outside history, such as political science, sociology, and anthropology.

Thompson presented his work at an April 1966 conference. He described moral economy as a "traditional consensus of crowd rights that were swept away by market forces." Thompson contrasted the "bread-nexus" that emerged in the 18th century with the "cash-nexus" of the industrial revolution.

Prior to the eighteenth century rise of classical economics, European and colonial economies were governed by a variety of (formal and informal) regulations that had accumulated over time. In the older system, economic transactions were based on mutual obligation. Horwitz claimed that as markets for commodities developed in the second half of the 18th century, "the price of grain was no longer local, but regional; this [presupposed for the first time] the general use of money and a wide marketability of goods." This happened around the same time that organized markets were emerging and the economic system was transforming. Horwitz criticized late 18th century writers of contract law, such as John Joseph Powell, author of the 1790 "Essay upon the law of contracts and agreements", for denouncing the older systems for undermining the "rule of law". Horwitz claimed that the older systems were better ways of organizing contracts, as they were more "equitable conceptions of substantive justice".

Thompson claimed that the emerging political economy was epitomized by Smith's chapter, "Digression concerning the corn trade" in The Wealth of Nations. In this chapter Smith rejects the tax on corn exports, writing "The unlimited, unrestrained freedom of the corn trade, as it is the only effectual preventative of the miseries of a famine, so it is the best palliative of the inconveniences of a dearth; for the inconveniences of a real scarcity cannot be remedied, they can only be palliated." In other words, given that corn was in short supply, the question was who got to eat it, those who could pay or those who had eaten when it was abundant. This essay influenced many British leaders, including William Pitt the Younger, Lord Grenville, and Edmund Burke.

Thompson cited examples of British administrators sent to India who resisted government interventions in the market in spite of the "vast exigencies of Indian famine" during the Great Bengal famine of 1770. Amartya Sen estimated that approximately 10 million people died in the famine, which Sen described as manmade. In England, poor laws and charity protected many from starvation in the 18th century. For example, in 1795, the government enacted the Speenhamland system to address extreme poverty.

Thompson held that a community consensus agreed that rioters were "informed by the belief that they were defending traditional rights or customs." Patrick Collinson said in his chapter in the 2001 book Puritanism and the Poor that clergymen in the sixteenth and seventeenth century preached against economic practices that were not strictly illegal, but were "uncharitable". He said that, when the clergy condemned selling food at high prices or raising rents, it is possible that this influenced the behavior of Christians who were concerned about their reputations.

The 1991 compilation of Thompson's essays, Customs in Common, included the 1971 essay "The Moral Economy" along with his reflections on the article. In Marc Edelman's chapter "E. P. Thompson and Moral Economies", in the 2012 A Companion to Moral Anthropology, he wrote that Thompson's use of 'moral' conflates 'moral' as in 'mores' or customs with 'moral' as the principled stance—especially in terms of the "common good" as defined by "customary rights and utopian aspirations". In his reflection, Thompson wrote that "Maybe the trouble lies in the word 'moral'. Moral is a signal which brings on a rush of polemical blood to the academic head. Nothing had made my critics angrier than the notion that a food rioter might have been more 'moral' than a disciple of Dr. Adam Smith." Thompson attempted to clarify that his concept of moral economy was focused on a specific geographic, political, social, and temporal context. It included the combination of "beliefs, usages, and forms associated with the marketing of food" in 18th century England.

== James C. Scott ==
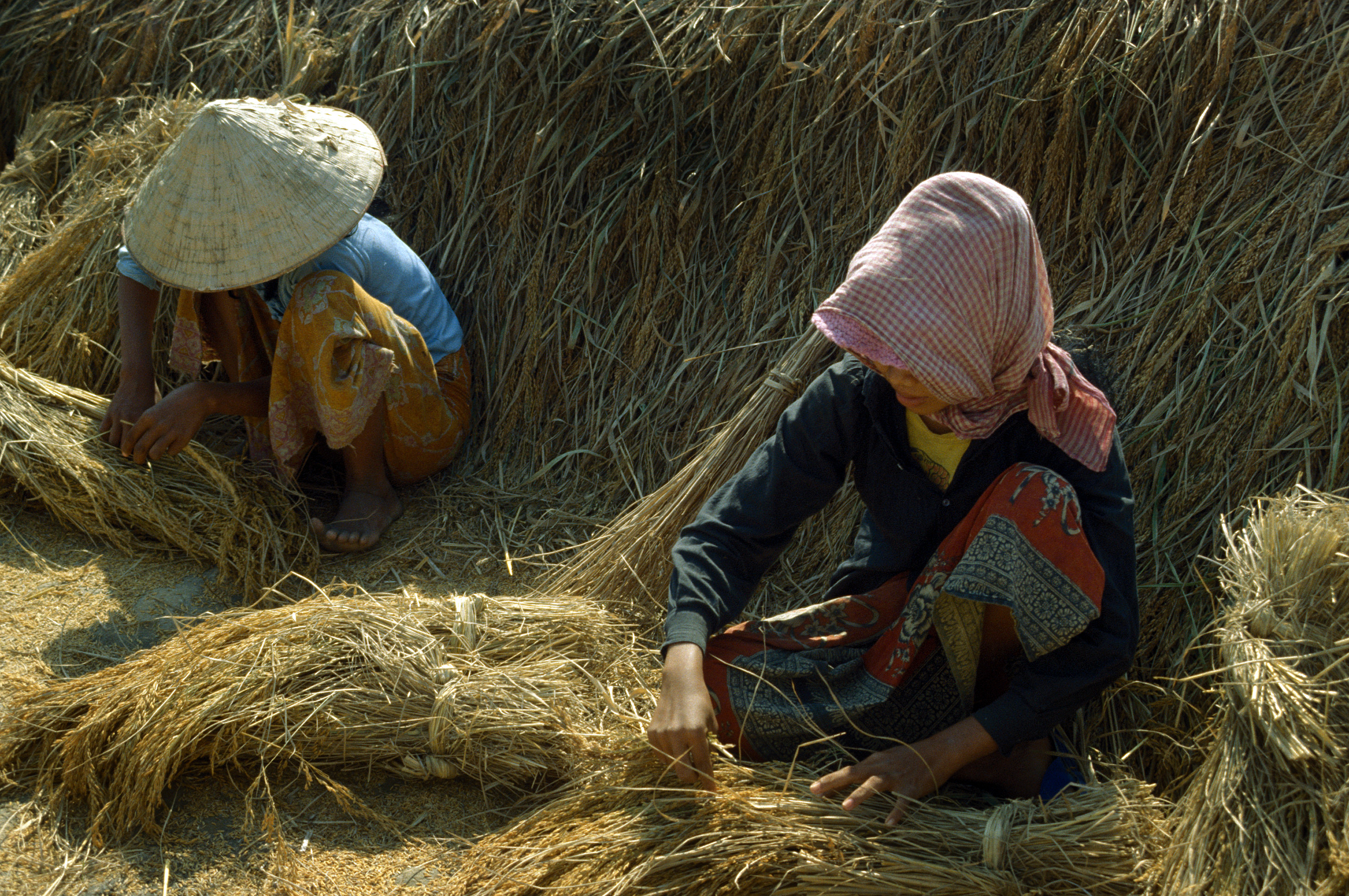
Cambodian rice farming

In the 1970s and 1980s political scientist James C. Scott revised Thompson's concept of moral economics. He applied it in his 1976 publication The Moral Economy of the Peasant: Rebellion and Subsistence in Southeast Asia. He studied colonial archives in Paris and London. He focused on colonization and decolonization in the peasant world of Burma and Vietnam, which included two unsuccessful 1930s uprisings. Scott reported that during the colonial era, economic and political transformations systematically violated what the lower classes perceived as social equity, and that this was an important cause of rebellions. Scott summarized peasant ideas of economic justice and exploitation as their moral economy and that violations of those norms led to revolts.

Scott credited Karl Polanyi's The Great Transformation as informing his own work. (Note: Polanyi did not use the term "moral economy". This was Scott's summary.)

Scott, citing Polanyi, described how farmers, tenants, and laborers invoked "moral economies or market logic" when it served their interests against market forces. The kind of market regulation they struggled with was informed by "historical origins and institutional structure of any particular economy".

In his introduction Scott described a "safety first subsistence ethic" that he observed. He claimed it was a consequence of precapitalist peasant societies enduring inadequate reserves and fearing food shortages.

Scott differentiated his views from those of Barrington Moore Jr., author of the 1966 Social Origins of Dictatorship and Democracy: Lord and Peasant in the Making of the Modern World, and Eric R. Wolf, author of the 1969 Peasant Wars of the Twentieth Century. Scott also cited Richard Charles Cobb, author The Police and the People: French Popular Protest 1789-1820 (1970).

== Beyond Thompson and Scott ==
The conclusions obtained by Russian-Soviet economist A.V. Chayanov largely coincide with the results of modern research. And despite the fact that A.V. Chayanov did not directly introduce the term 'moral economy' in his works in the 1910s-1930s, he largely prefigured its emergence, including the methodological aspects of the later research.

In the chapter, "The 'Moral Economy' of the English Crowd: Myth and Reality" John Stevenson criticized Thompson and the other British scholars who, he claimed, followed the lead of the French Annales school-historians, shifting away from traditional historiography. In his 1975 book, Stevenson was critical of Thompson for his attempt to decode peasant culture in the context of social and economic change. He rejected Thompson's concept of moral economy based on what Thompson called "extraordinary deep-rooted pattern of behaviour and belief" which legitimised their protests against the "propertied and those in authority".

In the 1998 book Moral Economy, John P. Powelson wrote: "In a moral economy [an economy that is morally acceptable], with today's technology no one should be poor… The moral economy captures the benefits of technological invention through classic liberalism while using sidewise checks and balances to prevent environmental damage, ethnic and gender bias, and distorted distributions of wealth... In the moral economy, governments facilitate but rarely mandate." Such an economy maintains a balance between interventionism and libertarianism; between economic factors and ethical norms. Powelson sees a moral economy and economic prosperity as mutually reinforcing.

Building on E.P. Thompson's affirmative notion of populism and Ernesto Laclau's observation that pre-industrial food riots provide 'a good starting point for an approach to populism' Norbert Götz and Emilia Palonen have identified the affective dimension, parochialism, and disregard for third parties as key affinities between moral economy and populism.

=== Moral Economy Project ===
The Quaker Institute for the Future (QIF), established in 2003, launched the Moral Economy Project. The project expanded the term to incorporate environmental concerns. The project was based on Kenneth Boulding's 1966 article, "The economics of the coming spaceship earth". Boulding advocated for an integrated, holistic, ecological worldview. The related 2009 publication, Right Relationship: Building a Whole Earth Economy, claimed that the well-being of the planet requires a "whole earth economy", which they also called a moral economy. The authors described a moral economy as ecologically and morally coherent resource use for the common good. The authors address purpose, function, size, fairness, and governance.

=== Others ===
Other works that invoke moral economy include:

- Steven Shapin's 2009 The Scientific Life: A Moral History of a Late Modern Vocation
- Götz, Siméant-Germanos, and Sandberg (2015)
- Götz and co-authors (2020)
- Sandberg (2015)
- Hodgson (2013),
- Sayer (2000)
- Heath (2001)
- Kelly (2008)

== Legacy ==
Thompson was described by Carlos Antonio Aguirre Rojas in 2020 as one of the "most important social thinkers of our age", whose work informed critical theory, alongside Karl Marx, Walter Benjamin, Fernand Braudel (who was highly influential in the Annales school), Mikhail Bakhtin, Carlo Ginzburg, and Immanuel Wallerstein.

In his 2017 book, The Moral Economists, Tim Rogan included Thompson in his trio of the 20th century's most influential critics of capitalism—along with Tawney and Polanyi because they were read widely, informed research, and influenced public opinion. All three were historians who challenged utilitarianism in economics as outsiders.

== See also ==
- Economic anthropology
- Free-rider problem
- Intentional community
- Just price
- Moral hazard
- Moral panic
- Non-market economics
- Perverse incentive
- Social dilemma
