= Chen Yan =

Chen Yan or Yan Chen may refer to the following people surnamed Chen:

- Chen Yan (governor) (died 891), governor of Fujian during the Tang dynasty
- Chen Yan (politician, born 1963), Chinese politician, mayor of Tongren, mayor of Guiyang, vice chairman of the Guizhou Provincial Committee of the Chinese People's Political Consultative Conference
- Chen Yan (writer) (born 1963), Chinese dramatist and novelist
- Yan Chen (economist) (born 1966), Chinese American behavioral and experimental economist
- Yan Chen (mechanical engineer), Chinese professor of mechanical engineering
- Chen Yan (swimmer, born 1979), female Chinese backstroke swimmer
- Chen Yan (swimmer, born 1981), female Chinese individual medley and freestyle swimmer
- Yan Chen (professor), short name of Qingyan Chen, Fellow of the Royal Society
