= Rachel Croson =

American economist

- Citizenship: United States
- Education: University of Pennsylvania (BA); Harvard University (MA, PhD)
- Spouse: David Croson
- Children: 2
- Awards: Carolyn Shaw Bell Award, American Economic Association 2017 Fellow, American Association for the Advancement of Science, 2021 Distinguished Service Award, American Economic Association 2024
- Scientific career
- Fields: Economics, Negotiation, Behavioral Operations Management
- Workplaces: University of Minnesota; Michigan State University; University of Texas at Arlington; National Science Foundation; University of Texas at Dallas; Wharton School
- Doctoral advisor: Jerry R. Green
- Website: https://provost.umn.edu/about-evpp/rachel-croson

Rachel Toni Algaze Croson is a McKnight Presidential Endowed Professor of Economics at the University of Minnesota. From March 2020 through July 2025 she also served as the Executive Vice President and Provost of the University of Minnesota system. Prior to March 2020, she served as Dean of the College of Social Science and MSU Foundation Professor of Economics at Michigan State University.

Her previous positions include Dean of the School of Business at the University of Texas at Arlington; Division Director of Social and Economic Sciences at the National Science Foundation; Director of the Negotiations Center, Professor of Economics, and Professor of Organizations, Strategy, and International Management at the University of Texas at Dallas. After receiving her Ph.D. she was Assistant and then Associate Professor (with tenure) in the Department of Operations and Information Management at the Wharton School and a member of the Psychology Graduate Group of the University of Pennsylvania.

== Research ==
Croson earned her bachelor's degree in economics and philosophy of science from the College of Arts & Sciences at University of Pennsylvania and her master's and Ph.D. in economics from the Graduate School of Arts & Sciences at Harvard University.

Croson's research focuses on experimental and behavioral economics; studying how people make economic decisions, what mistakes they make, and how to improve their performance.

This research draws from and contributes to multiple disciplines. Substantively her research has focused on the voluntary provision of public goods (especially public radio), bargaining and negotiation, behavioral operations management, and gender and cultural differences. She has served on the Editorial Boards of the American Economic Review, Organizational Behavior and Human Decision Processes, Management Science, Experimental Economics, and Journal of Economic Behavior and Organization. She was pivotal in creating and leading workshops to help female junior faculty in Economics advance through the profession, winning the Carolyn Shaw Bell Award from the American Economic Association (2017) and the American Economic Association Distinguished Service Award (2024) in recognition of her contributions. She was elected as a Fellow of the American Association for the Advancement of Science (AAAS) in 2021 and is appointed as a McKnight Presidential Endowed Professor in the Department of Economics at the University of Minnesota.

=== Selected works ===
- See Google Scholar page and Orcid profile

== Controversies ==
As Provost of the University of Minnesota, Croson received a vote of no-confidence from the Faculty Senate on June 26, 2024 due to her role in the rescission of a job offer to Raz Segal for the position of the director of the Center for Holocaust and Genocide Studies.
