= UC San Diego School of Global Policy and Strategy =

Public policy school of UC San Diego

University of California, San Diego School of Global Policy and Strategy
- Motto: "Driven to solve."
- Type: Public
- Established: 1986; 40 years ago
- Parent institution: UC San Diego
- Affiliations: APSIA
- Dean: Caroline Freund
- Students: 400
- Location: La Jolla, California, US; 32.884355°N 117.241149°W
- Website: gps.ucsd.edu

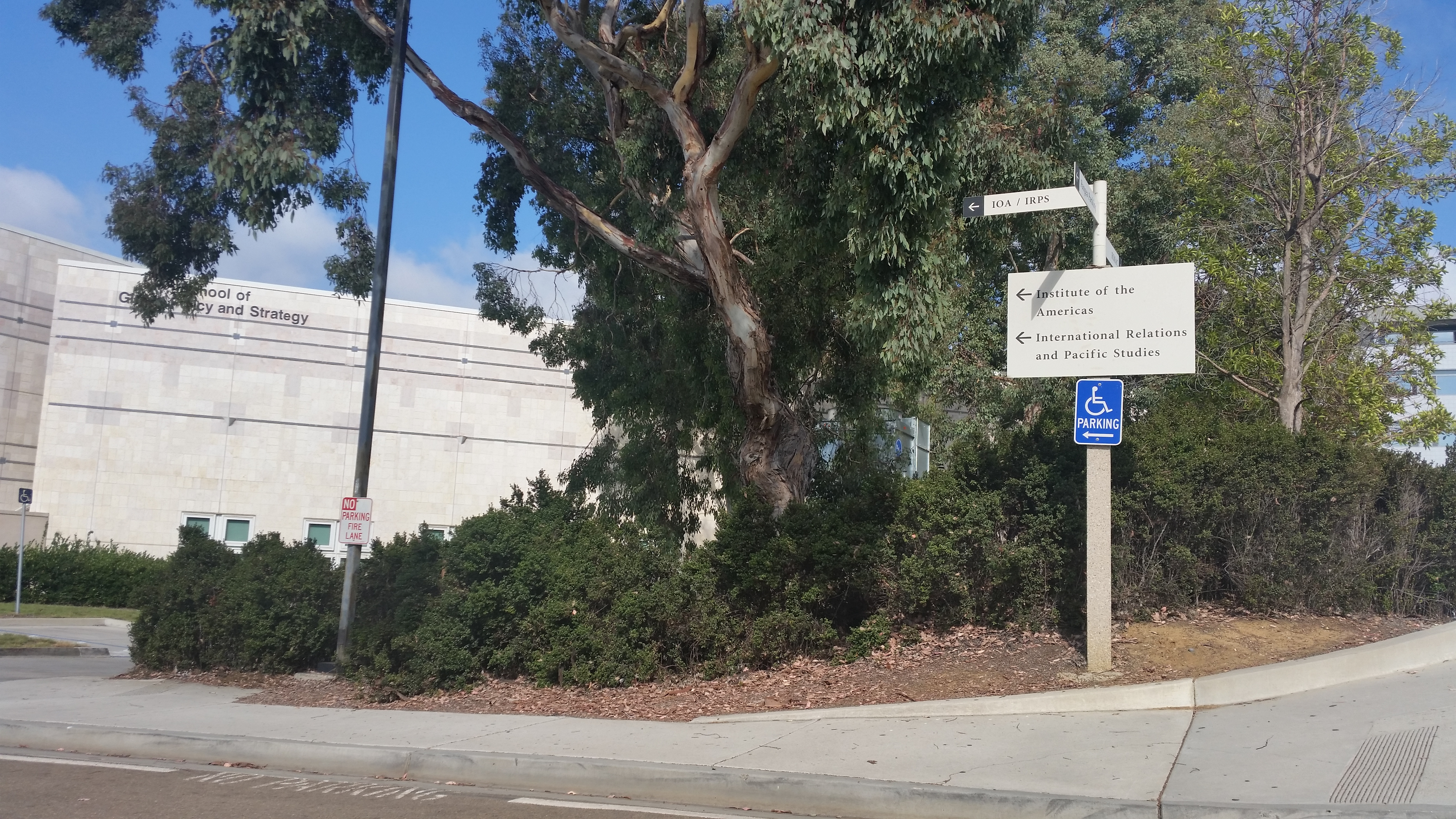
Southwest exterior of the school

The University of California, San Diego School of Global Policy and Strategy (GPS) is the school of international studies and public policy at the University of California, San Diego. It is a full member of the Association of Professional Schools of International Affairs.

== Prominent faculty ==
(Source)

- Caroline Freund - Dean of the UC San Diego School of Global Policy and Strategy, former Global Director of Trade, Investment and Competitiveness of the World Bank
- Peter Gourevitch - Political Scientist and Professor Emeritus
- Stephan Haggard - Lawrence and Sallye Krause Professor of Korea-Pacific Studies; Director, Korea-Pacific Program
- Lawrence B. Krause - International Economist and Professor Emeritus
- Barry Naughton - Professor of Chinese Economy; Sokwanlok Chair of Chinese International Affairs
- Ulrike Schaede - Professor of Japanese Business; Executive Director, Center on Emerging and Pacific Economies
- Susan L. Shirk - Ho Miu Lam Endowed Chair in China and Pacific Relations; Director of the Institute on Global Conflict and Cooperation (IGCC); Chair, 21st Century China Program
- Barbara F. Walter - Professor, Political Scientist, and member of the Council on Foreign Relations
- Emilie Hafner-Burton - John D. and Catherine T. MacArthur Professor of International Justice and Human Rights, Co-director, Laboratory on International Law and Regulation
- Gordon Hanson - Professor, Pacific Economic Cooperation Chair in International Economic Relations, Director on Global Transformation

== Journals ==
- Journal of East Asian Studies
