= Joyce P. Jacobsen =

American economist

- Born: Joyce Penelope Jacobsen; 27 May 1961 (age 65); Reno, Nevada
- Spouse: Bill Boyd
- Children: 2

Academic background
- Education: Harvard University (A.B.); Stanford University (Ph.D.)
- Doctoral advisor: Victor Fuchs

Academic work
- Discipline: Sex segregation, migration, and the effects of labor force intermittency on women’s earnings
- Institutions: Hobart and William Smith Colleges, Wesleyan University
- Awards: 2007 Binswanger Prize for Excellence in Teaching; 2021 Carolyn Shaw Bell Award
- Website: www2.hws.edu/president-jacobsen/biography/; Information at IDEAS / RePEc

Joyce Penelope Jacobsen is a former President of Hobart and William Smith Colleges. Dr. Jacobsen was elected as the 29th President of Hobart College and the 18th President of William Smith College. Jacobsen is a scholar of economics, an award-winning teacher and an experienced administrator. She began her presidency on July 1, 2019. She is the first woman to serve as president of Hobart and William Smith Colleges.

Jacobsen was the Andrews Professor of Economics at Wesleyan University, Middletown. She was also president of the International Association for Feminist Economics (IAFFE) from 2016 to 2017. In 2021, she was awarded the Carolyn Shaw Bell Award for furthering the status of women in the economics profession.

== Education ==
Jacobsen earned her A.B. from Harvard University in 1982 and her Ph.D. from Stanford University in 1991.

== Awards ==
- 2007 Binswanger Prize for Excellence in Teaching

== Bibliography ==
=== Books ===
- Jacobsen, Joyce P. (1982). Locational determinants of the U.S. insurance industry (A.B. thesis). Harvard University. OCLC 12190094.
- Jacobsen, Joyce P. (1991). Earnings and employment differences by race and sex, by economic sector (Ph.D. thesis). Stanford University. OCLC 38675868.
- Jacobsen, Joyce P.; Skillman, Gilbert L. (2004). Labor markets and employment relationships: a comprehensive approach. Malden, Massachusetts: Blackwell Publishing. ISBN 9780631208365.
- Jacobsen, Joyce P. (2007). The economics of gender (3rd ed.). Malden, Massachusetts: Blackwell Publishing. ISBN 9781405161824.
- Jacobsen, Joyce P.; Zeller, Adam (2008). Queer economics: a reader. London New York: Routledge. ISBN 9780203939451.

=== Chapters in books ===
- Jacobsen, Joyce P. (2008), "gender roles and division of labour", in Durlauf, Steven N.; Blume, Lawrence E. (eds.), The new Palgrave dictionary of economics (2nd ed.), Basingstoke, Hampshire New York: Palgrave Macmillan, p. 582, ISBN 9780333786765. Also available online.
- Jacobsen, Joyce P. (2013), "Closing the gender gap: what would it take?", in Rycroft, Robert S. (ed.), The economics of inequality, poverty, and discrimination in the 21st century (volume 1: causes), Santa Barbara, California: Praeger, pp. 177–193, ISBN 9780313396915.
- Jacobsen, Joyce P. (2013), "Gender inequality: a key global challenge –– Reducing losses due to gender inequality", in Lomborg, Bjørn (ed.), How much have global problems cost the world?: a scorecard from 1900 to 2050, Cambridge: Cambridge University Press, pp. 192–206, ISBN 9781107679337.
- Jacobsen, Joyce P. (2014), "Section 3: How did the great recession affect poverty rates for demographic groups?: Sex, female", in Hanson, Lindsey K.; Essenburg, Timothy J. (eds.), The new faces of American poverty: a reference guide to the great recession, Santa Barbara, California: ABC-CLIO, pp. 322–329, ISBN 9781610691826.
- Jacobsen, Joyce P. (2014), "Section 3: How did the great recession affect poverty rates for demographic groups?: Sex, male", in Hanson, Lindsey K.; Essenburg, Timothy J. (eds.), The new faces of American poverty: a reference guide to the great recession, Santa Barbara, California: ABC-CLIO, pp. 392–395, ISBN 9781610691826.
- Jacobsen, Joyce P. (2014), "Changing technologies of household productions: causes and effects", in Redmount, Esther (ed.), The economics of the family: how the household affects markets and economic growth (Volume 2), Santa Barbara, California: ABC-CLIO, pp. 141–169, ISBN 9781440800566

=== Journal articles ===
- Jacobsen, Joyce P. (May 1992). "Spillover effects from government employment". Economics Letters. 39 (1): 101–104. doi:10.1016/0165-1765(92)90109-C.Jacobsen, Joyce P.; Wishart Pearce III, James; Rosenbloom, Joshua L. (January 2001). "The effects of childbearing on married women's labor supply and earnings: using twin births as a natural experiment". Economics Letters. 70 (1): 133–138. doi:10.1016/S0165-1765(99)00210-4.
- Jacobsen, Joyce P.; Rayack, Wendy L. (May 1996). "Do men whose wives work really earn less?". The American Economic Review: Papers and Proceedings. 86 (2). American Economic Association: 268–273. JSTOR 2118135.
- Jacobsen, Joyce P.; Newman, Andrew E. (January 1997). "What data do economists use? The case of labor economics and industrial relations". Feminist Economics. 3 (2): 127–130. doi:10.1080/135457097338744.
- Jacobsen, Joyce P.; Wishart Pearce III, James; Rosenbloom, Joshua L. (Summer 1999). "The effects of childbearing on married women's labor supply and earnings: using twin births as a natural experiment" (PDF). Journal of Human Resources. 34 (3): 449–474. doi:10.2307/146376. JSTOR 146376. S2CID 152937510.
- Jacobsen, Joyce P. (1999). "Labor force participation". The Quarterly Review of Economics and Finance. 39 (5): 597–610. doi:10.1016/S1062-9769(99)00020-4.
- Jacobsen, Joyce P.; Levin, Laurence M. (May 2000). "The effects of internal migration on the relative economic status of women and men". The Journal of Socio-Economics. 29 (3): 291–304. doi:10.1016/S1053-5357(00)00075-5. (The journal has since been renamed: The Journal of Behavioral and Experimental Economics.)
- Jacobsen, Joyce P. (December 2001). "Modeling and measurement of transitions between income categories". Social Science Quarterly. 82 (4): 676–679. doi:10.1111/0038-4941.00051. JSTOR 42955752.
- Jacobsen, Joyce P.; Levin, Laurence M. (June 2002). "Calculation of returns to job tenure revisited". Applied Economics Letters. 9 (7): 473–477. doi:10.1080/13504850110097385. S2CID 154323700.
- Jacobsen, Joyce P.; Freccia, David M.; Kilby, Peter (Spring 2003). "Exploring the relationship between price and quality for the case of hand-rolled cigars". The Quarterly Review of Economics and Finance. 43 (1): 169–189. doi:10.1016/S1062-9769(01)00131-4.
- Jacobsen, Joyce P.; Kooreman, Peter (January 2005). "Timing constraints and the allocation of time: The effects of changing shopping hours regulations in The Netherlands" (PDF). European Economic Review. 49 (1): 9–27. doi:10.1016/j.euroecorev.2004.03.008. hdl:10419/20575. S2CID 4991609. SSRN 592342.
- Jacobsen, Joyce P.; Robb, Robert Edgecombe; Burton, Jonathan; Blackaby, David H.; Humphries, Jane; Joshi, Heather; Wang, Xiaobo; Dong, Xiao-yuan (July 2006). "Introduction / The status of women economists in US universities and the world / The status of women economists in UK universities / The status of women economists in Canadian universities / The status of women economists in China's universities". Feminist Economics. 12 (3): 427–474. doi:10.1080/13545700600669667. S2CID 154406329.
- Jacobsen, Joyce P. (April 2007). "Law and economics: alternative economic approaches to legal and regulatory issues". Feminist Economics. 13 (2): 224–226. doi:10.1080/13545700601184922. S2CID 154993390.
- Jacobsen, Joyce P.; Kooreman, Peter (April 2007). "A human capital-based theory of postmarital residence rules" (PDF). Journal of Law, Economics, & Organization. 23 (1): 208–241. doi:10.1093/jleo/ewm009. SSRN 1146879.
- Jacobsen, Joyce P.; Baker, Matthew J. (October 2007). "Marriage, specialization, and the gender division of labor" (PDF). Journal of Labor Economics. 25 (4): 763–793. doi:10.1086/522907. JSTOR 10.1086/522907. S2CID 23771454.
- Jacobsen, Joyce P.; Skillman, Gilbert L. (Winter 2007). "Dialogue: time to eliminate the penny?: Introduction". Eastern Economic Journal. 33 (1): 137–138. doi:10.1057/eej.2007.9. JSTOR 20642336.
- Jacobsen, Joyce P.; Skillman, Gilbert L. (Fall 2007). "Dialogue: is new classical economics a false path or an illuminating complement to Keynesian economics?: Introduction". Eastern Economic Journal. 33 (4): 539–540. doi:10.1057/eej.2007.39. JSTOR 20642376.
- Jacobsen, Joyce P.; Skillman, Gilbert L. (Winter 2009). "Introduction: 35th anniversary issue of the "Eastern Economic Journal"". Eastern Economic Journal. 35 (1): 1. doi:10.1057/eej.2008.38. JSTOR 20642457.
- Jacobsen, Joyce P.; Levin, Laurence M.; Tausanovitch, Zachary (30 March 2015). "Comparing standard regression modeling to ensemble modeling: how data mining software can improve economists' predictions" (PDF). Eastern Economic Journal. 41 (2): 387–398. doi:10.1057/eej.2015.8. S2CID 154334929.
- Jacobsen, Joyce P.; Khamis, Melanie; Yuksel, Mutlu (30 March 2015). Convergences in men's and women's life patterns: lifetime work, lifetime earnings, and human capital investment. Vol. 41. Emerald Group Publishing and Institute for the Study of Labor. pp. 1–33. doi:10.1108/S0147-912120140000041008. hdl:10419/102331. ISBN 9781784414566. S2CID 155525217. (Edited by: Solomon W. Polachek; Konstantinos Tatsiramos; and Klaus F. Zimmermann.)

== See also ==
- International Association for Feminist Economics

Non-profit organisation positions
Preceded by Şemsa Özar	President of the International Association for Feminist Economics; 2016–2017	Succeeded by Silvia Berger
