= Fraumeni =

Fraumeni is an Italian surname. Notable people with the surname include:

- Barbara Fraumeni (born 1949), American economist
- Joseph F. Fraumeni Jr. (born 1933), American physician and cancer researcher

== See also ==
- Giacobbe Fragomeni
