= Bell Awards =

Bell Awards may refer to:

- Australian Jazz Bell Awards - music awards for the jazz music genre in Australia.
- Bell Awards for Publishing Excellence - an Australian Publishing Industry award list.
- Bert Bell Award - for the Professional American football Player of the Year.
- Carolyn Shaw Bell Award - given by the American Economic Association to economists who promote the success of women in the economics profession
- Grand Bell Awards - film awards presented in South Korea
