= Catherine C. Eckel =

American economist

- Citizenship: United States
- Education: Virginia Commonwealth University; University of Virginia
- Awards: Carolyn Shaw Bell Award, 2012
- Scientific career
- Fields: Economics
- Workplaces: University of British Columbia; Virginia Tech; University of Texas at Dallas; Texas A&M University
- Doctoral advisor: Roger Sherman
- Website: https://sites.google.com/site/eckelcatherine/

Catherine Millay Coleman Eckel is an American economist who is the Sarah and John Lindsey Professor in the Liberal Arts and University Distinguished Professor in the Department of Economics at Texas A&M University, where she directs the Behavioral Economics and Policy Program. She has been a faculty member at the University of British Columbia, Virginia Tech, and the University of Texas at Dallas, where she founded and oversaw the Center for Behavioral and Experimental Economic Science. Her research focuses on experimental economics, and she has studied charitable giving; cooperation, trust, and risk tolerance in poor, urban settings; the coordination of counter-terrorism policy; gender differences in preferences and behavior; and discrimination by race and gender as evidenced in games of trust. She was a past president of the Economic Science Association and a past president of the Southern Economic Association. She has served as a program director for the National Science Foundation, an editor of the Journal of Economic Behavior and Organization (2005–2012), and has served as associate editor or on the editorial boards of twelve journals.
