= Caroline Freund =

American economist

Dean of UC San Diego School of Global Policy and Strategy
- Incumbent
- Assumed office July 2021
- Preceded by: Peter F. Cowhey

Personal details
- Education: Bowdoin College (BA); Columbia University (PhD)
- Occupation: Economist
- Scientific career
- Fields: Economic theory
- Thesis: Preferential trade agreements and imperfect competition (1997)

Caroline Louise Freund is an American economist, currently serving as dean of the School of Global Policy and Strategy at the University of California, San Diego since July 2021. She is also a nonresident senior fellow at the Peterson Institute for International Economics.

== Education and career ==
Freund received a Bachelor of Arts with a major in mathematics and economics from Bowdoin College in Maine in 1988 and a Doctor of Philosophy in economics from Columbia University in 1997. Her doctoral dissertation was in economic theory, titled Preferential trade agreements and imperfect competition (1997).

Freund held three positions at the World Bank: Senior Economist in the Development Research Group for International Trade from 2002 to 2009, Lead Economist in the same group from 2009 to 2011, and Chief Economist for the Middle East and North Africa from 2011 to 2013. She is also a nonresident senior fellow at the Peterson Institute for International Economics.

On March 29, 2021, the University of California, San Diego announced that it had appointed Freund as the incoming dean of the university's School of Global Policy and Strategy, succeeding Peter F. Cowhey, effective July 1, 2021.
