= The Chinese Economy: Transitions and Growth =

2007 nonfiction book by Barry Naughton

- Author: Barry Naughton
- Language: English
- Genre: Non-fiction
- Publisher: MIT Press
- Publication date: 2007
- Publication place: United States
- Pages: 520

The Chinese Economy: Transitions and Growth is a nonfiction 520+ page book written by Barry Naughton and is published by the MIT Press, originally in 2007. The book is accessible for the general reader and can be used as a college level course textbook for undergraduate and graduate studies. It is a methodical and historically accurate English language account of the decades-long market-based reorganization of the Chinese economy since its beginnings in 1978.

== Overview ==
The first three chapters briefly discuss China's geography, the Chinese economy before 1949, the socialist centrally planned command structure from 1949 to 1978, and a short analysis of the reform and opening up period that began in 1978. Then, beginning with Chapter 4, topics are narrowly defined by economic sector and discussed in greater detail. However, the book is meant to be only an introduction to the topics covered.

Part II covers changes in GDP including graphs and statistics, and also covers people's place in the economy, such as human capital in education and the labor force, income inequality, and poverty. Part III focuses on the rural Chinese economy since 1978, including its organization and the impact of technology. Part IV focuses on the urban economy and its changes over time. Part V and VI covers China's interrelationship with the world economy.
