= Silvia Berger (economist) =

Argentine economist

- Website: www.iaffe.org/pages/about-iaffe/board-members/silvia-berger/

Silvia Berger works at the Ministry of Economics and Production in Argentina, Latin American Council of Social Sciences (CLACSO), and is a post-graduate university teacher at the Latin American Social Sciences Institute (Facultad Latinoamericana de Ciencias Sociales or FLACSO). and past president of the International Association for Feminist Economics (IAFFE), her tenure was from 2017 to 2018. 7 Berger is a member of the editorial committee for the Mexican journal Ola Financiera.

== Bibliography ==
=== Books ===
- Berger, Silvia (1995). Mujeres en sus puestos: clases sociales y oferta de trabajo en la reestructuración del capitalismo argentino [Women in their posts: social classes and job offer in the restructuring of Argentine capitalism] (in Spanish). Buenos Aires, Argentina: FLACSO. OCLC 35114074.
- Berger, Silvia, ed. (2003). Inequidades, pobreza y mercado de trabajo: Bolivia y Perú (PDF). Colección GPE-AL series (in Spanish). Lima, Peru: Oficina Regional de la OIT para América Latina y el Caribe. ISBN 9789223153564.

=== Chapters in books ===
- Berger, Silvia (2009), "Globalización, exclusión e inserción en la economia mundial", in Girón, Alicia (ed.), Género y globalización [Gender and globalization] (in Spanish), Buenos Aires, Argentina: CLACSO, pp. 53–76, ISBN 9789871543168. Pdf (in Spanish).
- Berger, Silvia (2010), "América Latina, la crisis y el feminismo. Pensando junto con Nancy Fraser", in Girón, Alicia (ed.), Crisis económica: una perspectiva feminista desde América Latina [Economic crisis: a feminist perspective from Latin America] (in Spanish), Buenos Aires, Argentina: CLACSO, pp. 113–136, ISBN 9789801241546. Pdf (in Spanish).
- Berger, Silvia (2012), "La Argentina oligárquica agroexportadora y los cambios en el orden de género", in Carosio, Alba (ed.), Feminismo y cambio social en América Latina y el Caribe [Feminism and social change in Latin America and the Caribbean] (in Spanish), Ciudad de Buenos Aires, Argentina: CLACSO, pp. 179–206, ISBN 9789871891078. Pdf (in Spanish).

=== Journal articles ===
- Berger, Silvia (January–July 1998). "Evolución regional del mercado de trabajo argentino: Cambios en la década de 1990". Estudios del Trabajo. 15. Asociación Argentina de Especialistas en Estudios del Trabajo (ASET): 3–27. Full text in Spanish (abstract in English).

=== Other ===
- Berger, Silvia (2008). Gender in pheripherical countries (speech to IAFFE conference) (pdf). Conference Maker, Technoluddites Inc.

== See also ==
- International Association for Feminist Economics

Non-profit organisation positions
Preceded by Joyce P. Jacobsen	President of the International Association for Feminist Economics; 2017–2018	Succeeded by Naila Kabeer
