= Carolyn Shaw Bell =

Economics professor

- Bell in 1986
- Born: June 21, 1920; Framingham, Massachusetts
- Died: May 13, 2006 (aged 85); Arlington, Virginia
- Education: Mount Holyoke College; London School of Economics
- Known for: Mentoring American women economists
- Awards: Honorary doctorate from Denison University, 1988; The Carolyn Shaw Bell Award of the American Economic Association is named in her honor
- Scientific career
- Fields: Economics
- Workplaces: Wellesley College

Carolyn Shaw Bell (June 21, 1920 – May 13, 2006) was the Katharine Coman professor in economics at Wellesley College known for her mentorship of her own students' careers, as well as mentorship of female economists more broadly, through the efforts of the Committee on the Status of Women in the Economics Profession, of which she was founding chair.

The Carolyn Shaw Bell Award, also called the “Bell Award”, given by the American Economic Association each year since 1998 to economists who promote the success of women in the profession, is named for her.

== Personal life and education ==
Bell grew up in Framingham, Massachusetts and studied economics at Mount Holyoke College. She married, and at the end of the war, both she and her husband moved to London for graduate school. She completed her doctorate at the London School of Economics in 1949, and, newly divorced and the mother of a young daughter, returned to live with her parents. She took a job at nearby Wellesley College.

In 1953, she married Nelson Bell, a Wellesley, Massachusetts small business owner. The couple were known for entertaining Wellesley students, and her students were inspired by her example of having both a family and a successful career.

== Career ==
=== Employment ===
She took a job as an assistant to John Kenneth Galbraith at the federal Office of Price Administration, responsible for price controls during World War II, after graduating from Mount Holyoke College. She took at job at Wellesley College after receiving her doctorate at the London School of Economics. Bell retired from teaching in 1989, due to hearing loss, but continued writing columns for The Boston Globe until the year 2000.

=== Author and researcher ===
Bell wrote two books on consumer economics, Consumer Choice in the American Economy (1967) and The Economics of the Ghetto (1970), as well as numerous journal articles on human capital, income distribution and the economic data. In her role as the founding chair of the Committee on the Status of Women in the Economics Profession for the American Economic Association she began surveys of women in the economics profession that continue to the present day.

==== Selected works ====
- Bell, Carolyn Shaw (1967). Consumer Choice in the American Economy. New York: Random House. OCLC 174518.
- Bell, Carolyn Shaw (1975). Alternatives for social change : the future status of women. OCLC Number:56604386. OCLC 56604386.
- Bell, Carolyn Shaw (1972). Age, sex, marriage, and jobs. Massachusetts: Wellesley College Dept of Economics. OCLC 38826140.
- Bell, Carolyn Shaw (1974). Economics, sex, and gender : an attempt to explain, to social scientists and others how economics deals with women. Massachusetts: Wellesley College Dept of Economics. OCLC 660194756.
- Bell, Carolyn Shaw (1979). Minimum Wage and Personal Income. Massachusetts: Department of Economics, Wellesley College. OCLC 713120075.

=== Mentorship ===
Bell encouraged many of her Wellesley female students to pursue careers in economics and business, and to tell later students about their successes. Along with fellow economics professor Marshall Goldman, she started the "FEM files." These referred to "Former Economics Majors," with whom she kept in touch, and asked to describe their experiences to other alumnae of the department. Her encouragement, and the network of alumnae she mentored, helped Wellesley graduates succeed. The model she established sent a disproportionate number of Wellesley graduates into careers in economics and business. At least 58 of her students received doctorates in economics while she was a professor at Wellesley, and another 30 were enrolled in such programs at the time of her retirement.

=== Advancing women in economics ===
After a group of graduate students, including Francine Blau and Heidi Hartmann, demanded to know why so few female economists were on the program for the American Economic Association Annual Meetings in 1971, Bell undertook a survey of all the employed female members of the AEA who had completed their graduate degrees at least ten years prior, to demonstrate to AEA president Kenneth Arrow the number of female economists willing and able to present papers at these meetings. Bell was then named chair of a new Committee on the Status of Women in the Economics Profession (CSWEP). Under her leadership CSWEP began surveying graduate programs in economics to find out the numbers of female graduate students and female faculty, to demonstrate the numbers of qualified women for positions in economics. The committee's pressure also led to changes in the job market for economists from networks of male professors to open hiring, including the publication of "Job Openings for Economists", a public listing of open positions in the field.

== The Carolyn Shaw Bell Award ==
In January 1998, as part of the 25th anniversary of CSWEP, the American Economic Association established an annual award named for Carolyn Shaw Bell, the Carolyn Shaw Bell Award, also called the “Bell Award”, given to economists who promote the success of women in this profession. This award has been presented to:
1998: Alice M. Rivlin
1999: Sandra Ohrn Moose
2000: Eva Mueller
2001: Marianne Ferber
2002: Margaret Garritsen de Vries
2003: Robin L. Bartlett
2004: Barbara Bergmann
2005: Claudia Goldin
2006: Barbara Fraumeni
2007: Olivia S. Mitchell
2008: Anne Carter
2009: Elizabeth E. Bailey
2010: Elizabeth Hoffman
2011: Sharon Oster
2012: Catherine C. Eckel
2013: Rachel McCulloch
2014: Hilary Hoynes
2015: Janet Currie
2016: Cecilia Rouse
2017: Rachel Croson
2018: Rohini Pande
2019: Yan Chen
2020: Nancy Rose
2021: Joyce P. Jacobsen
2022: Martha Bailey
2023: Kaye Husbands Fealing
2024: Sandra Black
