= The Candidate: What it Takes to Win – and Hold – the White House =

2013 book By Samuel Popkin

- Cover
- Author: Samuel L. Popkin
- Language: English
- Subject: American political campaigns
- Publisher: Oxford University Press
- Publication date: 24 October 2013
- Publication place: United States
- Media type: Print (paperback), digital (ebook)
- Pages: 360
- ISBN: 9780199325214

The Candidate: What it Takes to Win – and Hold – the White House is a 2013 book by American political scientist Samuel L. Popkin. Popkin studies the factors behind successful U.S. presidential campaigns, based on his research and campaign experience. He uses case studies, including George H.W. Bush's 1992 re-election bid, Al Gore's 2000 run, and Hillary Clinton's 2008 primary effort, to illustrate how challengers, incumbents, and successors navigate the election process. The book was widely used by political operatives, including Republicans, for its clear framework on strategic adaptation and campaign management—a set of lessons on what distinguishes winning campaigns from losing ones. Although Popkin is a Democrat his books were widely read and used in Republican campaigns, even required read and distributed by Karl Rove in the W Bush campaigns. The book prompted James Fallows, former editor of The Atlantic, to do a series of articles, titled "Ask Doctor Popkin", that drew hundreds of thousands of views.

== Background ==
In a 2012 interview with the University of California Television (UCTV), Popkin said that the book drew on his firsthand involvement in multiple presidential campaigns and detailed extensive research in archives, as well as interviews with Republicans about presidential campaigns since World War II. He explained that it examined the distinct strategies of incumbents, challengers, and successors by illustrating how each type faced unique challenges in persuading voters. He mentioned that one of its central arguments warned against relying too heavily on a candidate's résumé instead of examining how effectively that candidate ran the campaign. Popkin emphasized that voters often judged competence by observing the organization and decisions made throughout the race, and demonstrated how campaign success depended on addressing inherent weaknesses and presenting a coherent vision for change or continuity.

== Overview ==
Popkin presents a framework for understanding why some U.S. presidential campaigns succeed and others fall short. He begins by demonstrating the recurring pattern of "inevitable" front-runners who later stumble, contrasting popular assumptions about clear favorites with the realities of campaign strategy. Early sections introduce the core idea that presidential hopefuls simultaneously juggle three roles—performing as public figures, shaping a guiding vision, and directing an extensive campaign operation. Popkin examines how challengers, incumbents, and designated successors face distinct sets of opportunities and vulnerabilities.

The book emphasizes that presidential candidates face fundamentally different roles depending on whether they are challengers, incumbents, or successors. Challengers must demonstrate readiness and offer a fresh vision, incumbents must defend a track record while adapting to new political realities, and successors must balance continuity with innovation. Popkin argues that understanding and adapting to these structural roles is critical to electoral success.

Further chapters develop these themes by tracing real-life examples, including George H.W. Bush's quest for a second term in 1992 and Hillary Clinton's run for the Democratic nomination in 2008, and by looking at Al Gore's effort to sustain a party legacy in 2000. Popkin describes the varied pressures that arise from balancing personal authenticity, policy commitments, and organizational demands, and he devotes later segments to team dynamics and the nature of management under extreme stress. He also reflects on the factors that make this process uniquely demanding, and outlines the structural and personal elements that shape presidential elections.

== Reviews ==
Former White House press secretary to President Bill Clinton, Mike McCurry, praised the book as a well-written mix of personal experience and political analysis, a study of how presidential campaigns function under pressure. McCurry appreciated the insights into the roles of candidate authenticity, team cohesion, and message clarity, noting that the author effectively explained why certain campaigns succeeded while others faltered. He stressed Popkin's use of metaphors—comparing candidates to ship captains and dancers—as memorable ways of framing the demands of campaigning. McCurry also lauded the practical tools discussed, such as the "message box", and noted how well the author applied these concepts to historical and recent campaigns.

Adam Kirsch said the book would appeal to political enthusiasts with its mix of case studies, practical insights, and insider anecdotes. Kirsch praised the material for showing why a successful run for high office requires humility and an ability to face criticism, arguing that these qualities are tested by the grueling political process. He concluded that the system, despite its flaws, outperforms older methods in selecting presidents.

In his review, Michael Tomasky appreciated how the book updated and applied Popkin's earlier insights (notably from The Reasoning Voter) to the 2008 campaign, especially the argument that gaffes and details of candidate style and rhetoric indeed mattered. Tomasky said that he'd been familiar with Popkin's work since graduate school. He found two points particularly valuable: first, Popkin's explanation of how Obama's more inclusive language and nimbler operation helped him defeat Hillary Clinton in the Democratic primaries; and second, his contention that the single biggest determinant of a campaign's success was the strength of its chief of staff and team structure. However, he still believed Popkin's 1991 work remained the more essential read, given that it first presented the notion of "low-information rationality," which shaped how scholars viewed voter decision-making.

Sarah Niebler regarded the book as a substantive contribution to discussions about modern presidential campaigns and said that it demystified campaigns matter in significant ways. Niebler highlighted Popkin's categorization of different types of candidacies, noting that extensive case studies reinforced the central arguments. She commended the work's focus on how candidates build and manage their campaign teams. She also acknowledged being "convinced overall, despite the fact that this argument is a bit of a straw man."

Kate Kenski described it as "well-written and persuasive," and lauded Popkin's unique blend of campaign experience and scholarly insight. Kenski said that the book clarified how organizational decisions can have significant consequences for those seeking the highest office. She wrote: "a winning candidate for president must have a winning team behind him or her".

Joe Gandelman, the editor-in-chief of The Moderate Voice, described the book as a "political Bible" that offered a comprehensive set of guidelines for achieving electoral success. Gandelman considered its content "crammed with wisdom and rules" and believed it contained "solidness and critical information," citing endorsements from public figures across the political spectrum. He described how the work examined key factors that can make or break a candidacy, while admitting that campaigns ignore its lessons at their own peril. He described it as "required reading for political junkies, bloggers, partisans of any party, journalists, students".

In his review of the book for the Library Journal, Duncan Stewart called it "absorbing," attributing much of its appeal to the Popkin's background, experience, and extensive research spanning decades of presidential races. Stewart deemed it "Highly recommended," suggesting it deserved a place "next to the TV remote" for those seeking to follow campaign events with informed perspective.
