= Martha Bailey =

American economist

Martha J. Bailey
- Children: 2

Academic background
- Education: Vanderbilt University, PhD; Agnes Scott College, BA
- Doctoral advisor: William J. Collins

Academic work
- Discipline: Economics
- Institutions: University of California, Los Angeles; University of Michigan
- Awards: Carolyn Shaw Bell Award (2022)
- Website: https://sites.google.com/g.ucla.edu/marthajbailey; Information at IDEAS / RePEc

Martha J. Bailey is a professor of economics at the University of California, Los Angeles. She is also a Research Associate of the National Bureau of Economic Research, and a member of the executive committee of the American Economic Association.

== Background ==
She was previously a professor of economics at the University of Michigan from 2007 to 2020, where she was the first woman internally promoted to tenure in that department. In November 2017, Bloomberg Businessweek named her someone to watch in 2018, because "Her research on the positive economic effects of contraception has influenced debates around health care and pay equity." In 2022, she was awarded the Carolyn Shaw Bell Award.

Her research focus is long-run perspectives on how modern contraception changed women's childbearing, career decisions, and earnings histories. She has also studied the short and longer-term impact of the Great Society programs.

== Selected works ==
- Bailey, Martha J. "More power to the pill: the impact of contraceptive freedom on women's life cycle labor supply." The Quarterly Journal of Economics 121, no. 1 (2006): 289–320.
- Bailey, Martha, and Susan M. Dynarski. "Inequality in postsecondary attainment." (2011).
- Bailey, Martha J. "Momma's got the pill": how Anthony Comstock and Griswold v. Connecticut shaped US childbearing." American Economic Review 100, no. 1 (2010): 98-129.
- Bailey, Martha J., Brad Hershbein, and Amalia R. Miller. "The opt-in revolution? Contraception and the gender gap in wages." American Economic Journal: Applied Economics 4, no. 3 (2012): 225–54.
- Bailey, Martha J. "Reexamining the impact of family planning programs on US fertility: evidence from the War on Poverty and the early years of Title X." American Economic Journal: Applied Economics 4, no. 2 (2012): 62–97.
