= Kaye Husbands Fealing =

Economist

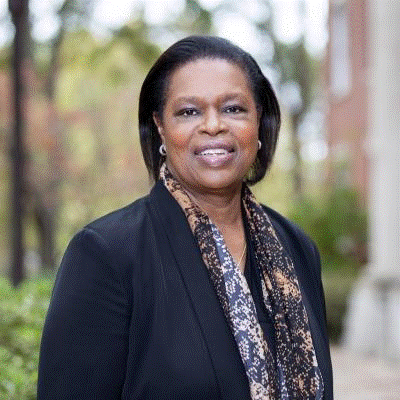
- Husbands Fealing in 2022
- Born: Barbados
- Education: University of Pennsylvania, B.A; Harvard University, PhD
- Children: 1
- Awards: 2017 Trailblazer Award from the National Medical Association Council on Concerns of Women Physicians; 2016 Elected Fellow of the American Association for the Advancement of Science (AAAS); 2019 Elected Fellow of the National Academy of Public Administration (NAPA); 2021 Elected Fellow of the American Academy of Arts and Sciences (AAAS)
- Scientific career
- Fields: Economics
- Workplaces: Williams College; Humphrey School of Public Affairs; Georgia Tech
- Website: https://www.iac.gatech.edu/people/faculty/fealing

Kaye Husbands Fealing is an American economist and professor in the Jimmy and Rosalynn Carter School of Public Policy. She is a former Dean of the Ivan Allen College of Liberal Arts at Georgia Tech. She previously taught for 20 years at Williams College, served in several staff positions with the National Science Foundation, and chaired the School of Public Policy at Georgia Tech. She is a former assistant director of the Social, Behavioral and Economic Sciences at the National Science Foundation, a former president of the National Economic Association.

== Early life and education ==
Husbands Fealing immigrated to the US from Barbados at the age of eight, and grew up in Brooklyn, NY. Her father was a lecturer of economics at Montclair State College. She earned a B.A. in mathematics and economics from the University of Pennsylvania and a PhD in economics from Harvard University.

== Career ==
Husbands Fealing taught at Williams College from 1989 through 2009, where she was William Brough professor of economics. During those years, she held visiting appointments at Smith College, Colgate University, Massachusetts Institute of Technology, and the National Science Foundation. She was a professor in the Center for Science, Technology and Environmental Policy at the Humphrey School of Public Affairs at the University of Minnesota until 2014, when she became chair of the Georgia Tech School of Public Policy. In 2020, she was appointed Dean of the Ivan Allen College of Liberal Arts at Georgia Tech. Husbands Fealing is an elected member of the American Academy of Arts and Sciences, is an Elected Fellow of the National Academy of Public Administration, an Elected Fellow of the American Association for the Advancement of Science (AAAS). She was awarded the 2023 Carolyn Shaw Bell Award from the American Economic Association's Committee on the Status of Women in the Economics Profession, and the 2017 Trailblazer Award from the National Medical Association Council on Concerns of Women Physicians.

At the National Science Foundation, she developed and was the first program director for the Science of Science and Innovation Policy (SciSIP) program and co-chaired the Science of Science Policy Interagency Task Group. She was also a program director for the NSF economics program.

== Selected research publications ==
- Campbell, John Y., Kaye Husbands Fealing (eds.). Financing Institutions of Higher Education. University of Chicago Press, 2026.
- Fealing, Kaye Husbands, Yufeng Lai, and Samuel L. Myers Jr. "Pathways vs. pipelines to broadening participation in the STEM workforce." Journal of Women and Minorities in Science and Engineering 21, no. 4 (2015).
- Krosnick, Jon A., Stanley Presser, Kaye Husbands Fealing, Steven Ruggles, and David Vannette. "The future of survey research: Challenges and opportunities." The National Science Foundation Advisory Committee for the Social, Behavioral and Economic Sciences Subcommittee on Advancing SBE Survey Research (2015): 1–15.
- Smith-Doerr, Laurel, Donald Tomaskovic-Devey, Sharla Alegria, Kaye Husbands Fealing, and Debra Fitzpatrick. "Gender pay gaps in US federal science agencies: An organizational approach." American Journal of Sociology 125, no. 2 (2019): 534–576.
- Gelan, Abera, Kaye Husbands Fealing, and James Peoples. "Inward foreign direct investment and racial employment patterns in US manufacturing." American Economic Review 97, no. 2 (2007): 378–382.

== Awards ==
- 2017: Trailblazer Award from the National Medical Association Council on Concerns of Women Physicians
- 2017: Elected Fellow of the American Association for the Advancement of Science (AAAS)
- 2019: Elected Fellow of the National Academy of Public Administration (NAPA)
- 2021: Elected member of the American Academy of Arts and Sciences
- 2023: Carolyn Shaw Bell Award
