= Barry Naughton =

American economist

Barry J. Naughton
- Education: University of Washington (BA), Yale University (MA, PhD)
- Occupations: Economist, professor
- Employer: UCSD

Barry J. Naughton is an American economist currently serving as So Kwanlok Chair of Chinese International Affairs at the University of California, San Diego's Graduate School of International Relations and Pacific Studies.

== Education ==
He received his Ph.D. in Economics and M.A. in International Relations from Yale University in 1986 and 1979 respectively, and a B.A., Chinese Language and Literature from the University of Washington in 1975.

== Academic career ==
In 1988 and 1991, Naughton published the first articles of Western scholarship addressing China's Third Front campaign to develop basic industry and national defense industry in the Country's interior. Relatively few other Western historians have addressed the Third Front in detail and those that do generally cite Naughton extensively.

In Naughton's view, China's use of the nomenklatura system of personnel management for Communist Party cadre is a core institution reinforcing national unity.

Naughton states that China's process of rural collectivization proceeded smoothly in part because, unlike the Soviet experience, a network of state institutions already existed in the countryside.

His 1995 book "Growing Out of the Plan: Chinese Economic Reform, 1978–1993" won the Masayoshi Ohira Memorial Prize. He writes that the Chinese economic reform was accomplished without a grand vision. Rather, it was the result of a mix between laissez-faire and experimentation with business incentives by the government.

Analyzing China's economic policymaking in a paper published in 2022, Naughton concludes that "Chinese policymakers genuinely believe they are creating a system that merges the efficiency of the market with the ability of the government to steer the economy."

Naughton is a participant of the Task Force on U.S.-China Policy convened by Asia Society's Center on US-China Relations.

== Publications ==
- The Chinese Economy: Transitions and Growth, 2007
- The Chinese Economy: Adaption and Growth, second edition of The Chinese Economy, 2018
- China: Adapting the Past, Confronting the Future, (with Thomas Buoye, Kirk Denton, and Bruce Dickson), 2002.
- Growing Out of the Plan: Chinese Economic Reform, 1978-1993, 1995.
- Holding China Together: Diversity and National Integration in the Post-Deng Era, (with Dali L. Yang), 2004.
- Reforming Asian Socialism: The Growth of Market Institutions, (with John McMillan), 1996.
- Urban Spaces in Contemporary China: The Potential for Autonomy and Community in Post-Mao China, (with Deborah S. Davis, Richard Kraus, and Elizabeth J. Perry), 1995.
- The China Circle: Economics and Electronics in the Prc, Taiwan, and Hong Kong, 1997.
- China's financial reform: Achievements and challenges, 1998.
- Intellectual property rights in China: Evolving business and legal frameworks, 1999.
- State investment in post-Mao China: The decline of central control, 1983.
