= Lawrence B. Krause =

American economist (born 1929)

- Citizenship: American
- Education: University of Michigan (BA, MA), Harvard University (PhD)
- Occupation: Economist

Lawrence Berle Krause (born 1929) is an American economist.

== Education ==
Krause received a B.A. from the University of Michigan (with distinction) in 1951, a M.A. in economics from the University of Michigan in 1952, and a Ph.D. in economics from Harvard University in 1958. His Ph.D. thesis is titled Current balance of payments problems of industrial countries: an empirical study.

== Career ==
Krause was a senior fellow at the Brookings Institution from 1963 to 1967 and 1969–86. He was a senior staff at the Council of Economic Advisers, from 1967 to 1969, under Lyndon B. Johnson. In 1986 he was named the first faculty member appointed to the newly created Graduate School of International Relations and Pacific Studies at the University of California, San Diego, where he was named Pacific Economic Cooperation Professor and director of the Korea-Pacific Program.

== Military service ==
- 1st Lt. United States Marine Corps, 1954–56

== Partial bibliography ==
- The United States Balance of Payments in 1968 (with Walter S. Salant and others), The Brookings Institution, 1963.
- The Common Market: Progress and Controversy (editor), Prentice-Hall Inc., 1964.
- European Economic Integration and the United States, The Brookings Institution, 1968.
- Sequel to Bretton Woods: A Proposal to Reform the World Monetary System, The Brookings Institution, 1971.
- European Monetary Unification and Its Meaning for the United States (with Walter Salant), The Brookings Institution, 1973.
- World Politics and International Economics, (co-edited with C. Fred Bergsten), The Brookings Institution, 1976.
- Economic Interaction in the Pacific Basin (with Sueo Sekiguchi), The Brookings Institution, 1980
- U. S. Economic Policy toward the Association of Southeast Asian Nations: Meeting the Japanese Challenge, The Brookings Institution, 1982.
- The Australian Economy, A View from the North (co-editor with Richard Caves), The Brookings Institution, 1984.
- The Singapore Economy Reconsidered (with Koh Ai Tee and Lee (Tsao) Yuan), Institute of Southeast Asian Studies, 1987. Chapter 5 "The Government as an Entrepreneur" was reprinted by Edward Elgar Publishing Ltd., UK in 1994, to appear in The Political Economy of East Asia edited by John Ravenhill, Australia National University.
- Social Issues in Korea: A Korean and American Perspective (co-edited with Fun-Koo Park) Korea Development Institute, 1993.
- Mineral Resources in the Pacific Area: Papers and Proceedings of the Ninth Pacific Trade and Development Conference(with Hugh Patrick), University Press of the Pacific, 2002.
- Liberalization in the Process of Economic Development (with Kim Kihwan), University of California Press, 1991.
- Britain's Economic Performance (with Richard Caves and Rudiger Dornbusch), 1981.
- Worldwide Inflation: Theory and Recent Experience (with Walter S. Salant), 1977.
- The U.S. economy and international trade, Brookings Institution, 1973.
- Recent international monetary crises: Causes and cures, and Fixed, flexible, and gliding exchange rates, Brookings Institution, 1971.
- The economics and politics of the Asian financial crisis of 1997-98, 1988
- Korea's economic role in East Asia: The Walter H. Shorenstein distinguished lecture, 1997.
- The challenge of Japan's financial reach for the U.S. economy, 1988.
- The United States economy and the Pacific basin (Trade and development in the Pacific basin : towards the year 2000, 1981.
- Anti-inflationary policies and growth, Seminar series - Korea International Economic Institute; no. 21, 1979.
- International economic outlook, Goldman Sachs. Economic research, 1978.
- Major policy issues for small open economies, with special reference to Korea, 1977.
- Evolution of foreign direct investment: the United States and Japan, Brookings Institution, 1973.
- The international economic system and the multinational corporation, Brookings Institution, 1972.
- Private international finance, Brookings Institution, 1972.
- Trade policy for the seventies, Brookings Institution, 1971.
- The impact of economic relations on the Atlantic Alliance, Brookings Institution, 1969
- The impact of European integration on the United States, The Brookings Institution, 1968.
- Economic problems of the NATO alliance, Brookings Institution, 1965.
- NATO and the economic problems of the Western alliance, 1964.
- Federal tax treatment of foreign income, 1964.
- Common Market Progress And Controversy, 1964.
