= Susan L. Shirk =

American political scientist

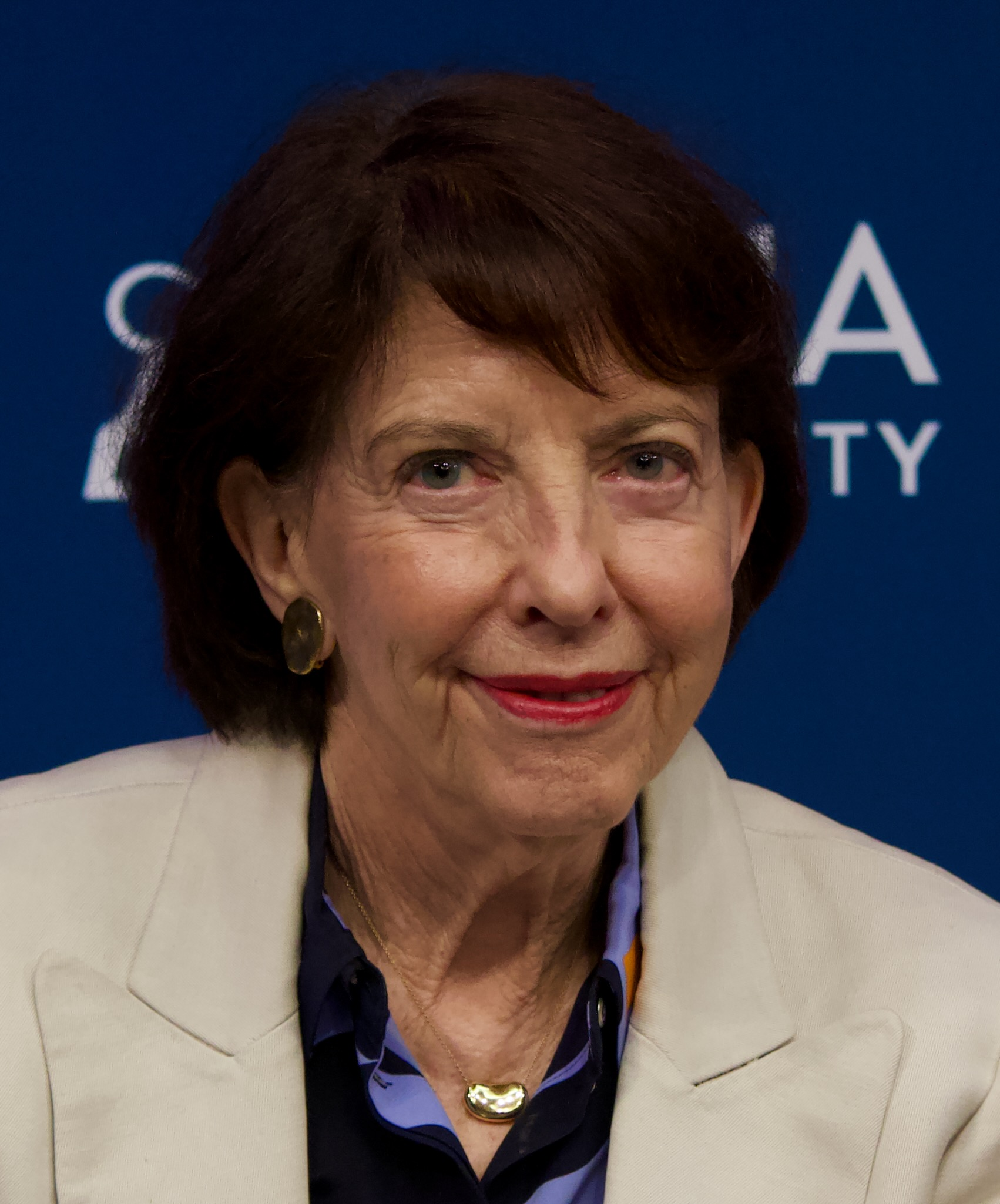
- Shirk at Asia Society in 2025
- Other name: 谢淑丽
- Education: Mount Holyoke College (BA); University of California, Berkeley (MA); Massachusetts Institute of Technology (PhD)
- Occupations: Political scientist; sinologist
- Employer: UCSD
- Spouse: Samuel L. Popkin

Susan L. Shirk is an American political scientist and China specialist currently serving as a research professor at University of California, San Diego School of Global Policy and Strategy. She was Deputy Assistant Secretary of State in the Bureau of East Asia and Pacific Affairs at the U.S. State Department from 1997 to 2000 during the Clinton administration.

== Early life and education ==
Shirk received a BA in political science from Mount Holyoke College in 1967, a MA in Asian studies from UC Berkeley in 1968, and a PhD in political science from MIT in 1974. She also attended Princeton's Critical Languages Program from 1965 to 1966.

She first traveled to China in 1971 as a member of the Committee of Concerned Asian Scholars.

== Career ==
Shirk is the Ho Miu Lam Endowed Chair of China and Pacific Relations in the School of Global Policy and Strategy at UCSD and Director of the Institute on Global Conflict and Cooperation. She formerly directed the Northeast Asia Cooperation Dialogue, a track II diplomatic initiative.

== Awards ==
Shirk is the recipient of the 2024 Association for Asian Studies' Distinguished Contributions to Asian Studies Award.

== Selected books ==
- Overreach: How China Derailed Its Peaceful Rise, 2022. ISBN 978-0190068516.
- China: Fragile Superpower: How China's Internal Politics Could Derail Its Peaceful Rise, 2007. ISBN 978-0195373196.
- How China Opened Its Door: The Political Success of the PRC's Foreign Trade and Investment Reform, 1994. ISBN 978-0815778530.
- The Political Logic of Economic Reform in China, 1993. ISBN 978-0520077072.
- The Challenge of China and Japan: Politics and Development in East Asia, 1985. ISBN 978-0030717994
- Competitive Comrades: Career Incentives and Student Strategies in China, 1982. ISBN 978-0030717994.
