= Sandra Black (economist) =

American economist (born 1969)

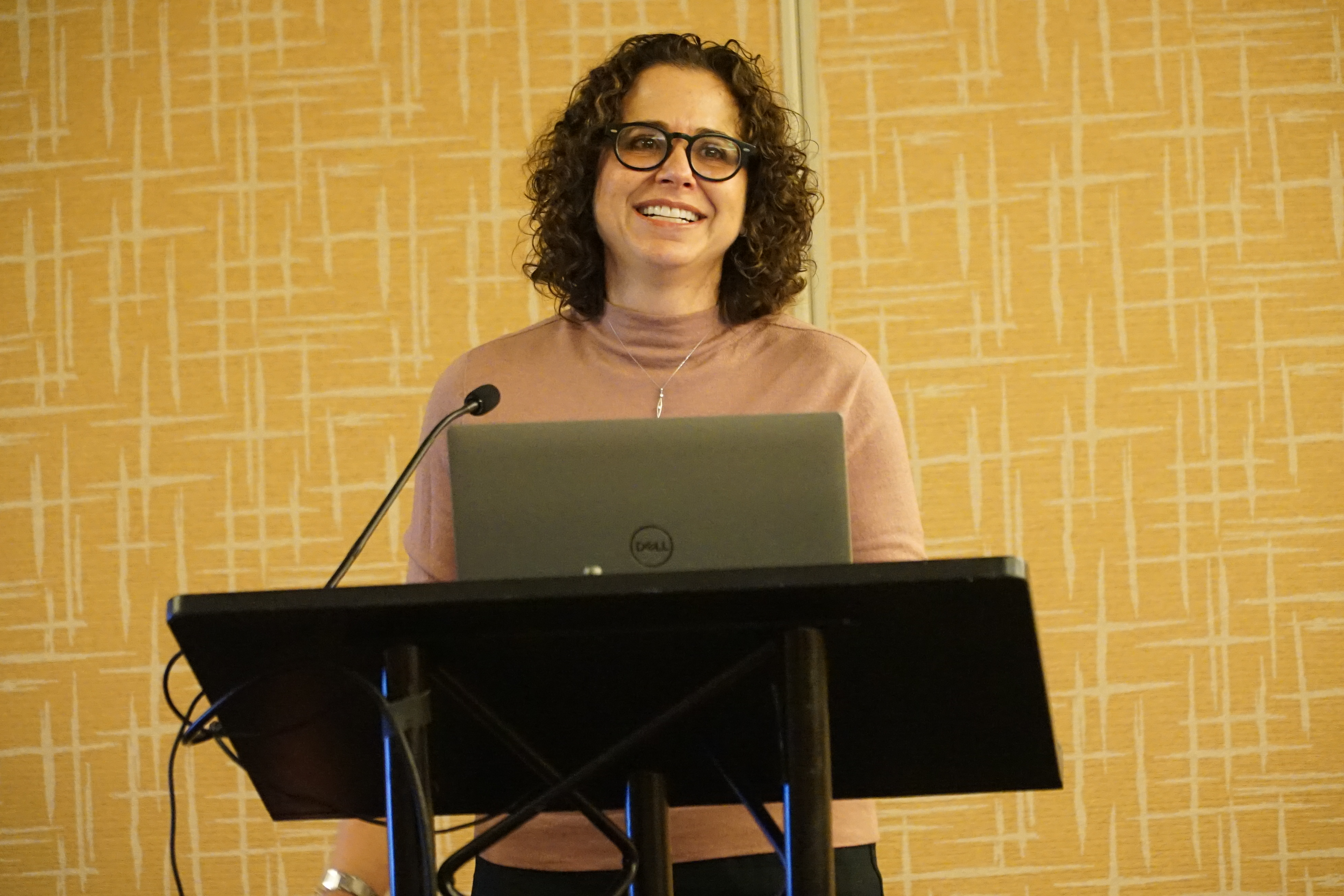
- Born: 1969 (age 56–57)

Academic background
- Education: University of California, Berkeley (BA); Harvard University (MA, PhD)
- Doctoral advisor: Lawrence F. Katz

Academic work
- Institutions: Columbia University
- Website: Official website

Sandra Eilene Black (born 1969) is a professor of economics at the University of Texas at Austin. She received her B.A. from UC Berkeley and her Ph.D. in economics from Harvard University. Since that time, she worked as an economist at the Federal Reserve Bank of New York, and as an assistant, associate, and ultimately full professor in the Department of Economics at UCLA before arriving at the University of Texas at Austin in 2010. She became a Professor in the department of Economics at Columbia University in 2019, before returning to the University of Texas at Austin in 2025. She is currently a research associate at the National Bureau of Economic Research (NBER), a research affiliate at IZA Institute of Labor Economics, and a nonresident senior fellow at Brookings Institution. She served as a Member of Barack Obama’s Council of Economic Advisers from August 2015 to January 2017. In 2024, Black received the Carolyn Shaw Bell Award, which the American Economic Association's Committee on the Status of Women in the Economics Profession gives for advancing the status of women in economics.

== Research ==
Her research focuses on the role of early life experiences on the long-run outcomes of children, as well as issues of gender and discrimination.

=== Selected works ===
- Black, Sandra E., and Lisa M. Lynch. "How to compete: the impact of workplace practices and information technology on productivity." Review of Economics and statistics 83, no. 3 (2001): 434–445.
- Black, Sandra E. "Do better schools matter? Parental valuation of elementary education." The Quarterly Journal of Economics 114, no. 2 (1999): 577–599.
- Black, Sandra E., and Lisa M. Lynch. "Human-capital investments and productivity." The American economic review 86, no. 2 (1996): 263–267.
- Black, Sandra E., Paul J. Devereux, and Kjell G. Salvanes. "The more the merrier? The effect of family size and birth order on children's education." The Quarterly Journal of Economics 120, no. 2 (2005): 669–700.
- Black, Sandra E., Paul J. Devereux, and Kjell G. Salvanes. "From the cradle to the labor market? The effect of birth weight on adult outcomes." The Quarterly Journal of Economics 122, no. 1 (2007): 409–439.

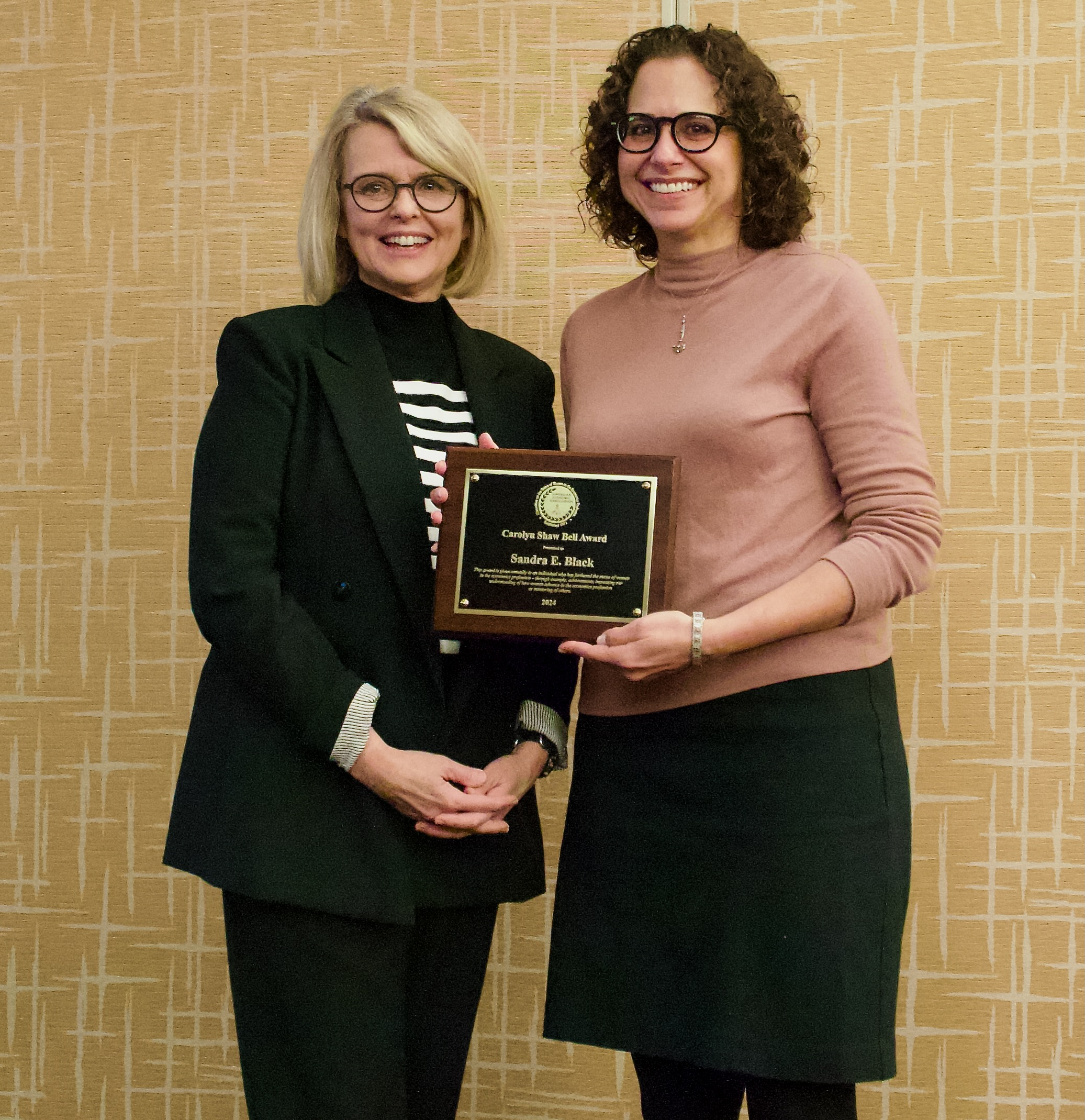
Sandra Black is awarded CSWEP's 2024 Carolyn Shaw Bell Award at AEA 2025 in San Francisco (Jan 4, 2024)
