= Samuel L. Popkin =

American political scientist (born 1942)

- Born: June 9, 1942 (age 84)
- Occupation: Political scientist
- Spouse: Susan Shirk

Samuel L. Popkin (born June 9, 1942) is an American political scientist who teaches at the University of California, San Diego. Popkin has played a role in the development of rational choice models in political science. He is also noted for his work as a pollster.

== Early life ==
Popkin was born on June 9, 1942. He received his Ph.D. from the Massachusetts Institute of Technology in 1969.

== Career ==
His most recent book is The Candidate: What it Takes to Win (and Hold) the White House. Earlier he wrote The Reasoning Voter: Communication and Persuasion in Presidential Campaigns and co-authored Issues and Strategies: The Computer Simulation of Presidential Campaigns. He also co-edited Chief of Staff: Twenty-Five Years of Managing the Presidency.

When he was assistant professor of government, in 1972, he was jailed for a week, for his refusal to answer questions before a grand jury investigating the Pentagon Papers case, during a hearing before the Boston's Federal District Court. The Faculty Council later passed a resolution condemning the government's interrogation of scholars on the grounds that "an unlimited right of grand juries to ask any question and to expose a witness to citations for contempt could easily threaten scholarly research."

Popkin is equally well known for his work on peasant society, with particular reference to East and Southeast Asia, including The Rational Peasant: The Political Economy of Rural Society in Vietnam.

Popkin has also been a consulting analyst in presidential campaigns, serving as consultant on Bill Clinton's presidential campaign on polling and strategy, to the CBS News election units from 1983 to 1990 on survey design and analysis, and more recently to the Gore campaign. He has also served as consultant to political parties in Canada and Europe and to the Departments of State and Defense. His current research focuses on presidential campaigns and the relationship of public opinion to foreign policy.

== Personal life ==
Popkin is married to Susan Shirk, research professor and chair of the 21st Century China Center at the Graduate School of Global Policy and Strategy at the University of California, San Diego.

== Selected publications ==
- The Reasoning Voter: Communication and Persuasion in Presidential Campaigns
- The Rational Peasant: The Political Economy of Rural Society in Vietnam
- Candidates, Issues and Strategies
- Chief of Staff: Twenty-Five Years of Managing the Presidency, co-editor with Samuel Kernell
