= Sandra Ohrn Moose =

American economist

- Born: January 17, 1942 (age 84)
- Citizenship: United States
- Education: Wheaton College; Harvard University
- Awards: Carolyn Shaw Bell Award, 1999; Honorary doctorate from Wheaton College, 2009; Harvard Medal, 2015
- Scientific career
- Fields: Economics; Management consulting
- Workplaces: Boston Consulting Group

Sandra Ohrn Moose is a senior advisor at the Boston Consulting Group, where she was the first woman hired as a business-strategy consultant.

She is a director of several public companies, including Verizon Communications, President of the Board of Trustees of the Boston Museum of Fine Arts, and a donor and fundraiser for Harvard University and Wheaton College. She was also the first woman elected as Chair of the Alfred P. Sloan Foundation Board of Trustees.

Ohrn Moose graduated from Wheaton College in 1963 with a degree in economics and an interest in going into business. At the time, Harvard did not admit women to the two-year Master's of Business Administration program, and so she enrolled in the PhD program in Economics.

Finishing her PhD in early 1968, she interviewed with the Boston Consulting Group, intending to work outside the university environment for only a short period of time. She was offered a position with that company as its first female business strategy consultant, and remains with the company to the present day.

She was awarded the 1999 Carolyn Shaw Bell Award for advancing the careers of women in the economics profession.
