= Stephan Haggard =

American political scientist

Academic background
- Education: University of California, Berkeley (BA, MA, PhD)
- Doctoral advisor: Ernst B. Haas

Academic work
- Discipline: Political science
- Institutions: University of California, San Diego
- Website: www.stephanhaggard.com

Stephan Haggard is an American political scientist whose research focuses on international political economy, comparative politics, democratization, and East Asian politics, particularly the Korean peninsula. He is a Distinguished Research Professor at the School of Global Policy and Strategy at the University of California, San Diego and research director for Democracy and Global Governance at the UC Institute on Global Conflict and Cooperation. His scholarship includes work on developmental states, economic reform and adjustment, democratic transitions and backsliding, and the political economy of North Korea.

Before joining UC San Diego, Haggard taught in the Department of Government at Harvard University from 1983 to 1991. From 2005 to 2022, he was editor of the Journal of East Asian Studies.

== Research ==
Haggard's scholarship has addressed several areas of international and comparative political economy, including development, democratization, economic reform, and the Korean peninsula.

=== Political economy and development ===
Haggard's early work examined the political economy of growth, industrialization, and economic reform in developing countries. His book Pathways from the Periphery: The Politics of Growth in the Newly Industrializing Countries compared development strategies in East Asia and Latin America, with attention to the role of state institutions in economic development. He later returned to these themes in Developmental States.

Haggard has also written on economic adjustment, reform, and financial crises. With Peter B. Evans, he co-edited The Politics of Economic Adjustment: International Constraints, Distributive Conflicts, and the State. His book The Political Economy of the Asian Financial Crisis analyzed the 1997 Asian financial crisis and its political and institutional consequences.

=== Democratization and regime change ===
Much of Haggard's work with Robert R. Kaufman has focused on democratic transitions, regime change, and the political economy of democracy. Their book The Political Economy of Democratic Transitions examined the relationship between economic conditions, political institutions, and transitions to democratic rule. Their later work addressed welfare regimes, inequality, and democratic stability, including Development, Democracy, and Welfare States and the article "Inequality and Regime Change: Democratic Transitions and the Stability of Democratic Rule". Haggard and Kaufman continued this line of research in Dictators and Democrats and Backsliding: Democratic Regress in the Contemporary World.

=== North Korea and the Korean peninsula ===
Haggard has written extensively on the political economy of North Korea, often in collaboration with Marcus Noland. Their work has examined famine, markets, refugee experiences, sanctions, aid, and reform in North Korea. Their co-authored books include Famine in North Korea: Markets, Aid, and Reform, Witness to Transformation: Refugee Insights into North Korea, and Hard Target: Sanctions, Inducements, and the Case of North Korea. From 2011 to 2019, Haggard and Noland wrote the blog North Korea: Witness to Transformation, which covered political, humanitarian, economic, and security issues related to North Korea.

== Education ==
Haggard received a B.A. in political science in 1976, an M.A. in 1977, and a Ph.D. in political science in 1983 from the University of California, Berkeley. His doctoral dissertation was supervised by political scientist Ernst B. Haas.

== Selected works ==
- Haggard, Stephan (1990). Pathways from the Periphery: The Politics of Growth in the Newly Industrializing Countries. Ithaca: Cornell University Press. ISBN 978-0-8014-9750-6.
- Haggard, Stephan; Kaufman, Robert R. (1995). The Political Economy of Democratic Transitions. Princeton, New Jersey: Princeton University Press. ISBN 978-0-691-02775-3.
- Haggard, Stephan (2000). The Political Economy of the Asian Financial Crisis. Washington, D.C.: Institute for International Economics. ISBN 978-0-88132-283-5.
- Haggard, Stephan; Noland, Marcus (2007). Famine in North Korea: Markets, Aid, and Reform. New York: Columbia University Press. ISBN 978-0-231-14000-3.
- Haggard, Stephan; Kaufman, Robert R. (2008). Development, Democracy, and Welfare States: Latin America, East Asia, and Eastern Europe. Princeton, New Jersey: Princeton University Press. ISBN 978-0-691-13596-0.
- Haggard, Stephan; Kaufman, Robert R. (2016). Dictators and Democrats: Masses, Elites, and Regime Change. Princeton, New Jersey: Princeton University Press. ISBN 978-0-691-17215-6.
- Haggard, Stephan; Noland, Marcus (2017). Hard Target: Sanctions, Inducements, and the Case of North Korea. Stanford, California: Stanford University Press. ISBN 978-1-5036-0036-2.
- Haggard, Stephan (2018). Developmental States. Cambridge: Cambridge University Press. doi:10.1017/9781108552738. ISBN 978-1-108-44949-6.
- Haggard, Stephan; Kaufman, Robert R. (2021). Backsliding: Democratic Regress in the Contemporary World. Cambridge: Cambridge University Press. doi:10.1017/9781108957809. ISBN 978-1-108-95840-0.
