= Elizabeth Bailey =

American economist (1938–2022)

- Born: Elizabeth Ellery Raymond; November 26, 1938; New York City, U.S.
- Died: August 19, 2022 (aged 83); Reston, Virginia, U.S.
- Education: Radcliffe College; Stevens Institute of Technology; Princeton University
- Known for: Studying deregulation and economic regulation; airline deregulation
- Spouse: James Lawrence Bailey (divorced)
- Children: 2
- Awards: Carolyn Shaw Bell Award, 2009; Fellow, American Academy of Arts and Sciences, 1997
- Scientific career
- Fields: Economics
- Workplaces: The Wharton School; Carnegie Mellon; Bell Laboratories
- Website: bepp.wharton.upenn.edu/profile/baileye/

Elizabeth Ellery Bailey (née Raymond; November 26, 1938 – August 19, 2022) was an American economist. She was the John C. Hower Professor of Business and Public Policy, at The Wharton School of the University of Pennsylvania. Bailey studied deregulation, market competition and regulatory capture through her career and contributed to the deregulation of the airline industry in the United States in the late 1970s.

Bailey was the first woman to graduate with a PhD in economics from Princeton University and was considered a "pathbreaker for women in economics".

== Early life ==
Bailey was born on November 26, 1938, in New York City to Henrietta Dana Raymond and Irving W. Raymond, both of whom were history professors. She was the second of five daughters in the family. She grew up in New York City, where she graduated from the Chapin School in 1956. She received her bachelor's degree from Radcliffe College, a master's degree from Stevens Institute of Technology and her Ph.D. from Princeton University, where she was the first woman to receive a doctoral degree in economics.

== Career ==
Bailey started her career working as a computer programmer at Bell Laboratories. Bailey worked in technical programming at Bell Laboratories from 1960 to 1972, before transferring to the economic research section from 1972 to 1977. She was the first woman appointed a department head (the economic research section) at Bell Laboratories. During her time there, she was part of a group that studied monopolies and regulatory distortions, and even gave presentations on the topic to AT&T executives and advisors including William Baumol and Alfred E. Kahn, with whom she would later go on to collaborate.

In 1977, President Jimmy Carter named Bailey the first woman Civil Aeronautics Board (CAB) commissioner. In 1981, she was named the first woman vice chairman of the agency by President Ronald Reagan. Between 1977 and 1983 she served on the Civil Aeronautics Board, where she oversaw the deregulation of the airline industry in the United States. Bailey studied deregulation and regulatory capture through her career and contributed to the passage of the Airline Deregulation Act, a 1978 United States federal regulation that freed airlines from government control in pricing, route planning, competition and market composition. Colleagues of the time including economist Kahn, noted her to have been the fiercest proponent of deregulation in the committee. Outside of the field of deregulations, during her time at the CAB, she also pushed for the rights of non-smokers to be guaranteed a smoke-free seat in airlines, not liking cigarette smoke herself.

From 1983 to 1990, Bailey was Dean of the Graduate School of Industrial Administration of Carnegie Mellon University. Bailey became the first woman dean to head a Top 10 graduate school with this appointment. Bailey joined The Wharton School in July 1991, having served from July 1990 to June 1991 as a professor of industrial administration at Carnegie Mellon University (CMU), and as a visiting scholar at the Yale School of Organization and Management. She had served as dean at CMU between 1983 and 1990. She was elected a Fellow of the American Academy of Arts and Sciences in 1997. She served on the Board of Directors of TIAA-CREF, Altria, and CSX Corporation, and was a trustee of The Brookings Institution and a member of the National Bureau of Economic Research. Bailey also served as the Vice Chairman of Bancroft NeuroHealth.

Bailey was noted to have opened opportunities for women in economics. An obituary in The Washington Post called Bailey a "pathbreaker for women in economics". She was the first woman to graduate with a doctorate in economics from Princeton University and was often among the lone women in various corporate boards. During her confirmation hearing in the late 1970s to become the Civil Aeronautics Board commissioner, she was asked by Ted Stevens, a senator from Alaska, about her "steel" to which she is noted to have remarked that she was "tougher" than she looked.

Bailey received the Carolyn Shaw Bell award from the American Economic Association in 2009. She was inducted into the American Academy of Arts and Sciences in 1977 and held a chair at the National Bureau of Economic Research.

== Personal life ==
Bailey was married to James Lawrence Bailey in a marriage that ended in a divorce. She had two sons, with one of them predeceasing her in 2018.

Bailey was suffering from Parkinson's disease and died on August 19, 2022, at her home in Reston, Virginia, aged 83.

== Select published works ==
- Bailey, Elizabeth E. (1971). The Effect of Lagged Regulation in an Averch-Johnson Model.
- Bailey, Elizabeth E. (1973). Economic Theory of Regulatory Constraint [By] Elizabeth E. Bailey. Lexington Books.
- Bailey, Elizabeth E. (1973). Economic Theory of Regulatory Constraint. Lexington Books. ISBN 978-0-669-87114-2.
- Bailey, Elizabeth E.; White, Lawrence J. (1974). Reversals in Peak and Offpeak Prices. New York University Department of Economics.
- Bailey, Elizabeth E. (1975). Peak Load Pricing Principles: Past and Present. Bell Laboratories.
- Bailey, Elizabeth E. (1979). History and Recent Experience with Low Fare Policies in Domestic U.S. Air Transportation and Their Relevance Internationally. Civil Aeronautics Board.
- Bailey, Elizabeth E. (1979). Air Carrier Deregulation, a Model for Trucking?. Civil Aeronautics Board.
- Bailey, Elizabeth E. (1981). The Contestability of Airline Markets During the Transition to Deregulation. Bell Laboratories.
- Bailey, Elizabeth E.; Graham, David R.; Kaplan, Daniel P. (1983). Deregulating the Airlines: An Economic Analysis. Civil Aeronautics Board.
- Bailey, Elizabeth E. (1989). Public Policy Appraisal: Two Hundred Years of Transportation and Communication Policy. Institute of Government and Public Affairs, University of Illinois.
- Bailey, Elizabeth E. (1994). Airline Consolidation and Consumer Welfare. Institute for Law and Economics, University of Pennsylvania.
- Bailey, Elizabeth E.; Rastogi, Ajai (1995). The Decision-funnel Approach for the Prevention of High-consequence Process Accidents. Wharton Risk Management and Decision Processes Center.
