= Trough (economics) =

Lowest turning point of a business cycle

In economics, a trough is a low turning point or a local minimum of a business cycle. The time evolution of many economics variables exhibits a wave-like behavior with local maxima (peaks) followed by local minima (troughs). A business cycle may be defined as the period between two consecutive peaks.

The period of the business cycle in which real GDP is increasing is called the expansion, in which the real GDP moves from the trough towards the peak.
