= Yan Chen (mechanical engineer) =

Chinese mechanical engineer

Yan Chen (Chinese: 陈焱) is a Chinese mechanical engineer specializing in reconfigurable mechanisms including rigid origami, metamaterials, and deployable structures. She is a professor of mechanical engineering at Tianjin University, where she heads the Motion Structure Laboratory.

== Education and career ==
Chen studied engineering at the Jilin University of Technology (now part of Jilin University), earning a bachelor's degree in 1997 and a bachelor's degree in 1999. She went to the University of Oxford for doctoral study in engineering science, completing a doctorate (D.Phil.) in 2004.

After working in industry in England for a year, she returned to China in 2005 as an assistant professor of mechanical and aerospace engineering at Nanyang Technological University. She moved to her present position as a full professor at Tianjin University in 2012.

== Book ==
Chen is the author of the open-access book Motion Structures: Deployable Structural Assemblies of Mechanisms (CRC Press, 2011).

== Recognition ==
Chen was named as one of the 2012 New Century Outstanding Talents of the Ministry of Education, and as one of the 2016 Youth Science and Technology Innovation Leaders of the Ministry of Science and Technology. She was elected as a Fellow of the Institution of Mechanical Engineers in 2015.
