= Yan Chen (economist) =

Economist

- Born: July 11, 1966 (age 60); Beijing, China
- Education: California Institute of Technology; Tsinghua University
- Awards: Carolyn Shaw Bell Award, 2019
- Scientific career
- Fields: Experimental economics Behavioral market design
- Workplaces: University of Michigan; Shanghai Jiaotong University; Tsinghua University
- Doctoral advisor: John Ledyard
- Website: https://yanchen.people.si.umich.edu/

Yan Chen (born July 11, 1966) is a Chinese American behavioral and experimental economist. She is Daniel Kahneman Collegiate Professor of Information at the University of Michigan School of Information, research professor in the Research Center for Group Dynamics at the University of Michigan Institute for Social Research, and distinguished visiting professor at the School of Economics and Management at Tsinghua University, where she directs the Economics Science and Policy Experimental Lab. She is a former president of the Economic Science Association, an international organization of experimental economists.

== Early life and education ==
Chen studied English for Science and Technology as an undergraduate student at Tsinghua University in China, and became interested in Economics because of the impact of the reform and opening up happening around her. Since English majors were not eligible for graduate school in economics in Tsinghua University, she came to the U.S. for graduate school at Caltech.

== Career ==
Her first position at the University of Michigan was in the economics department, but she did not receive tenure in that department. Since she was working on congestion allocation mechanisms for Internet routers at the time, she was recruited to a new tenure-track position on the faculty of the University of Michigan School of Information. She received tenure towards the end of her first year at the School of Information.

== Research ==
Chen is known for her research on behavioral and experimental economics, market and mechanism design, and public economics

=== Selected works ===
- Chen, Yan, and Sherry Xin Li. "Group identity and social preferences." American Economic Review 99, no. 1 (2009): 431–57.
- Chen, Roy, and Yan Chen. "The potential of social identity for equilibrium selection." American Economic Review 101, no. 6 (2011): 2562–89.
- Chen, Yan, F. Maxwell Harper, Joseph Konstan, and Sherry Xin Li. "Social comparisons and contributions to online communities: A field experiment on movielens." American Economic Review 100, no. 4 (2010): 1358–98.
- Chen, Yan, and Tayfun Sönmez. "School choice: an experimental study." Journal of Economic theory 127, no. 1 (2006): 202–231.
- Chen, Yan, and Fang-Fang Tang. "Learning and incentive-compatible mechanisms for public goods provision: An experimental study." Journal of Political Economy 106, no. 3 (1998): 633–662.
- Chen, Yan. "Incentive-compatible mechanisms for pure public goods: A survey of experimental research." Handbook of experimental economics results 1 (2008): 625–643.
