= Journal of Economic Behavior and Organization =

- Discipline: Economics
- Language: English

Publication details
- History: 1980–present
- Publisher: Elsevier (Netherlands)
- Frequency: Monthly
- Impact factor: 2.3 (2024)

Standard abbreviations
- ISO 4: J. Econ. Behav. Organ.

Indexing
- CODEN: JEBOD9
- ISSN: 0167-2681
- LCCN: 81644042
- OCLC no.: 38992683

Links
- Journal homepage; Online access

The Journal of Economic Behavior and Organization is an academic journal published by Elsevier. It was started in 1980 by North-Holland, later merged into Elsevier. It publishes research on economic decision and behaviour influence organizations and markets.

== Abstracting and indexing ==
The journal is abstracted and indexed in the Social Sciences Citation Index. According to the Journal Citation Reports, the journal has a 2024 impact factor of 2.3, ranking it 175th out of 620 journals in the category "Economics".

== See also ==
- List of economics journals
