= Eastern Economic Journal =

- Language: English
- Edited by: Brad R. Humphreys, Jane E. Ruseski

Publication details
- History: 1973; 53 years ago – present
- Publisher: Palgrave Macmillan on behalf of the Eastern Economic Association
- Frequency: Quarterly

Standard abbreviations
- ISO 4: East. Econ. J.

Indexing
- ISSN: 0094-5056 (print); 1939-4632 (web)
- LCCN: 74645290
- JSTOR: 00945056
- OCLC no.: 42629270

Links
- Journal homepage; Online archive

The Eastern Economic Journal is a quarterly peer-reviewed academic journal covering all aspects of economics. It was established in 1973 and is published by Palgrave Macmillan on behalf of the Eastern Economic Association. The editors are Brad R. Humphreys and Jane E. Ruseski.

== Abstracting and indexing ==
The journal is abstracted and indexed in:

- RePEc
- EconLit
- EconPapers
- ABI/Inform
- Business Publications Index and Abstracts
- Worldwide Political Science Abstracts
- Business Source Elite
- Scopus
