= Ulrike Schaede =

Ulrike Schaede (ウリケ・シェーデ) is Professor of Japanese Business at the School of Global Policy and Strategy (GPS) at the University of California, San Diego. She is a leading scholar of global business and Japan and conducts research on Japanese business organizations and business strategies, including management and employment practices, supply chains, and Japan’s ongoing business transformation. She has also published on Japan's industrial groups and political economy, antitrust, financial system and corporate governance, entrepreneurship and innovation She is the Founding Director of the Japan Forum for Innovation and Technology (JFIT) and head of the International Management track at GPS. She has written nine books and over 50 articles on Japanese corporate strategy, business and management. Her current interest is the changing business models of large Japanese companies and their pursuit of a “Mainoumi” (or “aggregate niche) – a concept she developed in her 2020 book “The Business Reinvention of Japan." She is a fellow at the Mitsubishi Research Institute and an advisor to the Life Science Innovation Network Japan (LINK-J). She also serves as an advisory board member at the IGPI Group, Japan, and the National Bureau of Asian Research.

Schaede is the founder and host of the Japan Zoominar Japan Forum Webinars, a regular webinar series that invites scholars, experts, and private and public sphere officials for discussions of current events in Japan and Asia. Her websites are on the School of Global Policy and Strategy and on www.ulrikeschaede.com.

Schaede was awarded the OAG Prize for the best book written on Japan in 1990-1991 by the Ostasiatische Gesellschaft Tokyo in 1991. Her 2020 book, "The Business Reinvention of Japan," won the 2021 Masayoshi Ohira Award and has been translated into Japanese as "Saikō THE KAISHA" (2023). In 2024, she published "Shin Nihon no Keiei" (forthcoming in English as Japan Re-Emerges).

== Background ==
Schaede received her Ph.D. in Japan Studies/Economics (1989) from the University of Marburg, Germany and an M.A. in Japanese Studies/Economics (1987) and a Translator's Diploma in Japanese (1985) from University of Bonn, Germany. Schaede is trilingual (German, English, and Japanese). She has lived in Tokyo, Japan for a total of more than nine years. She has been invited as a visiting professor to Hitotsubashi University in Tokyo, the Haas Business School at UC Berkeley, and the Harvard Business School, and the Hoover Institution at Stanford University. She has been a visiting scholar at the research institutes of the Bank of Japan, Japan's Ministry of Finance, Japan's Ministry of Economy, Trade and Industry, and the Development Bank of Japan. She has served on the academic advisory boards of the German Institute for Japanese Studies (DIJ, Max-Weber-Stiftung) in Tokyo, and the IN-EAST program at the University of Duisburg-Essen in Germany.

== Books ==
- Shin Nihon no keiei – Hikan baiasu wo haisu シン日本の経営：悲観バイアスを排す (New Japan Management: Overcoming the Negativity Bias). Tokyo: Nikkei Premiere Shinsho. 2024. ISBN 9781503612365. Forthcoming in English as “Japan Re-Emerges” (Amazon) (link).
- The Business Reinvention of Japan: How to Make Sense of the New Japan and Why it Matters. Stanford University Press. 2020. ISBN 9781503612365. Translated as Saikō THE KAISHA: Nihon no bijinesu riinbenshion (再興 THE KAISHA 日本のビジネス・リインベンション) (link), Nikkei BP Nihon Keizai Shinbun Shuppan, 2022.
- The Digital Transformation and Japan's Political Economy. Cambridge University Press, Cambridge Elements in Politics and Society in East Asia. 2022. (with Kay Shimizu)
- Creating Ambidextrous Organizations: Exploration and Exploitation for Overcoming Inertia (Ryōkiki no soshiki o tsukuru, 両利きの組織をつくる: 大企業病を打破する攻めと守りの経営) with Masanori Kato and Charles A. O'Reilly III. Tokyo: Eiji Shuppan. 2020. (in Japanese)
- Choose and Focus: Japan's Business Strategies for the 21st Century. Cornell University Press. 2008.
- Japan's Managed Globalization: Adapting to the 21st Century. co-edited with William W. Grimes. 2003.
- Cooperative Capitalism: Self-Regulation, Trade Associations, and the Antimonopoly Law in Japan. Oxford University Press. 2000.
- Der neue japanische Kapitalmarkt – Finanzfutures in Japan [The New Japanese Capital Market – Financial Futures in Japan]. 1990. (in German).
- Geldpolitik in Japan 1950–1985 [Monetary Policy in Japan 1950–1985]. 1989. (in German)
