= Barbara Fraumeni =

US economist

Barbara Morry Fraumeni
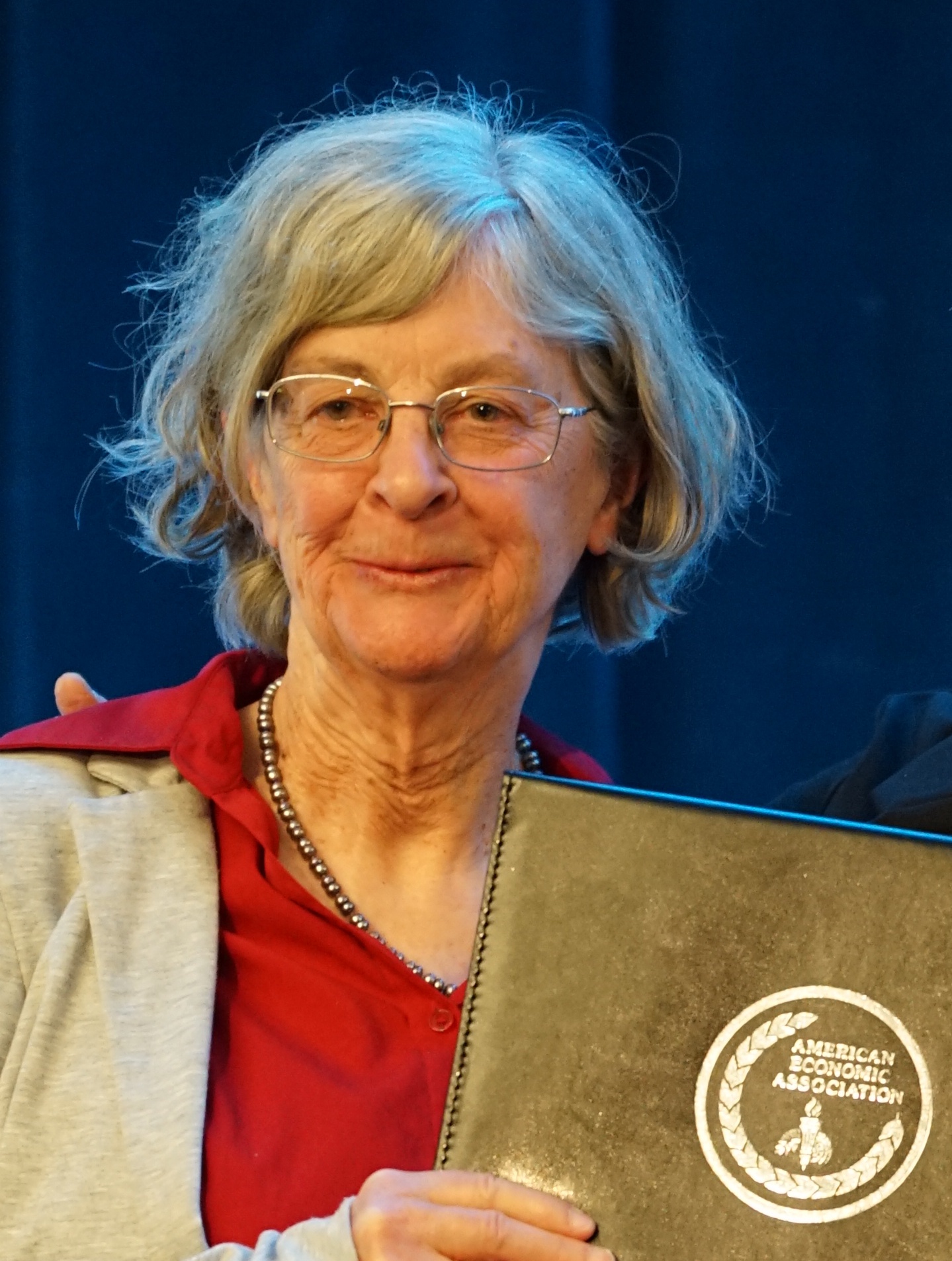
- Fraumeni at ASSA 2026
- Born: December 9, 1949 (age 76)
- Education: Wellesley College; Boston College
- Awards: Carolyn Shaw Bell Award, 2006; Gold Medal of the U.S. Department of Commerce, 2006
- Scientific career
- Fields: Economics
- Workplaces: Wellesley College; Tufts University; Northeastern University; University of Southern Maine
- Website: https://www.iza.org/person/16785/barbara-m-fraumeni

Barbara Morry Fraumeni (born December 9, 1949) is a Distinguished Fellow of the American Economic Association,Professor Emerita of Public Policy at the Muskie in the School of Public Service, University of Southern Maine, United States, Research Associate of the National Bureau of Economic Research, United States, Special-term Professor at the Central University of Finance and Economics, China, Senior Fellow at Hunan University, China, and a Research Fellow of the IZA Network, Germany. She is an authority on human capital (World Bank, UN, and OECD) and nonhuman capital, economic growth, productivity, and non-market accounts. She is a former program officer with the National Science Foundation and Chief Economist at the U.S. Bureau of Economic Analysis. While serving as Chief Economist at the Bureau of Economic Analysis, she was part of a team responsible for modifying the National Accounts to treat Research and Development as an investment and assess its contribution to economic growth.

== Early life and education ==
Fraumeni attended Wellesley College graduating in 1972 with a degree in economics and going on to earn a Ph.D. in economics from Boston College.

She rowed in the first U.S. women's national championship in 1966 and subsequently won 5 national lightweight sculling titles: singles dash, doubles, and quad, between 1967 and 1969. She retired from rowing in 1969 after traveling to Europe as an alternate on the second U.S. women's national team.

== Awards ==
For her lifetime contributions she was named a 2025 American Economic Association Distinguished Fellow. For her work as Chief Economist at the Bureau of Economic Analysis, the U.S. Department of Commerce awarded her its highest honor (the Gold Medal) in November 2006. Also in 2006 she received the Carolyn Shaw Bell award of the American Economic Association's Committee on the Status of Women in the Economics Profession. This award is given annually to a person who has furthered the status of women in the economics professions.
