= Feminist economics =

Gender-aware branch of economics

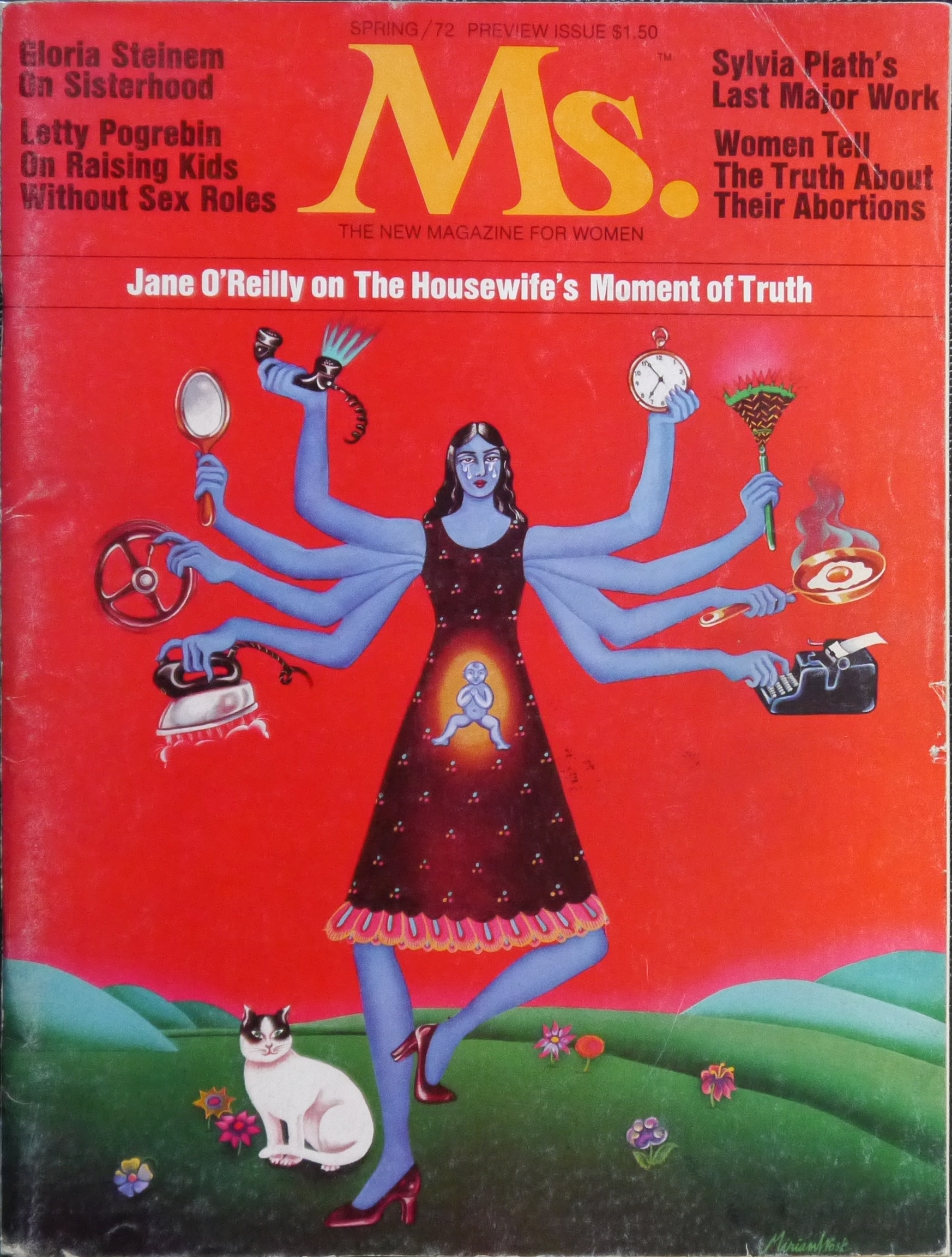
The first issue of Ms. examined feminist economics in a piece by Jane O'Reilly

Feminist economics is the critical study of economics and economies, with a focus on feminism, specifically gender-aware and inclusive economic inquiry and policy analysis. Feminist economic researchers include academics, activists, policy theorists, and practitioners. Much feminist economic research focuses on topics that have been neglected in the field, such as care work, intimate partner violence, or on economic theories which could be improved through better incorporation of gendered effects and interactions, such as between paid and unpaid sectors of economies. Other feminist scholars have engaged in new forms of data collection and measurement such as the Gender Empowerment Measure (GEM), and more gender-aware theories such as the capabilities approach. Feminist economics is oriented toward the social ecology of money.

Feminist economists call attention to the social constructions of traditional economics, questioning the extent to which it is positive and objective, and showing how its models and methods are biased by an exclusive attention to masculine-associated topics and a one-sided favoring of masculine-associated assumptions and methods. While economics traditionally focused on markets and masculine-associated ideas of autonomy, abstraction and logic, feminist economists call for a fuller exploration of economic life, including such "culturally feminine" topics such as family economics, and examining the importance of connections, concreteness, and emotion in explaining economic phenomena.

Many scholars including Ester Boserup, Marianne Ferber, Drucilla K. Barker, Julie A. Nelson, Marilyn Waring, Nancy Folbre, Diane Elson, Barbara Bergmann and Ailsa McKay have contributed to feminist economics. Waring's 1988 book If Women Counted is often regarded as the "founding document" of the discipline. By the 1990s feminist economics had become sufficiently recognised as an established subfield within economics to generate book and article publication opportunities for its practitioners.

== Origins and history ==
Early on, feminist ethicists, economists, political scientists, and systems scientists argued that women's traditional work (e.g. child-raising, caring for sick elders) and occupations (e.g. nursing, teaching) are systematically undervalued with respect to that of men. For example, Jane Jacobs' thesis of the "Guardian Ethic" and its contrast to the "Trader Ethic" sought to explain the undervaluing of guardianship activity, including the child-protecting, nurturing, and healing tasks that were traditionally assigned to women.

Written in 1969 and later published in the Houseworker's Handbook, Betsy Warrior's Housework: Slavery or a Labor of Love and The Source of Leisure Time presents a cogent argument that the production and reproduction of domestic labor performed by women constitutes the foundation of all economic transactions and survival; although, unremunerated and not included in the GDP. According to Warrior: "Economics, as it's presented today, lacks any basis in reality as it leaves out the very foundation of economic life. That foundation is built on women's labor; first her reproductive labor which produces every new laborer (and the first commodity, which is mother's milk and which sustains every new consumer/laborer); secondly, women's labor entails environmentally necessary cleaning, cooking to make raw materials consumable, negotiating to maintain social stability and nurturing, which prepares for market and maintains each laborer. This constitutes women's continuing industry enabling laborers to occupy every position in the work force. Without this fundamental labor and commodity there would be no economic activity nor we would have survived to continue to evolve." Warrior also notes that the unacknowledged income of men from illegal activities like arms, drugs and human trafficking, political graft, religious emoluments and various other undisclosed activities provide a rich revenue stream to men, which further invalidates GDP figures. Even in underground economies where women predominate numerically, like trafficking in humans, prostitution and domestic servitude, only a tiny fraction of the pimp's revenue filters down to the women and children he deploys. Usually the amount spent on them is merely for the maintenance of their lives and, in the case of those prostituted, some money may be spent on clothing and such accouterments as will make them more salable to the pimp's clients. For instance, focusing on just the US, according to a government sponsored report by the Urban Institute in 2014, "A street prostitute in Dallas may make as little as $5 per sex act. But pimps can take in $33,000 a week in Atlanta, where the sex business brings in an estimated $290 million per year." Warrior believes that only an inclusive, facts-based economic analysis will provide a reliable bases for future planning for environmental and reproductive/population needs.

In 1970, Ester Boserup published Woman's Role in Economic Development and provided the first systematic examination of the gendered effects of agricultural transformation, industrialization and other structural changes. This evidence illuminated the negative outcomes that these changes had for women. This work, among others, laid the basis for the broad claim that "women and men weather the storm of macroeconomic shocks, neoliberal policies, and the forces of globalization in different ways." Moreover, measures such as employment equity were implemented in developed nations in the 1970s to 1990s, but these were not entirely successful in removing wage gaps even in nations with strong equity traditions.

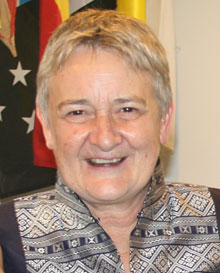
Marilyn Waring, author of If Women Counted (1988)

In 1988, Marilyn Waring published If Women Counted: A New Feminist Economics, a groundbreaking and systematic critique of the system of national accounts, the international standard of measuring economic growth, and the ways in which women's unpaid work as well as the value of nature have been excluded from what counts as productive in the economy. In the foreword to the 2014 anthology Counting on Marilyn Waring, Julie A. Nelson wrote:

"Marilyn Waring's work woke people up. She showed exactly how the unpaid work traditionally done by women has been made invisible within national accounting systems, and the damage this causes. Her book ... encouraged and influenced a wide range of work on ways, both numerical and otherwise, of valuing, preserving, and rewarding the work of care that sustains our lives. By pointing to a similar neglect of the natural environment, she also issued a wake-up call to issues of ecological sustainability that have only grown more pressing over time. In recent decades, the field of feminist economics has broadened and widened to encompass these topics and more."

Supported by formation of the Committee on the Status of Women in the Economics Profession (CSWEP) in 1972, gender-based critiques of traditional economics appeared in the 1970s and 80s. The subsequent emergence of Development Alternatives with Women for a New Era (DAWN) and the 1992 founding of the International Association for Feminist Economics (IAFFE) along with its journal Feminist Economics in 1994 encouraged the rapid growth of feminist economics.

As in other disciplines, the initial emphasis of feminist economists was to critique the established theory, methodology, and policy approaches. The critique began in microeconomics of the household and labor markets and spread to macroeconomics and international trade, ultimately extending to all areas of traditional economic analysis. Feminist economists pushed for and produced gender aware theory and analysis, broadened the focus on economics and sought pluralism of methodology and research methods.

Feminist economics shares many of its perspectives with ecological economics and the more applied field of green economy, including the focus on sustainability, nature, justice and care values.

== Critiques of traditional economics ==
Although there is no definitive list of the principles of feminist economics, feminist economists offer a variety of critiques of standard approaches in economics. For example, prominent feminist economist Paula England provided one of the earliest feminist critiques of traditional economics as she challenged the claims that:

- That interpersonal utility comparisons are impossible;
- That tastes are exogenous and unchanging;
- That actors are selfish; and
- That household heads act altruistically.

This list is not exhaustive but does represent some of the central feminist economic critiques of traditional economics, out of the wide variety of such viewpoints and critiques.

=== Normativity ===
Many feminists call attention to value judgments in economic analysis. This idea is contrary to the typical conception of economics as a positive science held by many practitioners. For example, Geoff Schneider and Jean Shackelford suggest that, as in other sciences, "the issues that economists choose to study, the kinds of questions they ask, and the type of analysis undertaken all are a product of a belief system which is influenced by numerous factors, some of them ideological in character." Similarly, Diana Strassmann comments, "All economic statistics are based on an underlying story forming the basis of the definition. In this way, narrative constructions necessarily underlie all definitions of variables and statistics. Therefore, economic research cannot escape being inherently qualitative, regardless of how it is labeled." Feminist economists call attention to the value judgements in all aspects economics and criticize its depiction as an objective science.

=== Free trade ===
A central principle of mainstream economics is that trade can make everyone better off through comparative advantage and efficiency gains from specialization and greater efficiency. Many feminist economists question this claim. Diane Elson, Caren Grown and Nilufer Cagatay explore the role that gender inequalities play in international trade and how such trade reshapes gender inequality itself. They and other feminist economists explore whose interests specific trade practices serve.

For example, they may highlight that in Africa, specialization in the cultivation of a single cash crop for export in many countries made those countries extremely vulnerable to price fluctuations, weather patterns, and pests. Feminist economists may also consider the specific gendered effects of trade-decisions. For instance, "in countries such as Kenya, men generally controlled the earnings from cash crops while women were still expected to provide food and clothing for the household, their traditional role in the African family, along with labor to produce cash crops. Thus women suffered significantly from the transition away from subsistence food production towards specialization and trade." Similarly, since women often lack economic power as business owners, they are more likely to be hired as cheap labor, often involving them in exploitative situations. These examples highlight feminist economic theory's critique of the traditional economic theory.

=== Exclusion of non-market activity ===
Feminist economics call attention to the importance of non-market activities, such as childcare and domestic work, to economic development. This stands in sharp contrast to neoclassical economics where those forms of labor are unaccounted for as "non-economic" phenomena. Including such labor in economic accounts removes substantial gender bias because women disproportionately perform those tasks. When that labor is unaccounted for in economic models, much work done by women is ignored, literally devaluing their effort.

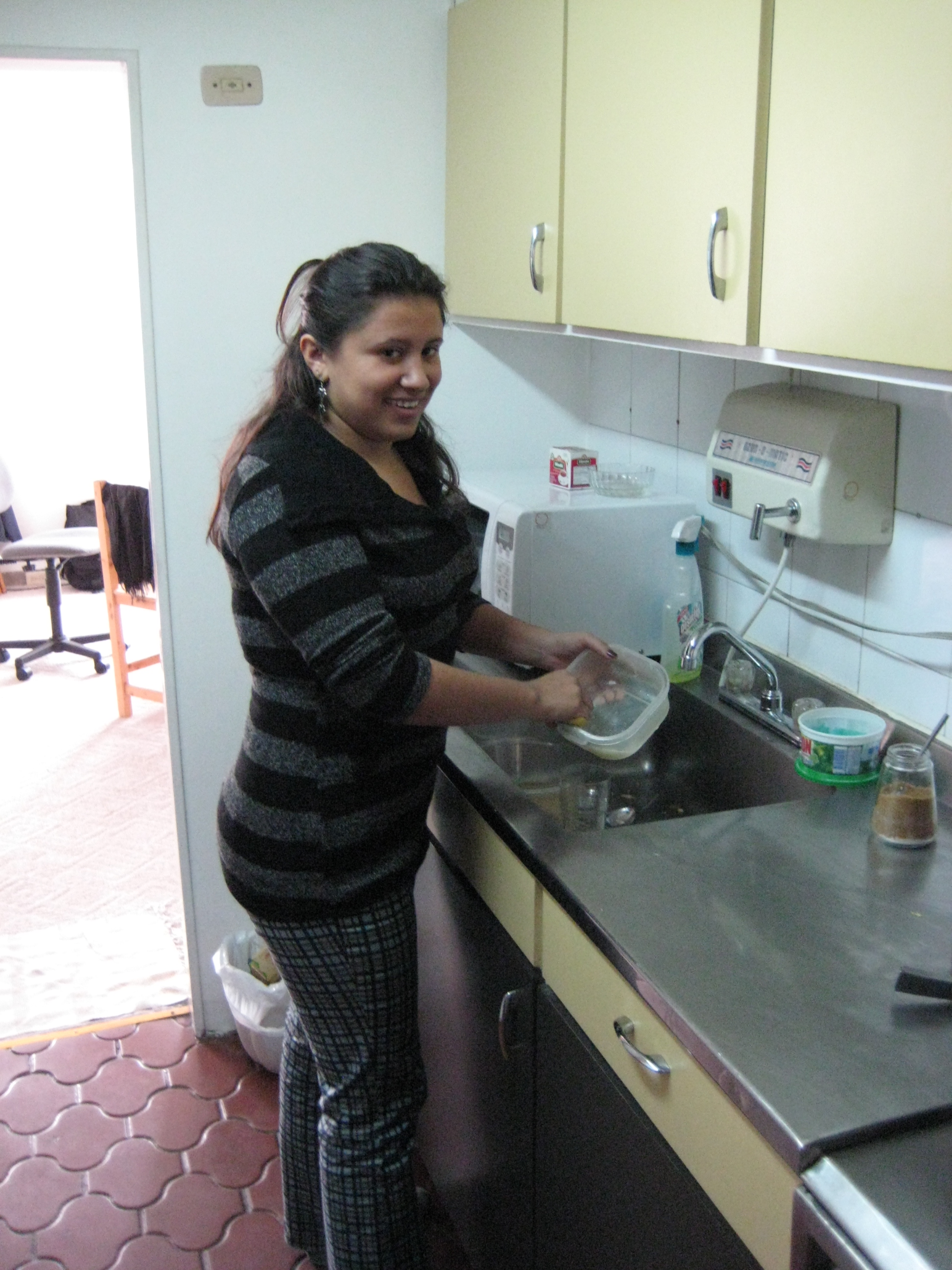
A Colombian domestic worker. Neighborhood friends and family sharing household and childcare responsibilities is an example of non-market activity performed outside of the traditional labor market.

More specifically, for example, Nancy Folbre examines the role of children as public goods and how the non-market labor of parents contributes to the development of human capital as a public service. In this sense, children are positive externality which is under-invested according to traditional analysis. Folbre indicates that this oversight partially results from failing to properly examine non-market activities.

Marilyn Waring described how the exclusion of non-market activities in the national accounting systems relied on the deliberate choice and the design of the international standard of national accounts that explicitly excluded non-market activities. In some countries, such as Norway, which had included unpaid household work in the GDP in the first half of the 20th century, it was left out in 1950 for reasons of compatibility with the new international standard.

Ailsa McKay argues for a basic income as "a tool for promoting gender-neutral social citizenship rights" partially to address these concerns.

=== Omission of power relations ===
Feminist economics often assert that power relations exist within the economy, and therefore, must be assessed in economic models in ways that they previously have been overlooked. For example, in "neoclassical texts, the sale of labor is viewed as a mutually beneficial exchange that benefits both parties. No mention is made of the power inequities in the exchange which tend to give the employer power over the employee." These power relations often favor men and there is "never any mention made of the particular difficulties that confront females in the workplace." Consequently, "Understanding power and patriarchy helps us to analyze how men-dominated economic institutions function and why females are often at a disadvantage in the workplace." Feminist economists often extend these criticisms to many aspects of the social world, arguing that power relations are an endemic and important feature of society.

=== Omission of gender and race ===
Feminist economics argue that gender and race must be considered in economic analysis. Amartya Sen argues that "the systematically inferior position of women inside and outside the household in many societies points to the necessity of treating gender as a force of its own in development analysis." He goes on to say that experiences of men and women, even within the same household, are often so different that examining economics without gender can be misleading.

Economic models can often be improved by explicitly considering gender, race, class, and caste. Julie Matthaie describes their importance: "Not only did gender and racial-ethnic differences and inequality precede capitalism, they have been built into it in key ways. In other words, every aspect of our capitalist economy is gendered and racialized; a theory and practice that ignores this is inherently flawed." Feminist economist Eiman Zein-Elabdin says racial and gender differences should be examined since both have traditionally been ignored and thus are equally described as "feminist difference." The July 2002 issue of the Feminist Economics journal was dedicated to issues of "gender, color, caste and class."

=== Exaggeration of gender differences ===
In other cases gender differences have been exaggerated, potentially encouraging unjustified stereotyping. In recent works Julie A. Nelson has shown how the idea that "women are more risk averse than men," a now-popular assertion from behavioral economics, actually rests on extremely thin empirical evidence. Conducting meta-analyses of recent studies, she demonstrates that, while statistically significant differences in measures of mean risk aversion are sometimes found, the substantive size of these group-level differences tend to be small (on the order of a fraction of a standard deviation), and many other studies fail to find a statistically significant difference at all. Yet the studies that fail to find "difference" are less likely to be published or highlighted.

In addition, claims that men and women have "different" preferences (such as for risk, competition, or altruism) often tend to be misinterpreted as categorical, that is, as applying to all women and all men, as individuals. In fact, small differences in average behavior, such as are found in some studies, are generally accompanied by large overlaps in men's and women's distributions. That is, both men and women can generally be found in the most risk-averse (or competitive or altruistic) groups, as well as in the least.

=== Homo economicus ===
The neoclassical economic model of a person is called Homo economicus, describing a person who "interacts in society without being influenced by society," because "his mode of interaction is through an ideal market," in which prices are the only necessary considerations. In this view, people are considered rational actors who engage in marginal analysis to make many or all of their decisions. Feminist economists argue that people are more complex than such models, and call for "a more holistic vision of an economic actor, which includes group interactions and actions motivated by factors other than greed." Feminist economics holds that such a reformation provides a better description of the actual experiences of both men and women in the market, arguing that mainstream economics overemphasizes the role of individualism, competition and selfishness of all actors. Instead, feminist economists like Nancy Folbre show that cooperation also plays a role in the economy.

Feminist economists also point out that agency is not available to everyone, such as children, the sick, and the frail elderly. Responsibilities for their care can compromise the agency of caregivers as well. This is a critical departure from the homo economicus model.

Moreover, feminist economists critique the focus of neoclassical economics on monetary rewards. Nancy Folbre notes, "legal rules and cultural norms can affect market outcomes in ways distinctly disadvantageous to women." This includes occupational segregation resulting in unequal pay for women. Feminist research in these areas contradicts the neoclassical description of labor markets in which occupations are chosen freely by individuals acting alone and out of their own free will. Feminist economics also includes study of norms relevant to economics, challenging the traditional view that material incentives will reliably provide the goods we want and need (consumer sovereignty), which does not hold true for many people.

Institutional economics is one means by which feminist economists improve upon the homo economicus model. This theory examines the role of institutions and evolutionary social processes in shaping economic behavior, emphasizing "the complexity of human motives and the importance of culture and relations of power." This provides a more holistic view of the economic actor than homo economicus.

The work of George Akerlof and Janet Yellen on efficiency wages based on notions of fairness provides an example of a feminist model of economic actors. In their work, agents are not hyperrational or isolated, but instead act in concert and with fairness, are capable of experiencing jealousy, and are interested in personal relationships. This work is based on empirical sociology and psychology, and suggests that wages can be influenced by fairness considerations rather than purely market forces.

=== Limited methodology ===
Economics is often thought of as "the study of how society manages its scarce resources" and as such is limited to mathematical inquiry. Traditional economists often say such an approach assures objectivity and separates economics from "softer" fields such as sociology and political science. Feminist economists, argue on the contrary that a mathematical conception of economics limited to scarce resources is a holdover from the early years of science and Cartesian philosophy, and limits economic analysis. So feminist economists often call for more diverse data collection and broader economic models.

=== Economic pedagogy ===
Feminist economists suggest that both the content and teaching style of economics courses would benefit from certain changes. Some recommend including experimental learning, laboratory sessions, individual research and more chances to "do economics." Some want more dialogue between instructors and students. Many feminist economists are urgently interested in how course content influences the demographic composition of future economists, suggesting that the "classroom climate" affects some students' perceptions of their own ability.

=== 2008 financial crisis ===
Margunn Bjørnholt and Ailsa McKay argue that the 2008 financial crisis and the response to it revealed a crisis of ideas in mainstream economics and within the economics profession, and call for a reshaping of both the economy, economic theory and the economics profession. They argue that such a reshaping should include new advances within feminist economics that take as their starting point the socially responsible, sensible and accountable subject in creating an economy and economic theories that fully acknowledge care for each other as well as the planet.

== Major areas of inquiry ==
=== Economic epistemology ===
Feminist critiques of economics include that "economics, like any science, is socially constructed." Feminist economists say that social constructs act to privilege male-identified, western, and heterosexual interpretations of economics. They generally incorporate feminist theory and frameworks to show how traditional economics communities signal expectations regarding appropriate participants, to the exclusion of outsiders. Such criticisms extend to the theories, methodologies and research areas of economics, in order to show that accounts of economic life are deeply influenced by biased histories, social structures, norms, cultural practices, interpersonal interactions, and politics.

Feminist economists often make a critical distinction that masculine bias in economics is primarily a result of gender, not sex. In other words, when feminist economists highlight the biases of mainstream economics, they focus on its social beliefs about masculinity like objectivity, separation, logical consistency, individual accomplishment, mathematics, abstraction, and lack of emotion, but not on the gender of authorities and subjects. However, the over-representation of men among economists and their subjects of study is also a concern.

=== Economic history ===
Women's weekly earnings as a percentage of men's in the U.S. by age, 1979-2005

Feminist economists say that mainstream economics has been disproportionately developed by European-descended, heterosexual, middle and upper-middle-class men, and that this has led to suppression of the life experiences of the full diversity of the world's people, especially women, children and those in non-traditional families.

Additionally, feminist economists claim that the historical bases of economics are inherently exclusionary to women. Michèle Pujol points to five specific historical assumptions about women that arose, became embedded in the formulation of economics, and continue to be used to maintain that women are different from the masculinized norms and exclude them. These include the ideas that:

- All women are married, or if not yet, they will be and all women will have children.
- All women are economically dependent on a male relative.
- All women are (and should be) housewives due to their reproductive capacities.
- Women are unproductive in the industrial workforce.
- Women are irrational, unfit economic agents, and cannot be trusted to make the right economic decisions.

Feminist economists also examine early economic thinkers' interaction or lack of interaction with gender and women's issues, showing examples of women's historical engagement with economic thought. For example, Edith Kuiper discusses Adam Smith's engagement with feminist discourse on the role of women in the eighteenth century France and England. She finds that through his writings, Smith typically supported the status quo on women's issues and "lost sight of the division of labor in the family and the contribution of women's economic work." In response, she points to Mary Collier's works such as The Woman's Labour (1739) to help understand Smith's contemporaneous experiences of women and fill in such gaps.

=== Engendering macroeconomic theories ===
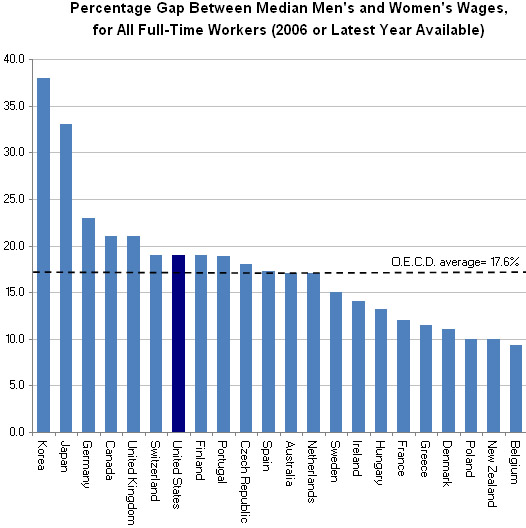
Percentage gap between median men's and women's wages, for full-time workers by OECD country, 2006. In the U.K., the most significant factors associated with the remaining gender pay gap are part-time work, education, the size of the firm a person is employed in, and occupational segregation. (Women are under-represented in managerial and high-paying professional occupations.)

Central to feminist economics is an effort to alter the theoretical modeling of the economy, to reduce gender bias and inequity. Feminist macroeconomic inquiries focus on international capital flows, fiscal austerity, deregulation and privatization, monetary policy, international trade and more. In general, these modifications take three main forms: gender disaggregation, the addition of gender-based macroeconomic variables, and the creation of a two-sector system.

==== Gender disaggregation ====
This method of economic analysis seeks to overcome gender bias by showing how men and women differ in their consumption, investment or saving behavior. Gender disaggregation strategies justify the separation of macroeconomic variables by gender. Korkut Ertürk and Nilüfer Çağatay show how the feminization of labor stimulates investment, while an increase in female activity in housework raises savings. This model highlights how gender effects macroeconomic variables and shows that economies have a higher likelihood of recovering from downturns if women participate in the labor force more, instead of devoting their time to housework.

==== Gendered macroeconomic variables ====
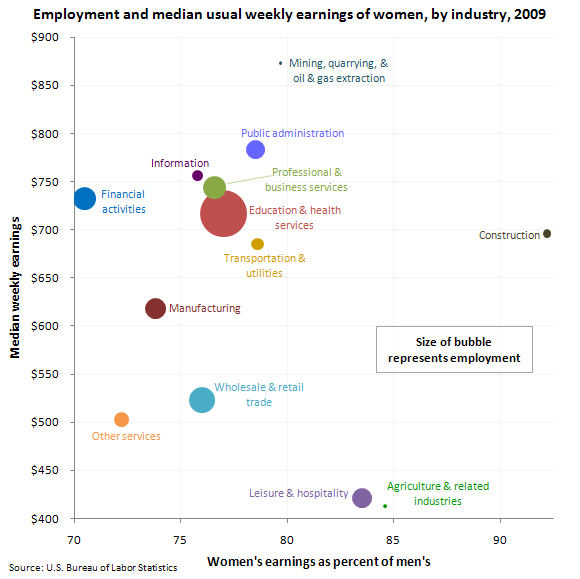
U.S. women's weekly earnings, employment, and percentage of men's earnings, by industry, 2009

This approach demonstrates the effects of gender inequalities by enhancing macroeconomic models. Bernard Walters shows that traditional neoclassical models fail to adequately assess work related to reproduction by assuming that the population and labor are determined exogenously. That fails to account for the fact that inputs are produced through caring labor, which is disproportionately performed by women. Stephen Knowels et al. use a neoclassical growth model to show that women's education has a positive statistically significant effect on labor productivity, more robust than that of men's education. In both of these cases, economists highlight and address the gender biases of macroeconomic variables to show that gender plays a significant role in models' outcomes.

==== Two-sector system ====
The two-sector system approach models the economy as two separate systems: one involving the standard macroeconomic variables, while the other includes gender-specific variables. William Darity developed a two-sector approach for low-income, farm-based economies. Darity shows that subsistence farming depended on the labor of women, while the production of income depended on the labor of both men and women in cash-crop activities. This model shows that when men control production and income, they seek to maximize income by persuading women to put additional effort into cash-crop production, causing increases in cash crops come at the expense of subsistence production.

=== Well-being ===
Many feminist economists argue economics should be focused less on mechanisms (like income) or theories (such as utilitarianism) and more on well-being, a multidimensional concept including income, health, education, empowerment and social status. They argue that economic success can not be measured only by goods or gross domestic product, but must also be measured by human well-being. Aggregate income is not sufficient to evaluate general well-being, because individual entitlements and needs must also be considered, leading feminist economists to study health, longevity, access to property, education, and related factors.

Bina Agarwal and Pradeep Panda illustrate that a woman's property status (such as owning a house or land) directly and significantly reduces her chances of experiencing domestic violence, while employment makes little difference. They argue that such immovable property increases women's self-esteem, economic security, and strengthens their fall-back positions, enhancing their options and bargaining clout. They show that property ownership is an important contributor to women's economic well-being because it reduces their susceptibility to violence.

In order to measure well-being more generally, Amartya Sen, Sakiko Fukuda-Parr, and other feminist economists helped develop alternatives to Gross Domestic Product, such as the Human Development Index. Other models of interest to feminist economists include the labor theory of value, which was most thoroughly developed in Das Kapital by Karl Marx. That model considers production as a socially constructed human project and redefines wages as means to earning a living. This refocuses economic models on human innate desires and needs as opposed to monetary incentives.

==== Human capabilities approach ====
Economists Amartya Sen and Philosopher Martha Nussbaum created the human capabilities approach as an alternative way to assess economic success rooted in the ideas of welfare economics and focused on the individual's potential to do and be what he or she may choose to value. Unlike traditional economic measures of success, focused on GDP, utility, income, assets or other monetary measures, the capabilities approach focuses on what individuals are able to do. This approach emphasizes processes as well as outcomes, and draws attention to cultural, social and material dynamics of well-being. Martha Nussbaum, expanded on the model with a more complete list of central capabilities including life, health, bodily integrity, thought, and more. In recent years, the capabilities approach has influenced the creation of new models including the UN's Human Development Index (HDI).

=== Household bargaining ===
Central to feminist economics is a different approach to the "family" and "household." In classical economics, those units are typically described as amicable and homogeneous. Gary Becker and new home economists introduced the study of "the family" to traditional economics, which usually assumes the family is a single, altruistic unit among which money is distributed equally. Others have concluded that an optimal distribution of commodities and provisions takes place within the family as a result of which they view families in the same manner as individuals. These models, according to feminist economists, "endorsed traditional expectations about the sexes," and applied individualistic rational-choice models to explain home behavior. Feminist economists modify these assumptions to account for exploitative sexual and gender relations, single-parent families, same-sex relationships, familial relations with children, and the consequences of reproduction. Specifically, feminist economists move beyond unitary household models and game theory to show the diversity of household experiences.

For example, Bina Agarwal and others have critiqued the mainstream model and helped provide a better understanding of intra-household bargaining power. Agarwal shows that a lack of power and outside options for women hinders their ability to negotiate within their families. Amartya Sen shows how social norms that devalue women's unpaid work in the household often disadvantage women in intra-household bargaining. These feminist economists argue that such claims have important economic outcomes which must be recognized within economic frameworks.

=== Care economy ===
Feminist economists join the UN and others in acknowledging care work, as a kind of work which includes all tasks involving caregiving, as central to economic development and human well-being. Feminist economists study both paid and unpaid care work. They argue that traditional analysis of economics often ignores the value of household unpaid work. Feminist economists have argued that unpaid domestic work is as valuable as paid work, so measures of economic success should include unpaid work. They have shown that women are disproportionately responsible for performing such care work.

Sabine O'Hara argues that care is the basis for all economic activity and market economies, concluding that "everything needs care," not only people, but animals and things. She highlights the sustaining nature of care services offered outside the formal economy.

Riane Eisler claims we need the economic system, to give visibility to the essential work of caring for people and caring for nature. Measuring GDP only includes productive work and leaves out the life sustaining activities of the following three sectors: the household economy, the natural economy and the volunteer community economy. These sectors are where most of the care work is done. By changing existing economic indicators in a way that they would also measure the contributions of the three aforementioned sectors we can get a more accurate reflection of economic reality. She proposes social wealth indicators. According to her these indicators would show the enormous return on investment (ROI) in caring for people and nature. Psychological studies have shown that when people feel good, and they feel good when they feel cared for, they are more productive and more creative (example case study). As a result, the care economy has positive externalities such as increasing the quality of human capital. Most nations not only fail to support the care work that is still predominantly done by women, but we live in the world with gendered system of values. Everything that is associated with women or femininity is devalued or even marginalised.

Feminist economists have also highlighted power and inequality issues within families and households. For example, Randy Albelda shows that responsibility for care work influences the time poverty experienced by single mothers in the United States. Similarly, Sarah Gammage examines the effects of unpaid care work performed by women in Guatemala. The work of the Equality Studies Department at University College Dublin such as that of Sara Cantillon has focused on inequalities of domestic arrangements within even affluent households.

While much care work is performed in the home, it may also be done for pay. As such, feminist economics examine its implications, including the increasing involvement of women in paid care work, the potential for exploitation, and effects on the lives of care workers.

Systemic study of the ways women's work is measured, or not measured at all, have been undertaken by Marilyn Waring (see If Women Counted) and others in the 1980s and 1990s. These studies began to justify different means of determining value — some of which influenced the theory of social capital and individual capital, that emerged in the late 1990s and, along with ecological economics, influenced modern human development theory. (See also the entry on Gender and Social Capital.)

=== Unpaid work ===
Unpaid work can include domestic work, care work, subsistence work, unpaid market labor and voluntary work. There is no clear consensus on the definition of these categories. But broadly speaking, these kinds of work can be seen as contributing to the reproduction of society.

Domestic work is maintenance of the home, and is usually universally recognizable, e.g. doing the laundry. Care work is looking "after a relative or friend who needs support because of age, physical or learning disability, or illness, including mental illness;" this also includes raising children. Care work also involves "close personal or emotional interaction." Also included in this category is "self-care," in which leisure time and activities are included. Subsistence work is work done in order to meet basic needs, such as collecting water, but does not have market values assigned to it. Although some of these efforts "are categorized as productive activities according to the latest revision of the international System of National Accounts (SNA) ... [they] are poorly measured by most surveys." Unpaid market work is "the direct contributions of unpaid family members to market work that officially belongs to another member of the household." Voluntary work is usually work done for non-household members, but in return for little to no remuneration.

==== System of National Accounts ====
Each country measures its economic output according to the System of National Accounts (SNA), sponsored mainly by the United Nations (UN), but implemented mainly by other organizations such as the European Commission, the International Monetary Fund (IMF), the Organisation for Economic Co-operation and Development (OECD), and the World Bank. The SNA recognizes that unpaid work is an area of interest, but "unpaid household services are excluded from [its] production boundary." Feminist economists have criticized the SNA for this exclusion, because by leaving out unpaid work, basic and necessary labor is ignored.

Even accounting measures intended to recognize gender disparities are criticized for ignoring unpaid work. Two such examples are the Gender-related Development Index (GDI) and the Gender Empowerment Measure (GEM), neither of which include much unpaid work. So feminist economics calls for a more comprehensive index which includes participation in unpaid work.

In more recent years there has been increasing attention to this issue, such as recognition of unpaid work within SNA reports and a commitment by the UN to the measurement and valuation of unpaid work, emphasizing care work done by women. This goal was restated at the 1995 UN Fourth World Conference on Women in Beijing.

==== Measurement of unpaid work ====
The method most widely used to measure unpaid work is gathering information on time use, which has "been implemented by at least 20 developing countries and more are underway" as of 2006. Time use measurement involves collecting data on how much time men and women spend on a daily, weekly, or monthly basis on certain activities that fall under the categories of unpaid work.

Techniques to gather this data include surveys, in-depth interviews, diaries, and participant observation. Proponents of time use diaries believe that this method "generate[s] more detailed information and tend[s] to capture greater variation than predetermined questions." However, others argue that participant observation, "where the researcher spends lengthy periods of time in households helping out and observing the labor process," generates more accurate information because the researcher can ascertain whether or not those studied are accurately reporting what activities they perform.

===== Accuracy =====
The first problem of measuring unpaid work is the issue of collecting accurate information. This is always a concern in research studies, but is particularly difficult when evaluating unpaid work. "Time-use surveys may reveal relatively little time devoted to unpaid direct care activities [because] the demands of subsistence production in those countries are great," and may not take into account multitasking — for example, a mother may collect wood fuel while a child is in the same location, so the child is in her care while she is performing other work. Usually such indirect care should be included, as it is in many time use studies. But it is not always, and as a result some studies may undervalue the amount of certain types of unpaid work. Participant observation has been criticized for being "so time-consuming that it can only focus on small numbers of households," and thus limited in the amount of information it can be used to gather.

All data gathering involves difficulties with the potential inaccuracy of research subjects' reports. For instance, when "people doing domestic labor have no reason to pay close attention to the amount of time tasks take ... they [may] often underestimate time spent in familiar activities." Measuring time can also be problematic because "the slowest and most inefficient workers [appear to carry] the greatest workload." Time use in assessing childcare is criticized as "easily obscur[ing] gender differences in workload. Men and women may both put in the same amount of time being responsible for children but as participant observation studies have shown, many men are more likely to 'babysit' their children while doing something for themselves, such as watching TV. Men's standards of care may be limited to ensuring the children are not hurt. Dirty diapers may be ignored or deliberately left until the mother returns." A paradoxical aspect of this problem is that those most burdened may not be able to participate in the studies: "It is usually those women with the heaviest work loads who choose not to participate in these studies." In general, measurement of time causes "some of the most demanding aspects of unpaid work [to be unexplored] and the premise that time is an appropriate tool for measuring women's unpaid work goes unchallenged." Surveys have also been criticized for lacking "depth and complexity" as questions cannot be specifically tailored to particular circumstances.

===== Comparability =====
A second problem is the difficulty of comparisons across cultures. "Comparisons across countries are currently hampered by differences in activity classification and nomenclature." In-depth surveys may be the only way to get necessary information desired, but they make it difficult to perform cross-cultural comparisons. The lack of adequate universal terminology in discussing unpaid work is an example. "Despite increasing recognition that domestic labor is work, existing vocabularies do not easily convey the new appreciations. People still tend to talk about work and home as if they were separate spheres. 'Working mothers' are usually assumed to be in the paid labor force, despite feminist assertions that 'every mother is a working mother.' There are no readily accepted terms to express different work activities or job titles. Housewife, home manager, homemaker are all problematic and none of them conveys the sense of a woman who juggles both domestic labor and paid employment."

===== Complexity =====
A third problem is the complexity of domestic labor and the issues of separating unpaid work categories. Time use studies now take multitasking issues into account, separating primary and secondary activities. However, not all studies do this, and even those that do may not take into account "the fact that frequently several tasks are done simultaneously, that tasks overlap, and that the boundaries between work and relationships are often unclear. How does a woman determine her primary activity when she is preparing dinner while putting the laundry away, making coffee for her spouse, having coffee and chatting with him, and attending to the children?" Some activities may not even be considered work, such as playing with a child (this has been categorized as developmental care work) and so may not be included in a study's responses. As mentioned above, child supervision (indirect care work) may not be construed as an activity at all, which "suggests that activity-based surveys should be supplemented by more stylized questions regarding care responsibilities" as otherwise such activities can be undercounted. In the past, time use studies tended to measure only primary activities, and "respondents doing two or more things at once were asked to indicate which was the more important." This has been changing in more recent years.

==== Valuation of time ====
Feminist economists point out three main ways of determining the value of unpaid work: the opportunity cost method, replacement cost method, and input-output cost method. The opportunity cost method "uses the wage a person would earn in the market" to see how much value their labor-time has. This method extrapolates from the opportunity cost idea in mainstream economics.

The second method of valuation uses replacement costs. In simple terms, this is done by measuring the amount of money a third-party would make for doing the same work if it was part of the market. In other words, the value of a person cleaning the house in an hour is the same as the hourly wage for a maid. Within this method there are two approaches: the first is a generalist replacement cost method, which examines if "it would be possible, for example, to take the wage of a general domestic worker who could perform a variety of tasks including childcare". The second approach is the specialist replacement cost method, which aims to "distinguish between the different household tasks and choose replacements accordingly".

The third method is the input-output cost method. This looks at both the costs of inputs and includes any value added by the household. "For instance, the value of time devoted to cooking a meal can be determined by asking what it could cost to purchase a similar meal (the output) in the market, then subtracting the cost of the capital goods, utilities and raw materials devoted to that meal. This remainder represents the value of the other factors of production, primarily labor." These types of models try to value household output by determining monetary values for the inputs — in the dinner example, the ingredients and production of the meal — and compares those with market equivalents.

===== Difficulty establishing monetary levels =====
One criticism of time valuation concerns the choice of monetary levels. How should unpaid work be valued when more than one activity is being performed or more than one output is produced? Another issue concerns differences in quality between market and household products. Some feminist economists take issue with using the market system to determine values for a variety of reasons: it may lead to the conclusion that the market provides perfect substitutes for non-market work; the wage produced in the market for services may not accurately reflect the actual opportunity cost of time spent in household production; and the wages used in valuation methods come from industries where wages are already depressed because of gender inequalities, and so will not accurately value unpaid work. A related argument is that the market "accepts existing sex/gender divisions of labor and pay inequalities as normal and unproblematic. With this basic assumption underlying their calculations, the valuations produced serve to reinforce gender inequalities rather than challenge women's subordination."

===== Criticisms of opportunity cost =====
Criticisms are leveled against each method of valuation. The opportunity cost method "depends on the lost earnings of the worker so that a toilet cleaned by a lawyer has much greater value than one cleaned by a janitor", which means that the value varies too drastically. There are also issues with the uniformity of this method not just across multiple individuals, but also for a single person: it "may not be uniform across the entire day or across days of the week." There is also the issue of whether any enjoyment of the activity should be deducted from the opportunity cost estimate.

===== Difficulties with replacement cost =====
The replacement cost method also has its critics. What types of jobs should be used as substitutes? For example, should childcare activities "be calculated using the wages of daycare workers or child psychiatrists?" This relates to the problem of depressed wages in female-dominated industries, and whether using such jobs as an equivalent leads to the undervaluing of unpaid work. Some have argued that education levels ought to be comparable, for example, "the value of time that a college-educated parent spends reading aloud to a child should be ascertained by asking how much it would cost to hire a college-educated worker to do the same, not by an average housekeeper's wage."

===== Difficulties with input-output methods =====
Critiques against the input-output methods include the difficulty of identifying and measuring household outputs, and the issues of variation of households and these effects.

==== Findings and economic effects of unpaid work ====
In 2011, a wide-ranging study was conducted to determine the amount of unpaid household work engaged in by residents of different countries. This study, incorporating the results of time-use surveys from 26 OECD countries, found that, in each country, the average hours spent per day on unpaid household work was between about 2 to 4 hours per day. As domestic work is widely seen as "women's work", the majority of it is performed by women, even for women who also participate in the labor force. One study found that, when adding the time spent on unpaid household work to the time spent engaging in paid work, married mothers accumulate 84 hours of work per week, compared to 79 hours per week for unmarried mothers, and 72 hours per week for all fathers, whether married or not.

Efforts to calculate the true economic value of unpaid work, which is not included in measures such as gross domestic product, have shown that this value is enormous. In the United States, it has been estimated to be between 20 and 50%, meaning that the true value of unpaid work is trillions of dollars per year. For other countries, the percentage of GDP may be even higher, such as the United Kingdom, where is may be as high as 70%. Because this unpaid work is largely done by women and is unreported in economic indicators, it results in these contributions by women being devalued in a society.

=== The formal economy ===
Research into the causes and consequences of occupational segregation, the gender pay gap, and the "glass ceiling" have been a significant part of feminist economics. While conventional neoclassical economic theories of the 1960s and 1970s explained these as the result of free choices made by women and men who simply had different abilities or preferences, feminist economists pointed out the important roles played by stereotyping, sexism, patriarchal beliefs and institutions, sexual harassment, and discrimination. The rationales for, and the effects of, anti-discrimination laws adopted in many industrial countries beginning in the 1970s, has also been studied.

Women moved in large numbers into previous male bastions — especially professions like medicine and law — during the last decades of the 20th century. The gender pay gap remains and is shrinking more slowly. Feminist economists such as Marilyn Power, Ellen Mutari and Deborah M. Figart have examined the gender pay gap and found that wage setting procedures are not primarily driven by market forces, but instead by the power of actors, cultural understandings of the value of work and what constitutes a proper living, and social gender norms. Consequently, they assert that economic models must take these typically exogenous variables into account.

While overt employment discrimination by sex remains a concern of feminist economists, in recent years more attention has been paid to discrimination against caregivers—those women, and some men, who give hands-on care to children or sick or elderly friends or relatives. Because many business and government policies were designed to accommodate the "ideal worker" (that is, the traditional male worker who had no such responsibilities) rather than caregiver-workers, inefficient and inequitable treatment has resulted.

=== Globalization ===
Feminist economists' work on globalization is diverse and multifaceted. But much of it is tied together through detailed and nuanced studies of the ways in which globalization affects women in particular and how these effects relate to socially just outcomes. Often country case studies are used for these data. Some feminist economists focus on policies involving the development of globalization. For example, Lourdes Benería argues that economic development in the Global South depends in large part on improved reproductive rights, gender equitable laws on ownership and inheritance, and policies that are sensitive to the proportion of women in the informal economy. Additionally, Nalia Kabeer discusses the impacts of a social clause that would enforce global labor standards through international trade agreements, drawing on fieldwork from Bangladesh. She argues that although these jobs may appear exploitative, for many workers in those areas they present opportunities and ways to avoid more exploitative situations in the informal economy.

Alternatively, Suzanne Bergeron, for example, raises examples of studies that illustrate the multifaceted effects of globalization on women, including Kumudhini Rosa's study of Sri Lankan, Malaysian, and Philippine, workers in free trade zones as an example of local resistance to globalization. Women there use their wages to create women's centers aimed at providing legal and medical services, libraries and cooperative housing, to local community members. Such efforts, Bergeron highlights, allow women the chance to take control of economic conditions, increase their sense of individualism, and alter the pace and direction of globalization itself.

In other cases, feminist economists work on removing gender biases from the theoretical bases of globalization itself. Suzanne Bergeron, for example, focuses on the typical theories of globalization as the "rapid integration of the world into one economic space" through the flow of goods, capital, and money, in order to show how they exclude some women and the disadvantaged. She argues that traditional understandings of globalization over-emphasize the power of global capital flows, the uniformity of globalization experiences across all populations, and technical and abstract economic processes, and therefore depict the political economy of globalization inappropriately. She highlights the alternative views of globalization created by feminists. First, she describes how feminists may de-emphasize the idea of the market as "a natural and unstoppable force," instead depicting the process of globalization as alterable and movable by individual economic actors including women. She also explains that the concept of globalization itself is gender biased, because its depiction as "dominant, unified, [and] intentional" is inherently masculinized and misleading. She suggests that feminists critique such narratives by showing how a "global economy" is highly complex, de-centered and unclear.

=== Degrowth and Ecological economics ===
Feminist and ecological economics so far have not engaged with one another much. argue for the degrowth approach as a useful critique of the devaluation of care and nature by the "growth-based capitalist economic paradigm". They argue that the growth paradigm perpetuates existing gender and environmental injustices and seek to mitigate it with a degrowth work-sharing proposal.

Scholars in the paradigm of degrowth point out that the contemporary economic imaginary considers time as a scarce resource to be allocated efficiently, while in the domestic and care sector time use depends on the rhythm of life. (D’Alisa et al. 2014: Degrowth. A Vocabulary for a New Era, New York, NY: Routledge.) Joan Tronto (1993: Moral Boundaries: A Political Argument for an Ethic of Care, New York, NY: Routledge.) divides the care process in four phases: caring about, taking care of, care-giving and care-receiving. These acquire different meanings when used describing the actions of males and females.

Degrowth proposes to put care at the center of society, thus calling for a radical rethinking of human relations. It should be pointed out that degrowth is a concept that originated in the global north and is mainly directed towards a reduction of the economic (and therefore material) throughput of affluent societies. Environmental injustices linked to gender injustices are embedded in "Green Growth" due to its inability to dematerialize production processes, and these injustices are perpetuated through the Green Growth narrative and through its consequences. Ecological processes as well as caring activities are similarly, systematically devalued by the dominating industrial and economic paradigms. This can be explained by the arbitrary boundary between the monetized and the maintaining that remains largely unchallenged. Degrowth presents itself as an alternative to this dualistic view. If designed in a gender-sensitive way that recenters society around care could have the potential to alleviate environmental injustices while promoting greater gender equality.

== Methodology ==
=== Interdisciplinary data collection ===
Many feminist economists challenge the perception that only "objective" (often presumed to be quantitative) data are valid. Instead, they say economists should enrich their analysis by using data sets generated from other disciplines or through increased use of qualitative methods. Additionally, many feminist economists propose utilizing non-traditional data collection strategies such as "utilizing growth accounting frameworks, conducting empirical tests of economic theories, developing country case studies, and pursuing research at the conceptual and empirical levels."

Interdisciplinary data collection looks at systems from a specific moral position and viewpoint instead of attempting the perspective of a neutral observer. The intention is not to create a more "subjective" methodology, but to counter biases in existing methodologies, by recognizing that all explanations for world phenomena arise from socially-influenced viewpoints. Feminist economists say too many theories claim to present universal principles but actually present a masculine viewpoint in the guise of a "view from nowhere", so more varied sources of data collection are needed to mediate those issues.

=== Ethical judgment ===
Feminist economists depart from traditional economics in that they say "ethical judgments are a valid, inescapable, and in fact desirable part of economic analysis." For example, Lourdes Beneria argues that judgments about policies leading to greater well-being should be central to economic analysis. Similarly, Shahra Razavi says better understanding of care work "would allow us to shift our priorities from 'making money' or 'making stuff' to 'making livable lives' and 'enriching networks of care and relationship'" which should be central to economics.

=== Country case studies ===
Often feminist economists use country-level or smaller case studies focused on developing and often understudied countries or populations. For example, Michael Kevane and Leslie C. Gray examine how gendered social norms are central to understanding agricultural activities in Burkina Faso. Cristina Carrasco and Arantxa Rodriquez examine the care economy in Spain to suggest that women's entrance into the labor market requires more equitable caregiving responsibilities. Such studies show the importance of local social norms, government policies and cultural situations. Feminist economists see such variation as a crucial factor to be included in economics.

=== Alternative measures of success ===
Feminist economists call for a shift in how economic success is measured. These changes include an increased focus on a policy's ability to bring society toward social justice and improve people's lives, through specific goals including distributive fairness, equity, the universal provisioning of needs, elimination of poverty, freedom from discrimination and the protection of human capabilities.

==== Human Development Index (HDI) ====
World map by quartiles of Human Development Index in 2011: Very High (developed country) / Low (developing country); High (developing country) / Data unavailable; Medium (developing country)

Feminist economists often support use of the Human Development Index as a composite statistic in order to assess countries by their overall level of human development, as opposed to other measures. The HDI takes into account a broad array of measures beyond monetary considerations including life expectancy, literacy, education, and standards of living for all countries worldwide.

==== Gender-related Development Index (GDI) ====
The Gender-related Development Index (GDI) was introduced in 1995 in the Human Development Report written by the United Nations Development Program in order to add a gender-sensitive dimension to the Human Development Index. The GDI takes into account not only the average or general level of well-being and wealth within a given country, but also how this wealth and well-being is distributed between different groups within society, especially between genders. However, feminist economists do not universally agree on the use of the GDI and some offer improvements to it.

==== Social Institutions and Gender Index (SIGI) ====
The Social Institutions and Gender Index (SIGI) is a recently developed measure of gender inequality calculated by analyzing social institutions, societal practices, and legal norms and how these factors largely frame gender norms within a society. By combining these sources of inequality, SIGI is able to penalize high levels of inequality in each of the applicable dimensions, allowing for only partial compensation by the gaps between the remaining dimensions and the highly inequitable one. Through its analysis of the institutional sources of gender inequality in over 100 countries, SIGI has been proven to add new insights into outcomes for women, even when other factors such as religion and region of the world are controlled for. SIGI rankings largely mirror those of the HDI, with countries such as Portugal and Argentina leading the pack, while countries like Afghanistan and Sudan are significantly behind.

== Organizations ==
Feminist economics continues to become more widely recognized and reputed as evidenced by the numerous organizations dedicated to it or widely influenced by its principles.

=== International Association for Feminist Economics ===
Formed in 1992, the International Association for Feminist Economics (IAFFE), is independent of the American Economic Association (AEA) and seeks to challenge the masculine biases in neoclassical economics. While the majority of members are economists, it is open "not only to female and male economists but to academics from other fields, as well as activists who are not academics" and currently has over 600 members in 64 countries. Although its founding members were mostly based in the US, a majority of IAFFE's current members are based outside of the US. In 1997, IAFFE gained Non-Governmental Organization status in the United Nations.

=== Feminist Economics journal ===
Feminist Economics, edited by Diana Strassmann of Rice University and Günseli Berik of the University of Utah, is a peer-reviewed journal established to provide an open forum for dialogue and debate about feminist economic perspectives. The journal endorses a normative agenda to promote policies that will better the lives of the world's people, both women and men. In 1997, the journal was awarded the Council of Editors and Learned Journals (CELJ) Award as Best New Journal. The 2007 ISI Social Science Citation Index ranked the journal Feminist Economics 20th out of 175 among economics journals and 2nd out of 27 among Women's Studies journals.

== Criticism ==
Critiques of feminist economics have been articulated by several scholars from different methodological and theoretical traditions. Steven Horwitz has examined feminist economics from the perspective of Austrian economics, arguing that its emphasis on contextual and normative analysis departs from the subjectivist and process-oriented foundations of the Austrian tradition and questioning whether feminist economics offers a coherent alternative framework for explaining market coordination and individual choice.

Karen I. Vaughn has similarly advanced a methodological critique, contending that feminist economics challenges the standard analytical assumptions of mainstream economics particularly the use of abstraction and formal modeling but does not always provide clear criteria for theory testing or policy evaluation, raising concerns about comparability with established economic approaches.

scholars like Deirdre McCloskey have advocated for a 'humanomics' that incorporates feminist insights into classical liberal thought, recent research by N. Robert Branch (2025) suggests that certain radical feminist labor frameworks may act as 'artificial interferences' that constrain market efficiency and the spontaneous order of human capital allocation.

From a historical and conceptual standpoint, Hülya Derya has reviewed and synthesized a wide range of critical responses to feminist economics, noting that critics from neoclassical and other mainstream traditions frequently argue that its broadened focus on care work, social reproduction, and power relations risks weakening the analytical boundaries of the discipline and complicating integration with conventional policy frameworks.

== Graduate programs ==
A small, but growing number of graduate programs around the world offer courses and concentrations in feminist economics. (Unless otherwise noted below, these offerings are in departments of economics.)

- American University
- School of Public Policy and Administration at Carleton University
- Colorado State University
- Institute of Social Studies
- Gender Institute of the London School of Economics
- Makerere University
- University of Massachusetts Amherst
- The Masters in Applied Economics and Public Policy programs at the University of Massachusetts Boston
- University of Nebraska–Lincoln
- The New School for Social Research
- University of Reading
- Roosevelt University
- Department of Women's and Gender Studies at Rutgers University
- Discipline of Political Economy at the University of Sydney
- University of Utah
- York University (Toronto)
- Wright State University

== See also ==
- Family economics
- Critique of political economy
- Feminism and society
- Feminist Economics (journal)
- Gender equality, or gender equity
- Gender mainstreaming
- Intra-household bargaining
- Material feminism
- Time use
- List of feminist economists
- Who Cooked Adam Smith's Dinner?
