= Pujol =

Pujol is a Catalan word meaning small hill. It may refer to:

- Pujol (restaurant), Mexico City, Mexico

== People with the surname ==
- Antonio Pujol (1913–1995), Mexican painter
- Catherine Pujol (born 1960), French politician
- Edson Leal Pujol (born 1955), Brazilian Army General and Brazilian Army Commander (2018–2021)
- Emilio Pujol (1886–1980), Spanish composer, musicologist and classical guitar teacher
- Grégory Pujol (born 1980), French footballer
- Henri Pujol, French oncologist
- Joan Pau Pujol (1570–1626), Catalan and Spanish composer
- Jordi Pujol (born 1930), president of the Generalitat de Catalunya 1980–2003
- Juan Pujol García (1912–1988), double agent working for the British in World War II
- Laetitia Pujol (born 1975), French ballet dancer
- Le Pétomane (Joseph Pujol, 1857–1945), French performer
- Máximo Diego Pujol (born 1957), Argentine guitarist and composer
- Marc Pujol (born 1982), Andorran footballer
- Michèle Pujol (1951–1997), French-Canadian feminist, economist professor and human rights activist
- Norma Pujol (born 1988), Catalan politician
- Óscar Pujol (born 1983), Spanish road cyclist

== See also ==
- Pujols (disambiguation)
- Puyol, a surname
