= Shahra Razavi =

Iranian-born academic (b. 1963)

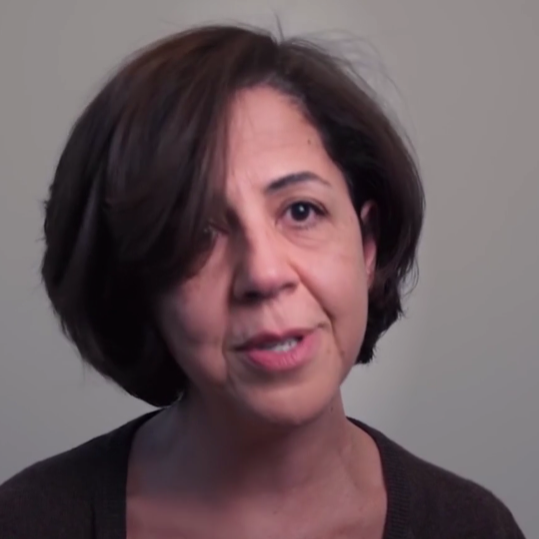
- Born: 1963
- Education: London School of Economics, University of Oxford
- Employers: UN Women (2013–); United Nations Research Institute For Social Development (1993–2013); University of Bern (2012–)

Shahra Razavi (Shahrashoub Razavi) is an Iranian-born academic and senior United Nations official specialising in gender and social development. A graduate of the London School of Economics and Oxford University, Razavi is currently Director of the Social Protection Department of the International Labour Organisation in Geneva, Switzerland.

== Biography ==
Razavi obtained a Bachelor of Science from the London School of Economics. She completed a master's degree and Doctorate of Philosophy at St Anthony's College, University of Oxford.

From 1993 to 2013, Razavi was Research Coordinator at the United Nations Research Institute for Social Development (UNRISD). Razavi praised the 2012 World Development Report's proposed microeconomic reforms to tackle economic gender inequality, but criticised the report for not addressing the ways in which macroeconomic policies disadvantaged women, who make up a majority of smallholders. As a guest contributor, Razavi presented the sociological and economic analysis of the caretaker role of women on the journal of the National Institute of Population and Social Security Research in Japan. This evaluated and lead to further discussion on the family-centered Care Diamond social welfare scheme the Japanese government pioneers among countries with larger aged population of baby-boomers and declining birthrates. In 2012, Ravazi went to the Interdisciplinary Centre for Gender Studies (ICGS), the University of Bern, as a visiting professor to also work with Brigitte Schnegg, a Swiss feminist historian and the founder of the centre.

== Positions at the United Nations ==
In June 2013, Razavi was appointed as the Chief of Research and Data at UN Women. UN Women and its flagship report, Progress of the World's Women 2019-2020: Families in a Changing World was published under the direction of Razavi which corresponds to UN goals of SDGs for economic, labor, women issues. The discussion on the roles of women in the family was expanded into other focal points along with international migration pointing out the success of Indonesian government drawing a legislature in 2017, addressing the needs of women citizens working outside of the nation, or approximately 4.5 million work forces (2016) who would be granted social security programs and gender equality, or could sought protections against trafficking and violence. Intimate partner violence was discussed in the light of working opportunities for husband or the male leader of the household, especially for migrants. Razavi's research has also explored issues such as unpaid labor and the economic burden placed on women internationally. The debate on SDGs would continue in Ravazi's article in Global Policy

Razavi is on the editorial/advisory boards of the following journals: Feminist Economics (Associate Editors), Global Social Policy (International Advisory Board) and Journal of Peasant Studies (International Advisory Board).

== Publications ==
- Razavi, Shahra (2019). "Indicators as Substitute for Policy Contestation and Accountability? Some Reflections on the 2030 Agenda from the Perspective of Gender Equality and Women's Rights". Global Policy. 10 (S1): 149–152. doi:10.1111/1758-5899.12633. ISSN 1758-5899. Towards achieving SDGs.
- Shahra Razavi and Silke Staab, ed. (2012). Global Variations in the Political and Social Economy of Care: Worlds Apart. Routledge. ISBN 978-0-415-52250-2.
- Razavi, Shahra; Jenichen, Anne (2010). "The Unhappy Marriage of Religion and Politics: problems and pitfalls for gender equality". Third World Quarterly. 31 (6): 833–850. doi:10.1080/01436597.2010.502700. JSTOR 27896584. PMID 20857564. S2CID 24578787.
- Shahra Razavi, ed. (2009). The Gendered Impacts of Liberalization: Towards "Embedded Liberalism"?. Routledge. ISBN 978-1-135-91120-1.
- Molyneux, Maxine; Razavi, Shahra (2006). Institut de recherche des Nations Unies pour le développement social (ed.). Beijing Plus 10 : an ambivalent record on gender justice. Occasional paper - UNRISD (in English, French, and Spanish). Geneva: United Nations Research Institute for Social Development. OCLC 493131120.ISBN 9290850698, 9789290850694. The Beijing Plus 10 Review Process.
- Maxine Molyneux and Shahra Razavi, ed. (2002). Gender Justice, Development, and Rights. Oxford University Press. ISBN 978-0-19-925645-7.
  - Molyneux, Maxine; Razavi, Shahra; Danloy, Caroline (2000). Instituto De Investigaciones De Las Naciones Unidas Para El Desarrollo Social. Workshop (ed.). "Gender justice, development and rights : substantiating rights in a disabling environment : report of the UNRISD Workshop, New York, 3 June 2000". Conference News. Geneva: UNRISD. A part of the UNRISD's contribution to the Beijing Plus 5 Review Process.
- Miller, Carol; Razavi, Shahrashoub (1998). Missionaries and mandarins: feminist engagement with development institutions. Intermediate Technology Publications in association with the United Nations Research Institute for Social Development. ISBN 978-1-85339-434-8.
