= Pujols (disambiguation) =

Albert Pujols (born 1980) is a Dominican-American baseball player.

Pujols (Eastern Catalan: [puˈʒɔls]) may also refer to:

== People ==
- Francesc Pujols (1882–1962), Catalan writer and philosopher
- Luis Pujols (born 1955), Major League Baseball player

== Places ==
- Pujols, Gironde, a commune in Gironde, France
- Pujols, Lot-et-Garonne, a commune in Lot-et-Garonne, France
- Les Pujols, a commune in Ariège, France

== See also ==
- Pujol (disambiguation)
- Pooholes
- Pujols-sur-Ciron, a commune in Gironde, France
- Puyol
- US Pujols XIII, a French Rugby club
