= Oduro =

Oduro is a surname. Notable people with the surname include:

- Abena Oduro (born 1959), Ghanaian economist
- Akwasi Oduro (born 1987), Belgian footballer
- Christabel Oduro (born 1992), Canadian soccer player
- David Oduro (born 2006), Ghanaian footballer
- Dominic Oduro (born 1985), Ghanaian footballer
- Josh Oduro (born 2000), American basketball player
- Stephen Oduro (born 1983), Ghanaian footballer
