= Abena Oduro =

Ghanaian economist

- Born: Abena Frempongmaa Daagye Oduro; 10 February 1959 (age 67)
- Education: University of Glasgow
- Occupation: Vice Dean of Faculty of Social Science Director of the Centre for Policy Analysis Associate Professor of Economics
- Employer: University of Ghana, Legon
- Known for: Trade Policy, Poverty and Gender Analysis, Asset Ownership, International Economics, Gender Economics

Abena Frempongmaa Daagye Oduro (born 10 February 1959) is the Vice Dean of the Faculty of Social Science at the University of Ghana where she also holds the position of Associate Professor of the Department of Economics. Having had 30 years of experience teaching, her areas of specialization are centred around gender and asset management, international economics, poverty analysis, macroeconomic theory and trade policy. Abena Oduro is the first Vice President of the Association for the Advancement of African Women Economists (AAAWE) where Professor of Economics in University of Kansas, Elizabeth Asiedu, is the founder and president. She is also the president elect of the International Association for Feminist Economics (IAFFE), her tenure will be 2021 to 2022.

== Education ==
Abena Oduro, a Ghanaian national, obtained her O-levels and A-levels at Aburi Girls Secondary School and Wesley Girls High School respectively, both located in Ghana. In 1978, she went on to further her education at the University of Glasgow, where she received an M.A.(Hons) First Class in Political Economy and Geography. She then stayed on in the University of Glasgow to obtain an M.Litt in Economics in 1982 and started her PhD program (1983–1987) which she did not complete. Oduro was awarded for her academic performance through The Royal Scottish Geographical Medal for Outstanding Performance (1982) and the University of Glasgow Scholarship (1983).

== Professional experience and affiliations ==
Abena Oduro is currently a Senior Economics Lecturer in the University of Ghana, where she has been working since 1989 teaching macroeconomic theory, international economics and international trade theory in the undergraduate and post-graduate levels. In 1999, she was appointed as the Project Officer for the Centre for Policy Analysis (CEPA) till 2001 where she went on to be a Research Fellow in this same organization until 2006. While holding this position, she became a visiting lecturer for the Council on African Studies at Yale University in 2003.

Furthermore, aside being the Vice Dean of the Faculty Social Studies, Abena Oduro is also the Director of the Centre for Social Policy Studies in the University of Ghana and the Co-Director for the Merian Institute for Advanced Studies in Africa (MIASA) which is an organization setup to create a platform for scholars within the Social Science field in Sub Saharan Africa to share and popularize their research. She is also the associate editor of Feminist Economics and a co-editor for the Engendering Economic Policy in Africa issue (2015).

Oduro is part of the African Economic Research Consortium, American Economic Association and the International Association for Feminist Economics where she holds active membership roles in all of these groups respectively. Currently, she is the Head Research Investigator for the Swiss Programme for Research and Global Issues for Development.

== Research and academic work ==
Abena Frempongmaa Daagye Oduro's work cuts across a variety of topics namely trade policy, asset management and ownership, poverty and gender analysis, labour market in low-income countries and inequality and vulnerability analysis. Aside these areas of specialization, some of her work is also centred around World Trade Organization (WTO) issues and the economics of education. Her work has been published on platforms such as World Development and African Development Review and SSRN.

== Selected scholarship ==
=== "Ownership of the Place of Residence in Ghana: A Gender Analysis" (2015) ===
Gender analysis and asset management and control are one of the recurring themes that are present in a lot of Abena Oduro's work. Using economic tools such as regression analysis, she explores the disparity in home ownership between men and women in Ghana. In doing so, she also delves into issues relating to rights such as the right to sell or freedom to use ones property through a critical feminist theory lens. Abena Oduro, in this paper, explores the effect certain aspects of Ghanaian culture has on the level of control a woman has in exercising her rights to sell or to use her home as collateral. She concludes by highlighting the need to explore this trend on a more microlevel; in terms of ethnic groups.

=== "Ethnicity and Wage Determination in Ghana" (2000) ===
In this paper, Oduro and Abigail Barr explore the relationship between a worker's ethnic group and their earnings. They also investigate any forms of pay discrimination by virtue of relations between the worker and the employer, ethnic group and their work experience. This research is part of the World Bank's Policy Research under "The Economics of Ethnicity and Entrepreneurship in Africa." Their findings saw that there were pay differentials by ethnic group- the Northerners were typically earning less mainly because of the average level of education people from that part of Ghana have in a lifetime thereby reducing their earning power and employment mobility. Their paper also showed that relatives of employers were also paid more and there is a preference of inexperienced workers from the same ethnic group than other ethnic groups.

=== "Gendered Paths to Asset Accumulation: Markets, Savings and Credit in Developing Countries" (2019) ===
This paper, written by Carmen Diana Deere, Abena Oduro, Hema Swaminathan, Zachary Catanzarite and J.Y. Suchitra, was published in the Feminist Economics journal and explores the gender disparity in asset ownership and accumulation. Funding and owning assets such as houses, land, real estates, businesses and agriculture have shown to be more difficult for women than it is for men in the case study countries which are Ecuador, Ghana and Karnataka, India. Abena Oduro provides her research findings within the Ghanaian context which share the same aforementioned trend and problems. The paper suggests that, in order to bridge this gap in capital and land accumulation, there is a need to promote financial inclusion which focuses on both savings and credits.

=== "Closing the Gender Gaps in Ghana" (2017) ===
Abena Oduro and Charles Ackah explore gender gaps in asset accumulation, education and employment through a historical sense. They propose that although there have been policy changes to address this issue, they have not been effective enough to cause a dramatic change especially in educational levels of women in Ghana. With respect to wages, there is a fairly large gender wage gap especially when taking into account domestic work of women. Oduro and Ackah propose the need to have stronger policies centred around changing values and certain cultural norms to address this problem and reduce this gender gap.

== Notable conferences and seminars ==
Oduro has held talks at the International Association for Feminist Economics on:

- Teaching African women in the development context: Home ownership in Ghana
- The Primacy of Gender in Education: Gender analysis of delayed enrollment in Ghana: Universal primary education
- Gender in Post conflict and post-shock contexts: Intra-household analysis of shocks and coping strategies: Ghana and India context
- Savings and Control over resources: Women who save comparative analysis of Ecuador, Ghana and India
- International Trade and Migration: Gender, remittances and asset accumulation in Ecuador and Ghana

Oduro has also held seminars at the Global Studies Programme (GSP), where she spoke on:

- "The Gender Gap in Asset Ownership in Ghana"

Oduro presented at a World Bank conference on the topic:

- "The World Bank in Ghana", with E. Aryeetey (1996)
- "A Note on the Nature and Structure of Poverty" (1999)
- "The WTO and Agriculture: A Ghana Case Study" (2002)

== Publications ==
=== Books ===
- Oduro, Abena D.; Akyeampong, Kwame; Djangmah, Jerome; Seidu, Alhassan; Hunt, Frances (2007). Access to basic education in Ghana: the evidence and the issues: country analytic report. Brighton: CREATE, Centre for International Education, University of Sussex. ISBN 9780901881120.
- Oduro, Abena D.; Baah-Boateng, William; Boakye-Yiadom, Louis (2011). Measuring the gender asset gap in Ghana. Accra: Woeli Publishing Services, published for the Department of Economics, University of Ghana. ISBN 9789988851064.
- Oduro, Abena D.; Agyei-Mensah, Samuel; Ayee, Joseph R.A., eds. (2014). Changing perspectives on the social sciences in Ghana. Dordrecht: Springer. ISBN 9789401787147.

=== Papers ===
- Oduro, Abena D.; Tsikata, G.K.; Jebuni, Charles D.; Asante, Yaw (1992). Diversifying exports: the supply response of non-traditional exports to Ghana's economic recovery programme (PDF). London Legon: University of Ghana and the Overseas Development Institute (ODI). ISBN 9780850031898. Archived from the original (PDF) on 23 August 2014.
- Oduro, Abena D.; Baah-Nuakoh, Amoah; Jebuni, Charles D.; Asante, Yaw (1996). Exporting manufactures from Ghana: is adjustment enough? (PDF). Ghana London: University of Ghana and the Overseas Development Institute (ODI). ISBN 9780850032413. Archived from the original (PDF) on 23 August 2014.
- Oduro, Abena D.; Osei-Akoto, Isaac; Acquaye, I. (2004). Poverty in a globalising economy: the role of rural institutions, Ghana. Japan.

Report Presented to Foundation for Advanced Studies on International Development (FASID) and the African Economic Research Consortium (AERC) as part of the Africa-Asia Research & Capacity Building Network for African Development Project, AERC Nairobi.

- Oduro, Abena D. (2010). Women in economic research graduate training in West Africa. Nairobi: African Economic Research Consortium (AERC). ISBN 9789966778550. Archived from the original on 15 August 2020. Special Paper No. 46
- Oduro, Abena D.; Doss, Cheryl; Deere, Carmen Diana; Suchitra, J.Y.; Hillesland, Marya (2011). Lessons from the field: implementing individual asset surveys in Ecuador, Ghana, India and Uganda. Bangalore: Indian Institute of Management Bangalore.

=== Chapters in books ===
- Oduro, Abena D.; Aryeetey, Ernest (1997), "Regional integration efforts in Africa: an overview", in Teunissen, Jan Joost (ed.), Regionalism and the global economy: the case of Central and Eastern Europe, The Hague: FONDAD, ISBN 9789074208116.
- Oduro, Abena D.; Jebuni, Charles D. (1998), "Structural adjustment programme and the transition to democracy", in Ninsin, Kwame Akon (ed.), Ghana: transition to democracy, Dakar, Senegal: Codesria, ISBN 9782869780910, archived from the original on 2 March 2022.
- Oduro, Abena D.; Harrigan, Jane (2000), "Exchange rate policy and the balance of payments 1972–1996", in Aryeetey, Ernest; Harrigan, Jane; Nissanke, Machiko (eds.), Economic reforms in Ghana: the myth and the mirage, Trenton, New Jersey: Africa World Press, ISBN 9780865438446.
- Oduro, Abena D. (2003), "Agriculture and the new trade agenda in the WTO 2000 negotiations: economic analyses of interests and options for Ghana", in Ingco, Merlinda D.; Nash, John D.; Njinkeu, Dominique (eds.), Liberalizing agricultural trade: issues and options for Sub-Saharan Africa in the WTO (PDF), Lagos: Macmillan Nigeria, pp. 229–263, ISBN 9789780183530.
- Oduro, Abena D.; Appiah-Kubi, A.; Senadza, B. (2008), "Understanding poverty in Ghana: risk and vulnerability", in Kanbur, Ravi; Aryeetey, Ernest (eds.), The economy of Ghana: analytical perspectives on stability, growth & poverty, Oxford Accra, Ghana: James Currey and Woeli Publishing Services, ISBN 9781847010032.
- Oduro, Abena D. (2009), "African Countries and the green box", in Melňdez-Ortiz, Ricardo; Bellmann, Christophe; Hepburn, Jonathan, eds. (3 December 2009). Agricultural subsidies in the WTO green box: ensuring coherence with sustainable development goals. Cambridge, UK New York: Cambridge University Press. pp. 412–424. ISBN 9780521519694.
- Oduro, Abena D.; Aryeetey, Ernest; Osei-Akoto, Isaac; Osei, Robert Darko (2010), "An investigation into the gender dimensions of taxation in Ghana", in Grown, Caren; Valodia, Imraan, eds. (January 2010). Taxation and gender equity: a comparative analysis of direct and indirect taxes in developing and developed countries. London New York Ottawa: Routledge International Development Research Centre. pp. 151–178. ISBN 9781552504697.
- Oduro, Abena D.; Boakye-Yiadom, Louis; Baah-Boateng, William (2014), "Asset ownership among rural and urban women in Ghana", in Twerefou, Daniel Kwabena; Quartey, Peter; Boakye-Yiadom, Louis; Baah-Boateng, William (eds.), Readings on key economic issues in Ghana, Tema, Ghana: for the University of Ghana by Digibooks Ghana Ltd, pp. 76–97, ISBN 9789988191542.
- Oduro, Abena D.; Offei, Emmanuel Larbi (2014), "The incidence of intra-industry trade between Ghana and its Ecowas trading partners", in Twerefou, Daniel Kwabena; Quartey, Peter; Boakye-Yiadom, Louis; Baah-Boateng, William (eds.), Readings on key economic issues in Ghana, Tema, Ghana: for the University of Ghana by Digibooks Ghana Ltd, pp. 236–255, ISBN 9789988191542.
- Oduro, Abena D.; Nabalamba, Alice (2015), "Gender", in Ncube, Mthuli; Lufumpa, Leyeka (eds.), The emerging middle class in Africa, London: New York Routledge, Taylor & Francis Group, pp. 149–169, ISBN 9781315757896.

=== Journal articles ===
- Oduro, Abena D.; Jebuni, Charles D.; Tutu, K.A. (August 1994). "Trade and payments regime and the balance of payments in Ghana". World Development. 22 (8): 1161–1173. doi:10.1016/0305-750X(94)90083-3.
- Oduro, Abena D.; Deere, Carmen Diana; Swaminathan, Hema; Doss, Cheryl (June 2013). "Property rights and the gender distribution of wealth in Ecuador, Ghana and India". The Journal of Economic Inequality. 11 (2): 249–265. doi:10.1007/s10888-013-9241-z. S2CID 153897813.
- Oduro, Abena D.; Boakye-Yiadom, Louis (June 2014). "Gender, migrant remittances and asset acquisition in Ghana". Ghana Social Science Journal. 11 (1): 1–25.
- Oduro, Abena D.; van Staveren, Irene (2015). "Engendering economic policy in Africa". Feminist Economics. 21 (3): 1–22. doi:10.1080/13545701.2015.1059467. hdl:1765/79328. S2CID 153361566.
- Oduro, Abena D.; Seshie-Nasser, Hellen A. (July 2016). "Delayed primary school enrolment among boys and girls in Ghana". International Journal of Educational Development. 49: 107–114. doi:10.1016/j.ijedudev.2015.12.004.

Non-profit organisation positions
| Preceded by Radhika Balakrishnan | President Elect of the International Association for Feminist Economics; 2021–2022 | Vacant Title next held by the IAFFE'S elected candidate |
