= Drucilla K. Barker =

American feminist economist (1949 2023)

- Born: March 12, 1949; Akron, Ohio, U.S.
- Died: January 12, 2023 (aged 73); Columbia, South Carolina, U.S.
- Other name: Drue Barker
- Citizenship: United States
- Occupations: Professor of Anthropology & Women's and Gender Studies
- Known for: Feminist Economy
- Children: 1

Academic background
- Education: PhD, University of Illinois (1988)

Academic work
- Discipline: Economics
- Sub-discipline: Feminist Economics
- Institutions: University of South Carolina
- Notable works: Liberating Economics: Feminist Perspectives on Families, Work, and Globalization

Drucilla K. Barker (March 12, 1949 – January 12, 2023) was an American feminist economist and scholar of labor. At the time of her death, Barker was Professor of Anthropology in the Department of Anthropology and the Women's and Gender Studies Program at the University of South Carolina. Barker described herself as a "Marxist feminist economist whose research interests are globalization, feminist political economy, and economic anthropology".

== Early life ==
Drucilla K. Barker was born in Akron, Ohio on March 12, 1949. Barker's father died during the Korean War, when she was a little over one year old. Her mother remarried shortly thereafter and the family moved to Norfolk, Virginia. Her mother's interest in acting would take her family to California, where they lived during the 1950s and 1960s.

Her mother and step-father would divorce, which resulted in her mother going back to school to obtain a Masters in Psychology and then enter into the PhD program in Psychology at the University of Southern California. Barker's mother died when she was 18. She credits her mother obtaining the ABD but not living to get the PhD as an inspiration for her to go into higher education.

Being orphaned at the age of 18, Barker would spend several years as part of the counter-culture movement and lived as a hippie in New Mexico and Northern California.

=== Educational career ===
Barker entered school in the late 1970s when she decided to go to Sonoma State University. She graduated with a degree in economics after initially enrolling in philosophy. She would then go on receive a Master in Economics from Illinois State and her PhD in Economics at the University of Illinois at Champaign-Urbana.

== Academic career ==
=== Early years ===
Before graduating, Barker accepted a position as an Assistant Professor of Economics at Hollins University. She received tenure in 1992. Barker would remain at Hollins until the end of the 2005-2006 academic year. While at Hollins University, Barker served as one of the founding members of the then Women's Studies Collective. She would go on to serve as the Director of Women's Studies at Hollins University for over a decade. She left Hollins as a Professor of Economics and Women's and Gender Studies.

While at Hollins, Barker was one of the founding members of the International Association of Feminist Economics.

=== University of South Carolina ===
At the start of the 2006–2007 academic year, Barker was named the Director of the Women's Studies Program at the University of South Carolina. She was the third overall director of the program and the first Director not internal to the University system. Barker would oversee the name and focus change for the program to the Women's and Gender Studies program. She would expand community engagement, increase the number of cross-appointed faculty, and increase course offerings – going from a undergraduate minor and graduate certificate to an undergraduate major, undergraduate minor, and graduate certificate.

At the University of South Carolina, Barker was appointed as a Professor of Anthropology and Women's and Gender Studies. Although an Economist by training, she was tenured in the College of Arts and Sciences.

Barker served as the Director of Women's and Gender Studies until 2014, when she stepped down and returned to the faculty for health reasons. She remained a tenured faculty.

== Contributions to science ==
Barker was a second-wave feminist. She was one of the first-wave of feminist economist. She is wildly recognized as one of the founders of the field of feminist economist. She contributed heavily to the merger of feminism, gender studies, and economics as an area of inquiry - paving the way for future generations of scholars. She was regularly sought after for comments on the state of women in South Carolina.

She is particularly known for her contributions and recognition as caregiving and women's work as a form of capital and labor through an intersectional lens. She also contributed a Marxist perspective to political labor and capital.

Her work is often cited in scholarship of labor and work. The University of Washington named their labor series the Drucilla K. Marker Memorial Series in recognition of her contributions to the field.

She was the author or editor of more than 10 books and 22 book chapters or articles.

== Notable works ==
- Barker, D. (2003). Toward a Feminist Philosophy of Economics. United Kingdom: Routledge.
- Bergeron, S., Feiner, S. F., Barker, D. (2021). Liberating Economics, Second Edition: Feminist Perspectives on Families, Work, and Globalization. United States: University of Michigan Press.
- Barker, D., Feiner, S. F. (2009). Liberating Economics: Feminist Perspectives on Families, Work, and Globalization. Ukraine: University of Michigan Press.
