= Radhika Balakrishnan =

American academic and activist

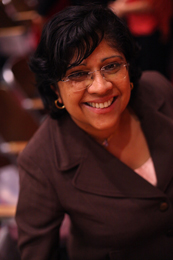
A photograph of Radhika Balakrishnan, courtesy of the Center for Women's Global Leadership.

Radhika Balakrishnan (born in Ootacamund, India) is the faculty director of the Center for Women's Global Leadership at Rutgers University. Currently, she serves as the Chair of the Board of the United States Human Rights Network and Chair on the Board of the Center for Constitutional Rights, Commissioner for the Commission for Gender Equity for the City of New York, and President of the International Association for Feminist Economics (IAFFE) for 2020–2021.

== Biography ==
Radhika Balakrishnan grew up in Tamil Nadu, India and moved to Chicago, Illinois at the age of 13. She attended the University of Illinois at Urbana–Champaign initially to study engineering, but switched majors and graduated in 1980 with a Bachelor of Arts in Economics. It was at the University of Illinois that she first became involved in the women's movement, which inspired her to study economics. In 1985 she received her Master of Arts in Economics, and in 1990 she received her Ph.D. in Economics, both from Rutgers University.

== Career ==
From 1992 to 1995, Radhika Balakrishnan worked at the Ford Foundation as a program officer in the Asian Regional Program. From 2003 to 2009, she was a professor at Marymount Manhattan College where she taught economics and international studies. In September 2009, she joined Rutgers University as a professor of Women's and Gender Studies and the executive director of the Center for Women's Global Leadership, where she focused on issues of economics and social justice from a feminist perspective as they relate to macroeconomic policy, especially in health and education. Balakrishnan now serves as the faculty director of the center.

== Interviews ==
- "More Women Peacekeepers Is Not the Solution" Cléo Fatoorehchi interviews RADHIKA BALAKRISHNAN of the Centre for Women's Global Leadership. Inter Press Service, December 2010.
- 16 Days of Activism: Spotlight on Militarism. Global Fund for Women, November 2010.
- Interview with Radika Balakrishnan on Huffington Post Article Why Human Rights are Indispensable to Financial Regulation. Law and Order Radio, Pacific Radio, April 2010.
- NGLS Interviews Radhika Balakrishnan, Executive Director, Center for Women’s Global Leadership. UN Non-Governmental Liaison Service (UN NGLS), January 2010.
- Experts Comment on Rights in Times of Economic Crisis. Center for Economic and Social Rights, November 2009.

== Research and publications ==
Balakrishnan's primary research interests are gender and development, human rights and the global economy, and human rights and economic social rights.

Her publications include:

=== Books ===
- Balakrishnan, Radhika (2005). Why MES with human rights?: Integrating macro economic strategies with human rights. New York: Marymount Manhattan College. OCLC 821054967.
- Balakrishnan, Radhika, ed. (2002). The hidden assembly line: gender dynamics of subcontracted work in a global economy. Bloomfield, Connecticut: Kumarian Press. ISBN 9781565491403.
- Balakrishnan, Radhika; Jung, Patricia; Hunt, Mary, eds. (2001). Good sex: feminist perspectives from the world's religions. New Brunswick, New Jersey: Rutgers University Press. ISBN 9780813528847.

=== Recent articles and book chapters ===
- Balakrishnan, Radhika; Heintz, James (July 2010). "Corporate control of our democracy: Citizens United v. Federal Election Commission". The Huffington Post.
- Balakrishnan, Radhika; Heintz, James (April 2010). "Making the International Monetary Fund accountable to human rights". The Huffington Post.
- Balakrishnan, Radhika; Elson, Diane; Patel, Raj (March 2010). "Rethinking macro economic strategies from a human rights perspective". Development. 53 (1): 27–36. doi:10.1057/dev.2009.83. S2CID 86077721.
- Balakrishnan, Radhika; Heintz, James (March 2010). "Why human rights are indispensable to financial regulation". The Huffington Post.
- Balakrishnan, Radhika; Elson, Diane (July 2008). "Auditing economic policy in the light of obligations on economic and social rights" (PDF). Essex Human Rights Review. 5 (1).
- Balakrishnan, Radhika (January 2007). "Exploring collaborations: heterodox economics and economic social rights framework". Feminist Economics. 13 (1): 87–116. doi:10.1080/13545700601086838. S2CID 153719183.
- Balakrishnan, Radhika; Sayeed, Asad (2004), "Why do firms disintegrate? Towards an understanding of the firm-level decision to subcontract and its implication for labor", in Milberg, William, ed. (2004). Labor and the globalization of production: causes and consequences of industrial upgrading. Houndmills New York, N.Y: Palgrave Macmillan. pp. 104–118. ISBN 9781403935021.

Non-profit organisation positions
Preceded by Cheryl Doss	President of the International Association for Feminist Economics; 2020–2021	Succeeded by Abena Oduro
