= Nilufer Cagatay =

Turkish-born professor of Economics

Nilüfer Çağatay (1955 – 23 December 2022) was a Turkish born professor of economics at the University of Utah (1991–2021). She was a pioneer in adding a gender-awareness to the study of the macroeconomy and the development of a feminist macroeconomics.

== Early life and education ==
Çağatay was born in Turkey in 1955. She earned a BA in economics and political science at Yale University and gained a MA and Ph.D. in economics from Stanford University.

== Career ==
Çağatay worked in the Department of Economics at the University of Utah between 1991 and 2021. From 1997 to 2000, Çağatay took a leave of absence from the University of Utah to work as an Economic Advisor in the Social Development and Poverty Elimination Division of the United Nations Development Programme in New York. Çağatay was regarded as a pioneer in adding a gender-awareness to the study of the macroeconomy and the development of a feminist macroeconomics. Together with Diane Elson and Caren Grown, she founded an international network, the International Working Group on Gender, Macroeconomics, and International Economics (GEM-IWG), which was formed "for the purpose of promoting gender-equitable approaches to macroeconomics, international economics, and globalization". The network holds summer schools at the Levy Institute, and has regional networks that hold local schools internationally.

== Later life and death ==
Çağatay retired from the University of Utah Department of Economics in 2021 and moved back to her home city of Istanbul. She died in on 23 December 2022. In October 2023, the University of Utah held a memorial conference dedicated to her research impact.

== Selected publications ==
- Çağatay, N., & Özler, Ş. (1995). Feminization of the labor force: The effects of long-term development and structural adjustment. World development, 23(11), 1883–1894.
- Cagatay, N. (1998). Gender and poverty. New York: UNDP, Social Development and Poverty Elimination Division.
- Çagatay, N. (2001). Trade, gender and poverty. New York: UNDP.
- Elson, D., & Cagatay, N. (2000). The social content of macroeconomic policies. World Development, 28(7), 1347–1364.
