= Michèle Pujol =

French feminist economist (1951–1997)

Dr. Michèle A. Pujol
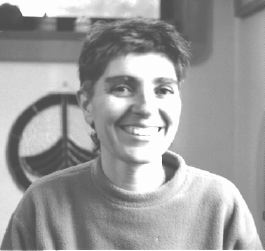
- Born: 20 April 1951; Madaoua, Niger
- Died: 2 August 1997 (aged 46); Salt Spring Island, Canada

Philosophical work
- Era: 19th and 20th century economics
- Region: Western philosophy
- School: Feminism, political economy, feminist economics, social justice
- Institutions: University of Victoria, Canada
- Main interests: Epistemology, political economy, ethics, feminist economics
- Notable ideas: John Stuart Mill, Harriet Taylor Mill, feminist economists, feminist economics

Michèle Pujol (French pronunciation: [miʃɛl]) (20 April 1951 – 2 August 1997), was a French feminist, economist, scholar, and human rights activist. She was an assistant professor at the University of Victoria's Department of Women's Studies and held a chair at the University of Manitoba.

Pujol wrote essays and histories about socioeconomic issues affecting women, as well as a bibliography in several volumes on women's contributions to economics. She was known for teaching and writing critical studies of economics, as well as for her book Feminism and Anti-Feminism in Early Economic Thought. In the 1980s and 1990s, Pujol was associated with lesbian feminism.

== Biography ==
=== Early life ===
Pujol was born in Madaoua, Niger. She was the daughter of a French colonial administrator in Niger and a home economist. She went to college in Paris, where she studied mathematics, and went on to get a bachelor's degree in economics.

She arrived in Paris from French Polynesia during May 68. Her earliest thinking was formed in the collective action of students and workers as well as the sexual and intellectual liberation movement happening in France at that time.

She graduated from HEC Jeunes Filles in 1973.

Drawn to the radicalism of the west coast, she travelled to the United States to complete her master's degree at Washington State University. Her doctorate in economics was from Simon Fraser University in Vancouver, Canada. Pujol became a professor of Women's Studies at the University of Manitoba in 1981 and then as associate professor at the University of Victoria, where she worked from 1990 until her death.

=== Academic life ===
Pujol's scholarship documented the role of women in economics. Her doctoral dissertation at Simon Fraser University formed the basis of her book, Feminism and Anti-Feminism in Early Economic Thought. She investigated women's economic roles in what she termed the "malestream" of British classical political economy and early neoclassical economics.

Writing on the "feminist economic thought of Harriet Taylor (1807–58)" in 1995, Pujol established the "materialist analysis that distinguishes Taylor from Mill's idealist and male-centred position." Pujol also extended the canon of past economic thought, reviving feminist analytical contributions on economic inequality by Taylor, Barbara Leigh Smith Bodichon, Millicent Garrett Fawcett, Eleanor Rathbone, and William Smart.

In addition to pioneering the feminist history of economics, Pujol was active in contemporary feminist economics, with particular attention to broadening research methodology. She was engaged in a study of the implementation of pay equity policies in Canada. An associate editor of Feminist Economics, from its foundation, Pujol, together with Nancy Folbre, edited an "Explorations," section in the Fall 1996 issue on feminist issues in national accounting and on research priorities in nonmarket production. Pujol was a founding member of the International Association for Feminist Economics She completed a book about pay equity in Canada for the University of Manitoba. Pujol also completed a bibliography of 19th-century writings by women economists, published in English posthumously.

=== Personal life ===
While teaching in Manitoba (1981–1988), she was active in the Winnipeg Gay and Lesbian Society, the Manitoba Action Committee on the Status of Women, and the Winnipeg Native Family Economic Development group. She was coordinator of Women's Studies at the University of Manitoba from 1984 to 1988. During her years in Winnipeg, Pujol helped organize the first three Gay Pride Day marches and two Canadian Women's Music festivals. At the University of Victoria, she assisted women student activists with their work at the campus Women's Centre. Pujol was the first instructor to develop a lesbian studies course. Her students and friends organized the first annual Lesbian Walk in response to homophobia experienced by Pujol and the Women's Studies Department at the University of Victoria.

=== Death ===
Pujol was diagnosed with colon cancer in the spring of 1997, and had surgery in early April, during which liver metastasis was discovered. Pujol died on 2 August 1997, at home beside her partner, Brook Holdack, five months after her diagnosis. Atlantis: A Women's Studies Journal, published a special issue, "Sexual Economics," in 1999, on feminist economic perspectives, to celebrate the life and work of Pujol. The issue was edited by her colleague, Marjorie Griffin Cohen, at the Department of Women's Studies of Simon Fraser University.

== Published works ==
=== Books ===
- Pujol, Michèle A. (1992). Feminism and anti-feminism in early economic thought. Edward Elgar Publishing. ISBN 9781858988849.

=== Book chapters ===
- Pujol, Michèle (1995), "Into the margin!", in Feiner, Susan; Kuiper, Edith; Sap, Jolande; Ott, Notburga; Tzannatos, Zafiris (eds.), Out of the margin feminist perspectives on economics, London New York: Routledge, pp. 17–34, ISBN 9780415125758.
- Pujol, Michèle (1995), "The feminist economic thought of Harriet Taylor (1807–58)", in Dimand, Mary Ann; Dimand, Robert W.; Forget, Evelyn L. (eds.), Women of value: feminist essays on the history of women in economics, Aldershot, Hants, UK Brookfield, Vermont, US: Edward Elgar, ISBN 9781852789596
- Pujol, Michèle (1995), "Gender and class in Marshall's Principles of Economics", in Humphries, Jane (ed.), Gender and economics, Aldershot, England Brookfield, Vermont, USA: Edward Elgar, pp. 59–76, ISBN 9781852788438.

=== Journals and journal articles ===
- Pujol, Michèle; McCannell, K. (1988). "Some factors affecting the career patterns of women faculty at the University of Manitoba". University of Manitoba Faculty Association; Status of Women Committee; Canadian Women's Studies Association, Canadian Sociology and Anthropology Association.
- Pujol, Michèle (September 1984). "Gender and class in Marshall's Principles of Economics". Cambridge Journal of Economics. 8 (3): 217–234. doi:10.1093/oxfordjournals.cje.a035547.
- Pujol, Michèle; Folbre, Nancy (November 1996). "Introduction". Feminist Economics. 2 (3): 121. doi:10.1080/13545709610001707796.
- Pujol, Michèle; et al. (November 1996). "Forum: research priorities on nonmarket production". Feminist Economics. 2 (3): 135. doi:10.1080/13545709610001707836.
- Pujol, Michèle (January 1997). "Introduction: broadening economic data and methods". Feminist Economics. 3 (2): 119–120. doi:10.1080/135457097338726.
- Griffin Cohen, Marjorie; et al. (January 1997). "Special issue: Sexual Economics - to celebrate the life and work of Michèle Pujol". Atlantis: A Women's Studies Journal. 23 (2).

=== Lectures ===
Pujol participated in the History of Economics Society's annual meeting at the University of British Columbia in June 1996 with a presentation on her multi-volume anthology of women's contributions to political economy before 1900, which she was editing for publication by Routledge and Thoemmes Continuum.

A contributor to Out of the Margin: Feminist Perspectives on Economic Theory, Pujol presented her chapter work at the 1996 International Association for Feminist Economics (IAFFE) conference in Washington, D.C.

In 1995, Pujol presented "Is This Really Economics? Using Qualitative Research Methods in Feminist Economic Research," to the International Association for Feminist Economics (IAFFE) conference in Tours, France.

== General references ==
- St. Peter, Christine (1997). "In memorium: Michele Pujol" The Ring (University of Victoria), p.6.
- Verardi, Donna (1992). Personal notes and conversations with Dr. Michèle A. Pujol. (Beguine Foundation, Canada).
- Feminist Economics, Volume 3, Issue 3 (1997).
