= Diane Elson =

British sociologist

- Born: Diane Rosemary Elson; 20 April 1946 (age 80); Bedworth, Warwickshire, England
- Education: University of Manchester
- Occupations: Professor of development studies at the University of Manchester; Professor of sociology at the University of Essex
- Years active: 1968–present
- Children: 1

Diane Rosemary Elson (born 20 April 1946) in an English economist, sociologist and gender and development social scientist. She is professor emerita of sociology at the University of Essex and a former professor of development studies at the University of Manchester.

She is noted for her work on issues of development and human rights. A theme in her more recent work is gender inequality and economic and social rights. She is the author of the books Male Bias in the Development Process, and Budgeting for Women's Rights: Monitoring Government Budgets for Compliance with CEDAW (Concepts and Tools), and of many other publications and articles.

She has also worked as a special advisor for UNIFEM and is the chair of the UK's Women's Budget Group. She was a winner of the Leontief Prize for Advancing the Frontiers of Economic Thought for 2016, along with Amit Bhaduri.

== Biography ==
Elson was born on 20 April 1946 in Bedworth, Warwickshire, England, the daughter of Edwin and Vera Elson.

In 1968, she gained a degree in philosophy, politics and economics (PPE) from St Hilda's College, Oxford University, and her doctorate in economics from the University of Manchester in 1994.

Elson has a son.

== Career ==
- 1968 – 1971 Research Assistant, Institute of Commonwealth Studies and St Antony's College, Oxford
- 1971 – 1975 Teaching fellow, Department of Economics, University of York
- 1975 – 1977 Research officer, Institute of Development Studies, University of Sussex
- 1978 – 1979 Temporary lecturer, University of Manchester
- 1979 – 1984 Part-time consultant and occasional lecturer, University of Manchester
- 1984 – 1985 Honorary resident fellow, International Development Centre and Department of Sociology, University of Manchester
- 1985 – 1991 Lecturer, University of Manchester
- 1992 – 1995 Reader, Development Economics, University of Manchester
- 1995 – 1998 Professor of development studies, University of Manchester
- 1998 – 2000 Special advisor, United Nations Development Fund for Women (UNIFEM)
- 1998 – 2000 Member, United Nations Taskforce on Millennium Development Goals
- 2000 – 2012 Professor of Sociology, University of Essex, now emeritus
- 2008 – 2010 Strategic Res. Bd. Economic and Social Research Council (ESRC)
- 2012 onwards Advisor, United Nations Entity for Gender Equality and the Empowerment of Women (UN Women)

== Selected publications ==
=== Books ===
- Elson, Diane; Streeten, Paul (1971). Diversification and development: the case of coffee. New York London: Praeger (Pall Mall Press). ISBN 9780275281915.
- Elson, Diane, ed. (1979). Value: the representation of labour in capitalism. London: CSE Books. ISBN 9780906336076.
- Elson, Diane; Pearson, Ruth (1989). Women's employment and multinationals in Europe. Basingstoke England: Macmillan. ISBN 9780333438770.
- Elson, Diane (1995). Male bias in the development process (contemporary issues in development studies). Manchester New York New York: Manchester University Press (USA and Canada – St. Martin's Press). ISBN 9780719042300.
- Elson, Diane; Balakrishnan, Radhika (2011). Economic policy and human rights: holding governments to account. London New York: Zed Books, Palgrave Macmillan. ISBN 9781848138759.
- Elson, Diane; Jain, Devaki (2011). Harvesting feminist knowledge for public policy rebuilding progress. New Delhi Thousand Oaks, Calif. Ottawa, ON: SAGE International Development Research Centre. ISBN 9788132107415.
- Elson, Diane; Fukuda-Parr, Sakiko; Vizard, Polly (2012). Human rights and the capabilities approach: an interdisciplinary dialogue. Milton Park, Abingdon, Oxon New York: Routledge. ISBN 9780415681032.
- Elson, Diane, ed. (2015). Value: the representation of labour in capitalism. London, England: Verso Press. ISBN 9781784782290.

=== Chapters in books ===
- Elson, Diane (2004), "Human rights and corporate profits: the UN global compact – part of the solution or part of the problem?", in Benería, Lourdes; Bisnath, Savitri (eds.), Global tensions: challenges and opportunities in the world economy, New York: Routledge, pp. 200–214, ISBN 9780415934411
- Elson, Diane; Balakrishnan, Radhika (2011), "Introduction: economic policies and human rights obligations", in Elson, Diane; Balakrishnan, Radhika (eds.), Economic policy and human rights: holding governments to account, London New York: Zed Books, Palgrave Macmillan, pp. 1–27, ISBN 9781848138759
- Elson, Diane; Aydiner-Avsar, Nursel (2011), "Human rights and public expenditure in Mexico", in Elson, Diane; Balakrishnan, Radhika (eds.), Economic policy and human rights: holding governments to account, London New York: Zed Books, Palgrave Macmillan, pp. 73–98, ISBN 9781848138759
- Elson, Diane; Aydiner-Avsar, Nursel (2011), "Trade policy and human rights obligations of the USA: NAFTA", in Elson, Diane; Balakrishnan, Radhika (eds.), Economic policy and human rights: holding governments to account, London New York: Zed Books, Palgrave Macmillan, pp. 119–221, ISBN 9781848138759
- Elson, Diane (2015), "Women's empowerment and environmental sustainability in the context of international UN agreements", in Hawley, Jenny (ed.), Why women will save the planet, London: Zed Books, pp. 11–20, ISBN 9781783605804

=== Journals and booklets ===
- Elson, Diane; Pearson, Ruth (1980). The latest phase of the internationalisation of capital and its implications for women in the third world (discussion paper). Institute of Development Studies at the University of Sussex.
- Elson, Diane (1984). Women's work – women's lives. Third World First.
- Elson, Diane (November–December 1988). "Market socialism or socialization of the market?". New Left Review. 172 (The economy of socialism).
- Elson, Diane (2006). Budgeting for women's rights: monitoring government budgets for compliance with CEDAW (a summary guide for policy makers, gender equality and human rights advocates). UN Women Headquarters: UNIFEM (UN Women). Pdf version
- Elson, Diane; Balakrishnan, Radhika (July 2008). "Auditing economic policy in the light of obligations on economic and social rights" (PDF). Essex Human Rights Review. 5 (1).
- Elson, Diane; Balakrishnan, Radhika; Patel, Raj (March 2010). "Rethinking macro economic strategies from a human rights perspective". Development. 53 (1): 27–36. doi:10.1057/dev.2009.83. S2CID 86077721.
- Elson, Diane (2012). Be outraged: there are alternatives. Oxfam. Pdf version
- Elson, Diane (2015). Value: the representation of labour in capitalism. London: Verso. ISBN 9781784782313.

== See also ==
- Feminist economics
- List of feminist economists
