= African Development Review =

- Discipline: Africa / Tanzania / social sciences / politics / economic development
- Language: English

Publication details
- Publisher: Oxford : Blackwell (United Kingdom)

Standard abbreviations
- ISO 4: Afr. Dev. Rev.

Indexing
- ISSN: 1467-8268
- OCLC no.: 237388943

Links
- Journal homepage

The African Development Review is devoted to the study and analysis of development policy in Africa. Published four times a year for the African Development Bank, the Review emphasizes policy relevance of research findings, rather than purely theoretical and quantitative issues.

According to the Journal Citation Reports, the journal has a 2021 impact factor of 2.766.
