= Henri Pujol =

French oncologist

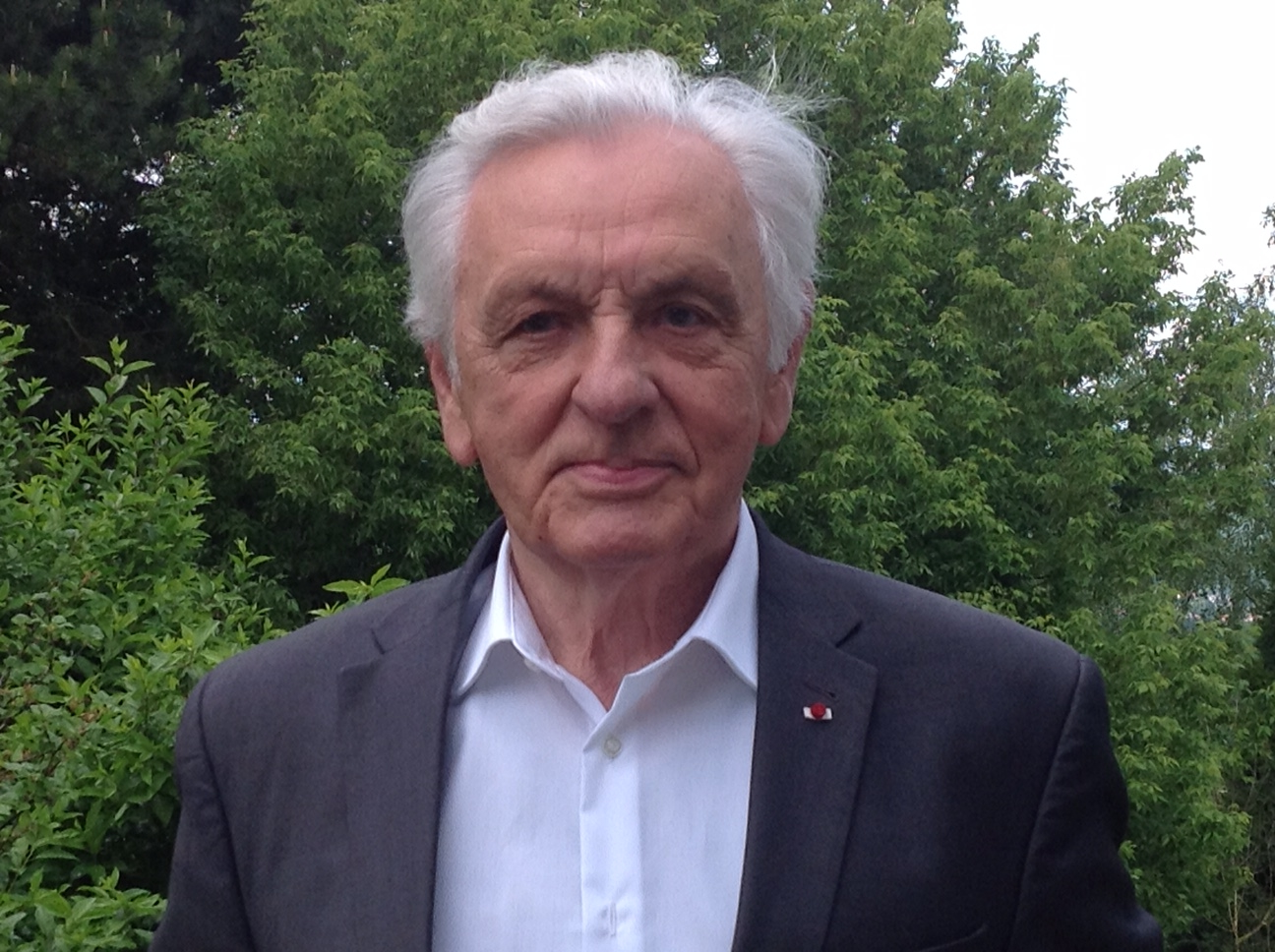
Henri Pujol

Henri Pujol is a French professor at University of Montpellier 1 and former president of the French ligue against cancer from 1998 to 2007.

== Bibliography ==
- L'Assiette Vitalité
