= Puyol =

Puyol is a Catalan surname and a variant of Pujol, meaning "hill". Notable people with the surname include:

- Carles Puyol (born 1978), retired Spanish footballer
- Pablo Puyol (born 1975), Spanish actor, dancer and singer

== See also ==
- Pujol (disambiguation)
