= Sabine O'Hara =

- O'Hara in 2018
- Years active: 1990s–present
- Organization: International Society for Ecological Economics

Academic background
- Education: University of Göttingen
- Influences: Sustainability, Environmental justice

Academic work
- Discipline: Ecological economics, sustainable development, urban agriculture
- Institutions: University of the District of Columbia
- Notable ideas: Restorative economics; Urban Food Hubs model
- Awards: Gourmand World Cookbook Awards (2025)
- Website: www.udc.edu

Sabine O'Hara is a German-born agricultural and ecological economist and scholar. Her work focuses on sustainable development, urban food systems, circular economies, and environmental justice. She is a distinguished professor at the College of Agriculture, Urban Sustainability and Environmental Sciences (CAUSES) at the University of the District of Columbia. She is a former president of the International Society for Ecological Economics and Roanoke College.

== Education and career ==
O'Hara earned degrees in Agricultural Science, Agricultural Economics, and Environmental Economics (Dr. sc. ag.) from the Universität Göttingen in Germany. She holds additional certificates in higher education leadership from Yale University and the Harvard University Graduate School of Education.

During her tenure at UDC O'Hara served as the founding dean of CAUSES from 2012 to 2019, and founding director of the Ph.D. program in Urban Leadership and Entrepreneurship from 2019 to 2024. In 2020 she transitioned to the rank of distinguished professor. She is the founder and principal of Global Ecology, LLC and serves as managing director and Vice President of Professors Beyond Borders.

Before joining UDC, O'Hara served as director of public policy of the NY State Council of Churches, faculty member at Rensselaer Polytechnic Institute, provost and professor of economics at Green Mountain College, president of Roanoke College, and executive director of the Council for International Exchange of Scholars (CIES).

O'Hara's funded research has included collaborations with the District Department of Energy and Environment and the National Institute of Food and Agriculture of the United States Department of Agriculture.

== Research and scholarly works ==
O'Hara's research focuses on community-based sustainable development, urban resilience, urban food systems, linkages between urban agriculture and green infrastructure, and the economic, social, and environmental impacts of urban development.

She is associated with the concept of sustaining production, later termed restorative economics, which emphasizes the limits of environmental and social "sink" capacities in economic systems. At the University of the District of Columbia, she launched the Urban Food Hubs initiative, a circular urban food system model integrating food production, processing, distribution, and waste and water management to improve food access, public health, resilience, and local economic opportunity.

Her monograph, Food Justice in American Cities: Stories of Health and Resilience (2023), examines food insecurity in U.S. cities and the role of emerging food and agriculture initiatives, and received first prize in the food security category at the Gourmand World Cookbook Awards in 2025. Her earlier book-length work includes Higher Education in Africa: Equity, Access, Opportunity (2010).

O'Hara has published in peer-reviewed journals including Ecological Economics, Sustainability, Review of Social Economy, World, and Frontiers in Sustainable Cities. Her recent articles address topics including community-based sustainable development, the hydrological cycle as driver of economic capacity, climate change, food policy, and urban agriculture. Central to her work is the role of community experts in defining the goals and metrics of economics development in general and food systems in particular. Her earlier scholarship, dating to the 1990s, includes contributions to ecological economics, sustainability theory, and the ethical dimensions of economic development.

She served as president of the International Society for Ecological Economics (2012–2016) and the United States Society for Ecological Economics (2007–2010), and was a member of the board of the Council of Scientific Society Presidents (2008–2011).

== Selected publications ==
- O'Hara, Sabine (2025-03-11). "Living in the Age of Market Economics: An Analysis of Formal and Informal Institutions and Global Climate Change". World. 6 (1): 35. doi:10.3390/world6010035. ISSN 2673-4060.
- Hampton, Midas; O'Hara, Sabine (2024-06-19). "Prosperity in progress: a new look at archetypes of successful community development". Frontiers in Sustainable Cities. 6. doi:10.3389/frsc.2024.1408673. ISSN 2624-9634.
- O'Hara, Sabine; Ahmadi, Golnar; Hampton, Midas; Dunson, Konyka (2023-03-27). "Telling Our Story—A Community-Based Meso-Level Approach to Sustainable Community Development". Sustainability. 15 (7): 5795. doi:10.3390/su15075795. ISSN 2071-1050.
- O'Hara, Sabine; Kakovitch, Thomas S. (2023). "Water as driver of economic capacity: Introducing a physical economic model". Ecological Economics. 208 107811. doi:10.1016/j.ecolecon.2023.107811. ISSN 0921-8009.
- Shariatmadary, Haniyeh; O'Hara, Sabine; Graham, Rebecca; Stuiver, Marian (2023-06-23). "Assessing Sustainability Priorities of U.S. Food Hub Managers: Results from a National Survey". Foods. 12 (13): 2458. doi:10.3390/foods12132458. ISSN 2304-8158. PMC 10341349. PMID 37444196.
- O'Hara, Sabine; Naicker, Sigamoney (2022-10-01). "Local Commitment and Global Reach: Advancing Sustainable Capacity Building in Higher Education". World. 3 (4): 783–801. doi:10.3390/world3040044. ISSN 2673-4060.
- O'Hara, Sabine; Stuiver, Marian (2022-06-22), "Chapter 9: Restorative economics – food hubs as catalysts of a new urban economy", The symbiotic city, Brill | Wageningen Academic, pp. 187–204, ISBN 978-90-8686-935-0
- Stuiver, Marian; O'Hara, Sabine (2021-07-13). "Food Connects Washington DC in 2050—A Vision for Urban Food Systems as the Centerpieces of a Circular Economy". Sustainability. 13 (14): 7821. doi:10.3390/su13147821. ISSN 2071-1050.
- O'Hara, Sabine; Toussaint, Etienne C. (2021). "Food access in crisis: Food security and COVID-19". Ecological Economics. 180 106859. doi:10.1016/j.ecolecon.2020.106859. ISSN 0921-8009.
