= Suzanne Bergeron =

Canadian abstract painter

- Born: June 23, 1930; Causapscal, Quebec
- Died: November 19, 1998 (aged 68); Quebec City, Quebec
- Spouse: Jean-Claude Suhit

Suzanne Bergeron (June 23, 1930 – November 19, 1998) was a Canadian abstract painter.

== Career ==
Bergeron (born at Causapscal near the Gaspé Peninsula, Québec), studied painting with Jean Paul Lemieux at the École des beaux-arts de Québec (EBAQ) , graduating in 1953. In 1955 she held her first solo show at Galerie Agnès Lefort and in the same year, she won the second prize for painting from the Prix de Concours Artistiques de la Province du Quebec for study in Paris. In Paris she was awarded the Prix de la Ville de Paris and a Canada Council grant in 1957. She studied at the École du Louvre while in Paris (1957-1958). She was invited to exhibit with the École de Paris in an exhibition travelling through France in 1957. In 1958, she returned to Canada. In 1959, she held a solo show at Galerie Agnès Lefort. She also exhibited in the following group shows: Biennale Sao Paulo (1959); NYC (1959); Mexican Biennale (1960); Roberts Gallery, Toronto (1962); and the Canadian Biennial (1963). A successful solo show at Lefort's Gallery in 1963 was followed by her return to Paris on a Canada Council grant. She held solos and took part in group shows in Paris, London, Amsterdam, Brussels, São Paulo, and New York.

From the years 1974 to 1990 she was seriously ill. She recovered, and continued to work as an artist. Most of her life was spent in Quebec City where she died.

Critic Dorothy Pfieffer described Bergeron as, "a painter of clean, clear and frosty below-zero atmosphere."

== Collections ==
Her work is included in the collections of the Musée national des beaux-arts du Québec, the Montreal Museum of Fine Arts, the Art Gallery of Ontario, the Art Gallery of Greater Victoria and the National Gallery of Canada
