= Human Development and Capability Association =

Organization

- Abbreviation: HDCA
- Formation: September 2004
- Founder: Amartya Sen
- Legal status: Association
- Purpose: Promoting research in human development and the capability approach
- Professional title: Human Development and Capability Association
- Location: Francois Xavier Bagnound Center, Boston, Massachusetts
- Coordinates: 42°20′7.5012″N 71°6′7.4600″W
- President: Ravi Kanbur

The Human Development and Capability Association (HDCA) was launched in September 2004 at the Fourth Capability Conference in Pavia, Italy. It was founded to promote research from many disciplines on key problems including poverty, justice, well-being, and economics.

The Association holds annual conferences; maintains a website and mailing list; supports training activities; and provides a forum in which collaborative research can emerge.

The HDCA also produces a peer-reviewed journal, the Journal of Human Development and Capabilities: A Multi-Disciplinary Journal for People-Centered Development. The association is supported by the Canadian International Development Research Centre (IDRC).

== Presidents ==
The economist and nobel Laureate Amartya Sen was the founding president and remained President until 2006 when philosopher, Martha Nussbaum, took over. She was succeeded in 2008 by Frances Stewart, who specializes in development studies. Economist Kaushik Basu became president in 2010 and was replaced by another economist, Tony Atkinson, in 2012.

The next president was the philosopher, Henry S. Richardson; he became president in September 2014 and served until 2016. The current president, economist Ravi Kanbur, took the position in September 2016 after completing one year as president elect. Kanbur serves until September 2018.

== Fellows ==
List of HDCA Fellows as of December 2015.

A

- Bina Agarwal
- Sabina Alkire
- Paul Anand
- P B Anand
- Sudhir Anand
- Elizabeth S. Anderson
- Proochista Ariana
- Tony Atkinson
- Ken Arrow

B

- Kaushik Basu
- Mario Biggeri
- François Bourguignon
- Andrea Brandolini
- Harry Brighouse
- Tania Burchardt

C

- Satya Chakravarty
- Enrica Chiappero-Martinetti
- David Clark
- Joshua Cohen
- David Crocker

D

- Séverine Deneulin
- Keith Dowding
- Jean Drèze
- Jay Drydyk
- Jean Luc Dubois
- Anantha Duraiappah

F

- James E. Foster
- Sakiko Fukuda-Parr

G

- Wulf Gaertner
- Des Gasper
- Ann Goldin

H

- John Hammock
- David Hulme

I

- Solava Ibrahim
- Javier Iguiñiz

K

- Ravi Kanbur
- Stephan Klasen
- Jeni Klugman
- Jaya Krishnakumar
- Barbara Ky

L

- Ortrud Lessmann
- Luis Felipe Lopez-Calva

M

- Henk Manschot
- Guillermo Bornemann Martinez
- Mark McGillivray
- Allister McGregor

N

- Adil Najam
- Zina Nimeh
- Farhad Noorbakhsh
- Martha Nussbaum

O

- Avner Offner
- Ilse Oosterlaken
- Siddiqur R. Osmani

P

- Prasanta K. Pattanaik
- Philip Pettit
- Antonella Picchio
- Thomas Pogge
- Antoanneta Potsi
- Hilary Putnam

Q

- Mozaffar Qizilbash

R

- Sanjay Reddy
- Henry S. Richardson
- Ingrid Robeyns
- José Manuel Roche

S

- Michael J Sandel
- Erik Schokkaert
- Amartya Sen
- Randy Spence
- Frances Stewart
- Subbu Subramanian
- Robert Sugden
- Kotaro Suzumura

T

- Lorella Terzi
- Erik Thorbecke
- Graciela Tonon
- John Toye

U

- Elaine Unterhalter

V

- Martin van Hees
- Sridhar Venkatapuram
- Andrea Vigorito
- Polly Vizard

W

- Melanie Walker
- Gareth Wall
- Maria Monica Wihardja
- Jonathan Wolff

Z

- Stefano Zamagni

== See also ==
- Capability approach
- Demographic economics
- Economic development
- Important publications in development economics
- International Association for Feminist Economics
- International development
- Journal of Human Development and Capabilities
- Oxford Poverty and Human Development Initiative
- Sustainable development
- UN Human Development Index
- Welfare economics
- Women's education and development
