= Limitarianism =

Limitarianism may refer to:

- Limitarianism (Christianity), which teaches that Christ's atonement applies only to the elect
- Limitarianism (ethical), which asserts prima facie duties to satisfy urgent needs and to prioritize political equality
