= Journal of Human Development and Capabilities =

- Discipline: People-centered development and capabilities
- Language: English
- Edited by: Enrica Chiappero-Martinetti

Publication details
- Former name(s): Journal of Human Development
- History: 2000-present
- Publisher: Routledge
- Frequency: Quarterly
- Impact factor: 1.516 (2018)

Standard abbreviations
- ISO 4: J. Hum. Dev. Capab.

Indexing
- ISSN: 1945-2829 (print); 1945-2837 (web)
- LCCN: 2008202113
- OCLC no.: 247416875

Links
- Journal homepage; Online access; Online archive; Journal page at association's website

The Journal of Human Development and Capabilities is a peer-reviewed academic journal in the field of people-centered human development and capabilities. It is published by Routledge on behalf of the Human Development and Capability Association. It was established in 2000 as the Journal of Human Development, obtaining its current title in 2009. Its founding editors-in-chief were Khadija Haq (Mahbub ul Haq Human Development Center), Richard Jolly (Institute of Development Studies), and Sakiko Fukuda-Parr (United Nations Development Programme).

== Abstracting and indexing ==
The journal is abstracted and indexed in the International Bibliography of the Social Sciences, Social Sciences Citation Index, and Current Contents/Social & Behavioral Sciences. According to the Journal Citation Reports, the journal has a 2012 impact factor of 0.736.
