= Inequality Reexamined =

Book by Amartya Sen

- Author: Amartya Sen
- Language: English
- Publisher: Harvard University Press
- Publication date: 1992

Inequality Reexamined is a 1992 book by the economist Amartya Sen. In the book Sen evaluates the different perspectives of the general notion of inequality, focusing mainly on his well-known capability approach. The author argues that inequality is a central notion to every social theory that has stood on time. For only if this basic feature is satisfied can a social theory which advocates a set of social arrangements be plausible. Taken the inequality ingredient for granted, the crucial question becomes: inequality of what? Sen answers this basic question by advocating his preferred notion of equality which is based on the capability for Functions.

== Functionings and the role of freedom ==
There are two kinds of Functions: Elementary and Social. Elementary Functions include being in good health, nourished, sheltered. More complex are Social Functions, which include having self-respect, taking part in the life of the community etc. The Achievement of an individual is the set of these realized Functions. Capability refers to the real options that someone has in order to pursue the subjective Functions they prefer most. Nevertheless, inequalities related to class, gender, communities hinder the extent of human freedom and thus decrease our ability to function. That is why a good society ought to mitigate such discrimination, promoting people's freedom which, is the most valuable element of a satisfactory life.

== Editions ==
- Amartya Sen (1992). Inequality Reexamined. Harvard University Press. ISBN 0-674-45255-0. - First Hardcover
- Amartya Sen (1995). Inequality Reexamined. Harvard University Press. ISBN 0-674-45256-9. - Paperback Reprint
