= Sabina Alkire =

Philosopher (born 1969)

The Reverend Sabina Alkire
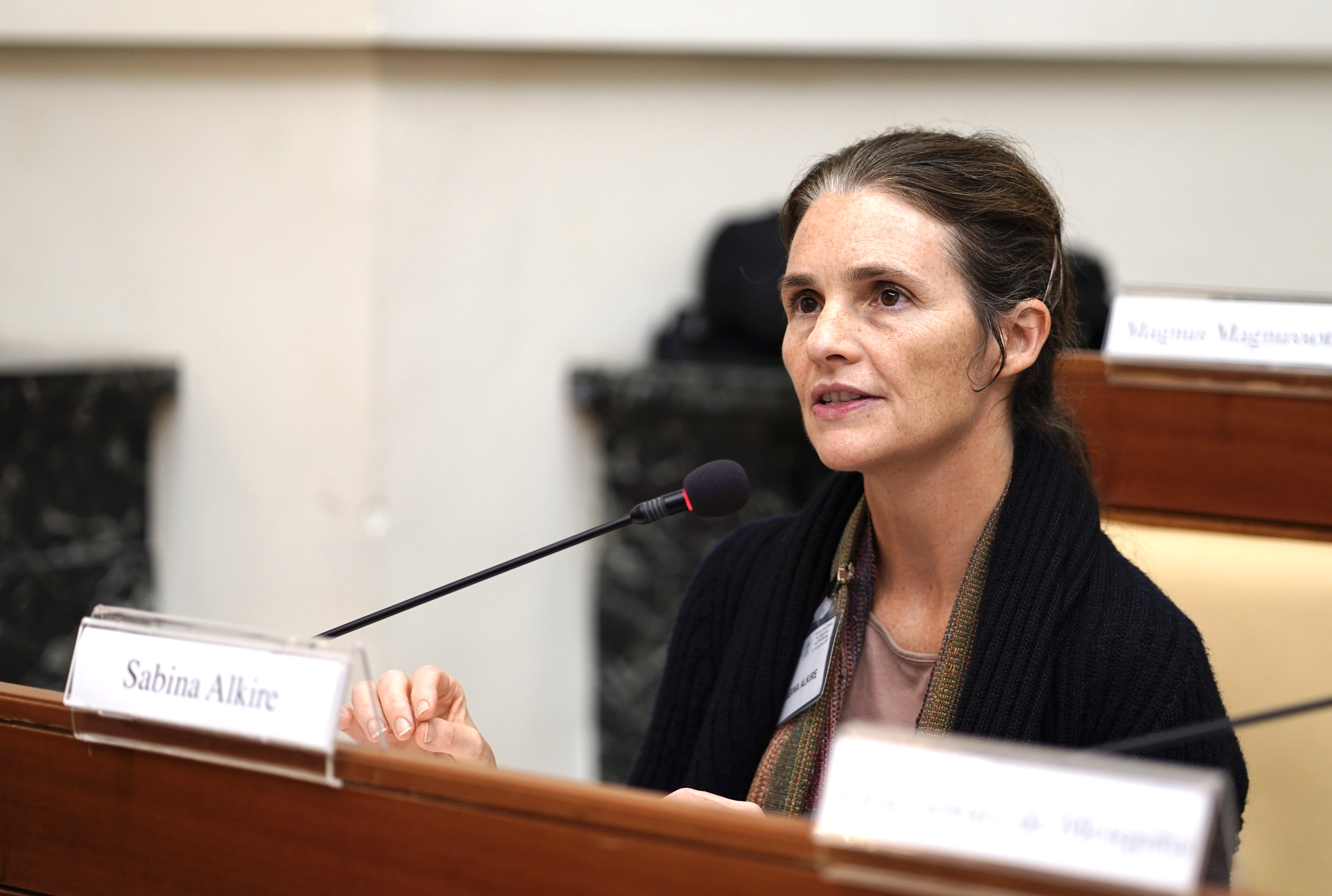
- Alkire in 2019
- Born: 1969 (age 56–57); Göttingen, Germany

Academic background
- Education: University of Illinois at Urbana-Champaign (BA); Magdalen College, University of Oxford (MPhil, MSc, DPhil)
- Influences: Amartya Sen; Martha Nussbaum

Academic work
- Discipline: Welfare economics, development economics, Ethics
- School or tradition: Capability approach
- Institutions: University of Oxford Poverty and Human Development Initiative
- Notable ideas: Human development theory
- Website: Information at IDEAS / RePEc

Notes
- Thesis Operationalizing Amartya Sen's capability approach to human development: a framework for identifying valuable capabilities. (1998)

Sabina Alkire is an American academic and Anglican priest, who is the director of the Oxford Poverty and Human Development Initiative (OPHI), an economic research centre within the Oxford Department of International Development at the University of Oxford, England, which was established in 2007. She is a fellow of the Human Development and Capability Association. She has worked with organizations such as the Commission on the Measurement of Economic Performance and Social Progress, the United Nations Human Development Programme Human Development Report Office, the European Commission, and the UK's Department for International Development.

Alkire and fellow OPHI member economist James Foster developed the Alkire Foster Method, a method of measuring multidimensional poverty. It includes identifying 'who is poor' by considering the range of deprivations they suffer, and aggregating that information to reflect societal poverty. The application and implementation of the Alkire-Foster (AF) method produced a Multidimensional Poverty Index (MPI), a tool to identify the range of poverty among a population based on specified indicators.

== Biography ==
Born in Göttingen, West Germany, she left to the United States of America as a baby when her father took up a role teaching chemical engineering at the University of Illinois at Urbana–Champaign. Alkire studied at the same university, graduating in 1989 with a Bachelor of Arts in sociology and pre-medicine. Afterwards, Alkire moved to England and attended the University of Oxford as a Rhodes Scholar, where she obtained a diploma of theology with a distinction in Islam in 1992, then a Master of Philosophy in Christian political ethics and a Master of Science in economics for development in 1994 and 1995, respectively. For her Master of Science thesis, "The Full or Minimally Decent Life: Empiricization of Sen's Capabilities Approach in Poverty Measurement", she was awarded the George Webb Medley Graduate Prize by the university. Later, she gained her doctorate in economics from Magdalen College, University of Oxford in 1999. Her doctoral thesis, which demonstrated how the work of Indian economist and philosopher Amartya Sen could be coherently and practically put to use in poverty reduction activities, was later published as a monograph with the title Valuing Freedoms: Sen's Capability Approach and Poverty Reduction (2002).

From 1999 to 2001, Alkire worked as the coordinator for Culture and Poverty Learning-Research Program, PREM, World Bank. From 2001 to 2003, she moved on to working for the Commission on Human Security as a research writer. From 2003 to 2013 Alkire continued her career as a research associate at the Harvard Global Equity Initiative at Harvard University. During her time there she won the Thulin Scholar of Religion and Contemporary Culture award from the University of Illinois at Urbana–Champaign and was listed in Foreign Policy Magazine "100 global thinkers 2010".

She served as the Oliver T. Carr, Jr. Professor in International Affairs at the Elliott School at The George Washington University, in Washington, D.C. from 2015 until 2016. She currently holds positions as the director of OPHI, associate professor at the Department of International Development at the University of Oxford, and is a distinguished research affiliate of the Kellogg Institute for International studies at the University of Notre Dame. Recently, as director of OPHI, Alkire has led research teams to aid with publications such as "The real wealth of nations", for the United Nations Development Programme's Human Development Report.

In May 2020, Alkire was awarded the Boris Mints Institute Prize for Research of Strategic Policy Solutions to Global Challenges for her contribution to the understanding of the dynamics and implications of poverty. Alkire's research interests include, multidimensional poverty measurement and analysis, welfare economics, the capability approach, and the measurement of freedoms and human development.

=== Ordained ministry ===
Alkire was ordained in the Episcopal Church (United States) as a deacon in 2000 and as a priest in 2002. From 2000 to 2003, she was a non-stipendiary minister at St. Alban's Episcopal Church and St. Philip the Evangelist Episcopal Church in Washington, D.C. in the Episcopal Diocese of Washington. She then moved to St. Stephen's Episcopal Church, Boston, in the Episcopal Diocese of Massachusetts. Having returned to England, she has been an honorary chaplain and chapel associate of Magdalen College, Oxford. In addition, from 2008 to 2019, she was a non-stipendiary minister in the benefice of Cowley St John in the Church of England's Diocese of Oxford; she continues as an associate priest.

== Bibliography ==
=== Thesis ===
- Alkire, Sabina (1998). Operationalizing Amartya Sen's capability approach to human development: a framework for identifying valuable capabilities (D.Phil. thesis). University of Oxford. OCLC 43087376.

=== Books ===
- Alkire, Sabina (2002). Valuing freedoms: Sen's capability approach and poverty reduction. Oxford New York: Oxford University Press. ISBN 978-0-19-924579-6. Hardback.
- Alkire, Sabina (2005). Valuing freedoms: Sen's capability approach and poverty reduction. Oxford New York: Oxford University Press. ISBN 978-0-19-928331-6. Paperback.
- Reviewed by Robeyns, Ingrid (October 2003). "Valuing freedoms: Sen's capability approach and poverty reduction, by Sabina Alkire". Economics and Philosophy. 19 (2): 371–377. doi:10.1017/S0266267103231229. S2CID 153529212.
- Alkire, Sabina; Comim, Flavio; Qizilbash, Mozaffar (2008). The capability approach: concepts, measures and applications. Cambridge etc: Cambridge University Press. ISBN 978-0-521-15452-9.
- Alkire, Sabina; Ura, Karma; Zangmo, Tshoki (2012). GNH and the GNH Index: A short guide to gross national happiness index. Thimphu: Centre for Bhutan Studies. ISBN 978-99936-14-66-1.
- Alkire, Sabina; Wangdi, Karma; Zangmo, Tshoki (2012). An extensive analysis of GNH index. Thimphu, Bhutan: Centre for Bhutan Studies. ISBN 978-99936-14-67-8.

=== Chapters in books ===
2000–2004

- Alkire, Sabina (2000), "The basic dimensions of human flourishing: a comparison of accounts", in Biggar, Nigel; Black, Rufus (eds.), The revival of natural law: philosophical, theological, and ethical responses to the Finnis-Grisez School, Aldershot, Hants, England Burlington, VT: Ashgate, pp. 73–100, ISBN 978-0-7546-1262-9
- Alkire, Sabina; Deneulin, Séverine (2002), "Individual motivation, its nature, determinants and consequences for within-group behaviour", in Heyer, Judith; Stewart, Frances; Thorp, Rosemary (eds.), Group behaviour and development: is the market destroying cooperation, Oxford New York: Oxford University Press, pp. 51–73, ISBN 978-0-19-925692-1
- Alkire, Sabina (2002), "Global citizenship and common values", in Dower, Nigel; Williams, John (eds.), Global citizenship: a critical reader, Edinburgh: Edinburgh University Press, pp. 169–182, ISBN 978-0-7486-1547-6
- Alkire, Sabina (2003), "Public debate and value construction in Sen's approach", in Chen, Lincoln C; Fukuda-Parr, Sakiko; Seidensticker, Ellen (eds.), Human insecurity in a global world, Cambridge, Mass: Global Equity Initiative, Asia Center Harvard University Distributed by Harvard University Press, pp. 15–40, ISBN 978-0-674-01454-1
- Alkire, Sabina (2004), "Public debate and value construction in Sen's approach", in Rao, Vidjayendra; Walton, Michael (eds.), Culture and public action: a cross-disciplinary dialogue on development policy, Stanford, California: Stanford University Press Stanford Social Sciences, pp. 185–209, ISBN 978-0-8047-4787-5
- Alkire, Sabina (2004), "Public debate and value construction in Sen's approach", in Kaufman, Alexander (ed.), Capabilities equality basic issues and problems, City: Routledge, pp. 133–154, ISBN 978-0-415-49978-1

2005–2009

- Alkire, Sabina (2005), "Needs and capabilities", in Reader, Soran (ed.), The philosophy of need, Cambridge, U.K. New York: Cambridge University Press, pp. 229–252, ISBN 978-0-521-67844-5
- Alkire, Sabina (2006), "Structural injustice and democratic practice: the trajectory in Sen's writings", in Deneulin, Séverine; Nebel, Mathias; Sagovsky, Nicholas (eds.), Transforming unjust structures: the capability approach, Dordrecht, the Netherlands: Springer, pp. 47–62, ISBN 978-1-4020-4432-8
- Alkire, Sabina; Chen, Lincoln (2006), "Medical exceptionalism in international migration: should doctors and nurses be treated differently?", in Tamas, Kristof; Palme, Joakim (eds.), Globalizing migration regimes new challenges to transnational cooperation (research in migration and ethnic relations series), Aldershot, Hants, England Burlington, VT: Ashgate, pp. 100–117, ISBN 978-0-7546-4692-1
- Alkire, Sabina (2007), "Religion and development", in Clark, David A (ed.), The Elgar companion to development studies, Cheltenham: Edward Elgar, pp. 502–510, ISBN 978-1-84720-624-4
- Alkire, Sabina (2007), "Measuring freedoms alongside well-being", in Gough, Ian; McGregor, J. Allister (eds.), Wellbeing in developing countries: from theory to research, Cambridge New York: Cambridge University Press, pp. 93–108, ISBN 978-0-521-85751-2
- Alkire, Sabina (2007), "Choosing dimensions: the capability approach and multidimensional poverty", in Kakwani, Nanak; Silber, Jaques (eds.), The many dimensions of poverty, Basingstoke England New York: Palgrave Macmillan, pp. 89–119, ISBN 978-0-230-00490-0
- Alkire, Sabina; Comim, Flavio; Qizilbash, Mozaffar (2008), "Introduction", in Alkire, Sabina; Comim, Flavio; Qizilbash, Mozaffar (eds.), The capability approach: concepts, measures and applications, Cambridge etc: Cambridge University Press, pp. 1–25, ISBN 978-0-521-15452-9
- Alkire, Sabina (2008), "Using the capability approach: prospective and evaluative analyses", in Alkire, Sabina; Comim, Flavio; Qizilbash, Mozaffar (eds.), The capability approach: concepts, measures and applications, Cambridge etc: Cambridge University Press, pp. 26–50, ISBN 978-0-521-15452-9
- Alkire, Sabina (2009), "Concepts and measures of agency", in Basu, Kaushik; Kanbur, Ravi (eds.), Arguments for a better world: essays in honor of Amartya Sen, volume 1 ethics, welfare and measurement, Oxford New York: Oxford University Press, pp. 455–474, ISBN 978-0-19-923911-5
- Alkire, Sabina (2009), "Amartya Sen", in Peil, Jan; van Staveren, Irene (eds.), Handbook of economics and ethics, Cheltenham, UK Northampton, Massachusetts: Edward Elgar, pp. 484–492, ISBN 978-1-84542-936-2
- Alkire, Sabina; Foster, James (2009), "Counting and multidimensional poverty", in von Braun, Joachim; Hill, Ruth Vargas; Pandya-Lorch, Rajul (eds.), The poorest and hungry: assessments, analyses, and actions: an IFPRI 2020 book, Washington, D.C: International Food Policy Research Institute (IFPRI), pp. 77–90, ISBN 978-0-89629-660-2
- Alkire, Sabina (2009), "A normative framework for development", in Deneulin, Séverine; Shahani, Lila (eds.), An introduction to the human development and capability approach freedom and agency, Sterling, Virginia Ottawa, Ontario: Earthscan International Development Research Centre, pp. 3–21, ISBN 978-1-84407-806-6
- Alkire, Sabina (2009), "The human development and capability approach", in Deneulin, Séverine; Shahani, Lila (eds.), An introduction to the human development and capability approach freedom and agency, Sterling, Virginia Ottawa, Ontario: Earthscan International Development Research Centre, pp. 22–48, ISBN 978-1-84407-806-6
- Alkire, Sabina; Santos, Maria E (2009), "Poverty and inequality measurement", in Deneulin, Séverine; Shahani, Lila (eds.), An introduction to the human development and capability approach freedom and agency, Sterling, Virginia Ottawa, Ontario: Earthscan International Development Research Centre, pp. 121–161, ISBN 978-1-84407-806-6
- Alkire, Sabina (2009), "The capability approach as a development paradigm", in Chiappero-Martinetti, Enrica (ed.), Debating global society: reach and limits of the capability approach, Milan: Fondazione Giangiacomo Feltrinelli, ISBN 978-88-380-0264-9
- Alkire, Sabina (2009), "Development: 'a misconceived theory can kill'", in Morris, Christopher (ed.), Amartya Sen, Cambridge New York: Cambridge University Press, pp. 191–220, ISBN 978-0-521-61806-9

2010 onwards

- Alkire, Sabina (2009), "Development: a misconceived theory can kill", in Morris, Christopher W (ed.), Amartya Sen: contemporary philosophy in focus, Cambridge New York: Cambridge University Press, pp. 191–120, ISBN 978-0-521-61806-9
- Alkire, Sabina; Roche, José Manuel (2012), "Beyond headcount: measures that reflect the breadth and components of child poverty", in Minujin, Alberto; Nandy, Shailen (eds.), Global child poverty and well-being: measurement, concepts, policy and action, Bristol, UK Chicago, IL: Policy Press, pp. 103–134, ISBN 978-1-84742-481-5
- Alkire, Sabina; Roche, José Manuel (2012), "Beyond headcount: the Alkire-Foster approach to multidimensional child poverty measurement", in Ortiz, Isabel; Daniels, Louise M; Engilbertsdóttir, Sólrún (eds.), Child poverty and inequality: new perspectives, New York: UNICEF, pp. 18–22, ISBN 978-1-105-53175-0
- Alkire, Sabina; Ura, Karma; Zangmo, Tshoki (2012), "5. Case study Bhutan: gross national happiness and the GNH index", in Helliwell, John; Layard, Richard; Jeffrey D, Sachs (eds.), World happiness report, New York: Earth Institute, Columbia University

=== Journal articles ===
1990–1999

- Alkire, Sabina (November 1994). "This unemployment: disaster or opportunity?". Theology. 97 (780): 402–413. doi:10.1177/0040571X9409700602. S2CID 156922667.
- Alkire, Sabina; Black, Rufus (March 1997). "A practical reasoning theory of development ethics: furthering the capabilities approach". Journal of International Development. 9 (2): 263–279. doi:10.1002/(SICI)1099-1328(199703)9:2<263::AID-JID439>3.0.CO;2-D.

2000–2009

- Alkire, Sabina (2002). "A conceptual framework for human security - working paper no. 2" (PDF). Center for Research on Inequality, Human Security and Ethnicity (CRISE), Queen Elizabeth House. Archived from the original (PDF) on 2014-04-18.
- Alkire, Sabina (February 2002). "Dimensions of human development". World Development. 30 (2): 181–205. doi:10.1016/S0305-750X(01)00109-7.
- Alkire, Sabina; Chen, Lincoln (September 2004). "Global health and moral values". The Lancet. 364 (9439): 1069–1074. doi:10.1016/S0140-6736(04)17063-3. PMC 7123313. PMID 15380967.
- Alkire, Sabina (2005). "Why the capability approach?". Journal of Human Development. 6 (1): 115–135. doi:10.1080/146498805200034275. S2CID 15074994.
- Alkire, Sabina (October 2005). "Subjective quantitative studies of human agency". Social Indicators Research. 74 (1): 217–260. doi:10.1007/s11205-005-6525-0. S2CID 145398750.
- Alkire, Sabina (2007). "The missing dimensions of poverty data: introduction to the special issue". Oxford Development Studies. 35 (4): 347–359. doi:10.1080/13600810701701863. S2CID 154117584.
- Alkire, Sabina; Ibrahim, Solava (2007). "Agency and empowerment: a proposal for internationally comparable indicators". Oxford Development Studies. 35 (4): 379–403. doi:10.1080/13600810701701897. S2CID 17256768. Archived from the original on 2020-10-30.
- Alkire, Sabina; Seth, Suman (July 2008). "Determining BPL status: some methodological improvements". Indian Journal of Human Development. 2 (2): 407–424. doi:10.1177/0973703020080207. S2CID 154512070. Archived from the original on 2024-03-13.
- Alkire, Sabina; Xiaolin, Wang (2009). "Measurement of multidimensional poverty in China: estimations and policy implications". Chinese Rural Economy. 12: 4–10. Archived from the original on 2024-03-13.

2010 onwards

- Alkire, Sabina; Foster, James (August 2011). "Counting and multidimensional poverty measurement". Journal of Public Economics. 95 (7–8): 476–487. doi:10.1016/j.jpubeco.2010.11.006. S2CID 6113312.
- Alkire, Sabina; Foster, James (June 2011). "Understandings and misunderstandings of multidimensional poverty measurement". Journal of Economic Inequality. 9 (2): 289–314. doi:10.1007/s10888-011-9181-4. S2CID 1219162.
- Alkire, Sabina; Foster, James; Santos, Maria E (September 2011). "Where did identification go?". Journal of Economic Inequality. 9 (3): 501–505. doi:10.1007/s10888-011-9201-4. hdl:11336/102359.
- Alkire, Sabina; Santos, Maria E (June 2013). "A multidimensional approach: poverty measurement and beyond". Social Indicators Research. 112 (2): 239–257. doi:10.1007/s11205-013-0257-3. hdl:11336/2002.
- Alkire, Sabina; Seth, Suman (June 2013). "Selecting a targeting method to identify BPL households in India". Social Indicators Research. 112 (2): 417–446. doi:10.1007/s11205-013-0254-6. S2CID 16061965.
- Alkire, Sabina; Seth, Suman (12 January 2013). "Identifying BPL households: a comparison of methods". Economic and Political Weekly. 48 (2): 49–57.
- Alkire, Sabina; Meinzen-Dick, Ruth; Peterman, Amber; Quisumbing, Agnes; Seymour, Greg; Vaz, Ana (December 2013). "The women's empowerment in agriculture index". World Development. 52: 71–91. doi:10.1016/j.worlddev.2013.06.007. hdl:10535/8724.
- Alkire, Sabina (July 2014). "Measuring acute poverty in the developing world: robustness and scope of the multidimensional poverty index". World Development. 59: 251–274. doi:10.1016/j.worlddev.2014.01.026. hdl:11336/2085.
- Alkire, Sabina; Vaz, Ana; Pratley, Pierre (January 2016). "Measuring women's autonomy in Chad using the Relative Autonomy Index". Feminist Economics. 22 (1): 264–294. doi:10.1080/13545701.2015.1108991. S2CID 154561813.

=== Other publications ===
Human Development and Capability Association Briefing Note

- Alkire, Sabina (2005). "Capability and functionings: definition & justification". HDCA Introductory Briefing Note.

Agence Française de Développement and European Development Research Network (AFD-EUDN) Conference Paper

- Alkire, Sabina (2011). "Beyond monetary poverty: multidimensional poverty and its discontents" (PDF). Measure for Measure: How Well do We Measure Development?, Proceedings of the 8th Agence Française de Développement (AFD) and European Development Research Network (EUDN) Conference 1 December 2010 Paris.

Oxford Poverty & Human Development Initiative (OPHI) Working Papers

- Alkire, Sabina; Ritchie, Angus (September 2007). "Winning ideas: lessons from free market economics". Oxford Poverty & Human Development Initiative (OPHI) Working Paper No. 6. Archived from the original on 2024-01-12.
- Alkire, Sabina (2010). "Human development: definitions, critiques and related concepts". Oxford Poverty & Human Development Initiative (OPHI) Working Paper No. 36; UNDP Human Development Report Background Paper 2010. ISBN 9781907194443
- Alkire, Sabina; Foster, James (2010). "Designing the inequality-adjusted human development index (HDI)". Oxford Poverty & Human Development Initiative (OPHI) Working Paper No. 37; UNDP Human Development Report Background Paper 2010/28. Archived from the original on 2024-01-11.
- Alkire, Sabina; Santos, Maria E (2010). "Acute multidimensional poverty: a new index for developing countries". Oxford Poverty & Human Development Initiative (OPHI) Working Paper No. 38; UNDP Human Development Report Background Paper 2010/11. Archived from the original on 2022-09-01. ISBN 9781907194221
- Alkire, Sabina; Santos, Maria E (March 2013). "Measuring acute poverty in the developing world: robustness and scope of the multidimensional poverty index". Oxford Poverty & Human Development Initiative (OPHI) Working Paper No. 59. Archived from the original on 2020-08-15. ISBN 9781907194443
- Alkire, Sabina; Seth, Suman (March 2013). "Multidimensional poverty reduction in India between 1999 and 2006: where and how?". Oxford Poverty & Human Development Initiative (OPHI) Working Paper No. 60. Archived from the original on 2024-01-12. ISBN 9781907194474
- Alkire, Sabina; Roche, José Manuel; Sumner, Andy (March 2013). "Where do the World's Multidimensionally Poor People Live?". Oxford Poverty & Human Development Initiative (OPHI) Working Paper No. 61. Archived from the original on 2024-01-12. ISBN 9781907194481
- Dirksen, Jakob; Alkire, Sabina (October 2021). "Children and Multidimensional Poverty: Four Measurement Strategies". Oxford Poverty & Human Development Initiative (OPHI) Working Paper No. 138. Archived from the original on 2024-01-11. ISBN 9781912291304

Oxford Poverty & Human Development Initiative (OPHI) Research in Progress Papers

- Alkire, Sabina; Apablaza, Mauricio; Jung, Eujin (December 2012). "Multidimensional poverty measurement for EU-SILC countries". Oxford Poverty & Human Development Initiative (OPHI) Research Paper: 36a. Archived from the original on 2022-06-25.
- Alkire, Sabina (January 2013). "Well-being, happiness and public policy". Oxford Poverty & Human Development Initiative (OPHI) Research Paper: 37a. Archived from the original on 2023-04-21.
- Alkire, Sabina; Seth, Suman; Roche, José Manuel; Sumner, Andy (January 2014). "Where do the world's poorest live? a multidimensional approach to the bottom billion". Oxford Poverty & Human Development Initiative (OPHI) Research Paper: 39a. Archived from the original on 2022-06-25.
- Alkire, Sabina; Kanagaratnam, Usha; Nogales, Ricardo; Suppa, Nicolai (June 2020). "Revising the Global Multidimensional Poverty Index: Empirical Insights and Robustness". Oxford Poverty & Human Development Initiative (OPHI) Research Paper: 56a. Archived from the original on 2022-08-09.
- Alkire, Sabina; Kovesdi, Fanni; Scheja, Elina; Vollmer, Frank (November 2020). "Moderate Multidimensional Poverty Index: Paving the Way out of Poverty". Oxford Poverty & Human Development Initiative (OPHI) Research Paper: 59a. Archived from the original on 2022-11-05.
- Alkire, Sabina; Kovesdi, Fanni (December 2020). "A Birdseye View of Well-being: Exploring a Multidimensional Measure for the United Kingdom". Oxford Poverty & Human Development Initiative (OPHI) Research Paper: 60a. Archived from the original on 2022-11-04.
- Alkire, Sabina; Nogales, Ricardo; Quinn, N. N.; Suppa, Nicolai (February 2021). "Global multidimensional poverty and COVID-19: A decade of progress at risk?". Oxford Poverty & Human Development Initiative (OPHI) Research Paper: 61a. 291 114457. doi:10.1016/j.socscimed.2021.114457. PMC 8500841. PMID 34757303. Archived from the original on 2022-10-06.

=== Forthcoming ===
- Alkire, Sabina; Ballon, Paola; Foster, James; Roche, José Manuel; Santos, Maria Emma; Seth, Suman (2014). Multidimensional poverty measurement and analysis: a counting approach. Oxford: Oxford University Press.

== See also ==
- Alkire Foster Method
- Feminist economics
- List of feminist economists
- Multidimensional Poverty Index
- Political philosophy
