= Elizabeth S. Anderson =

American philosopher (born 1959)

- Born: Elizabeth Secor Anderson; December 5, 1959 (age 66)
- Awards: Guggenheim Fellowship; MacArthur Fellows Program

Education
- Education: Swarthmore College (BA); Harvard University (MA, PhD)
- Thesis: Value in ethics and in economics (1987)
- Doctoral advisor: John Rawls

Philosophical work
- Era: Contemporary philosophy
- Region: Western philosophy
- School: Analytic; Pragmatism
- Institutions: University of Michigan
- Main interests: Political philosophy; social philosophy; ethics; feminist philosophy; political economy; history of philosophy; philosophy of social science; social epistemology

Elizabeth Secor Anderson (born December 5, 1959) is an American philosopher at the University of Michigan specializing in social and political philosophy, ethics, feminist philosophy, and political economy.

== Early life ==
Anderson was born December 5, 1959 to Evelyn Anderson (née Gordon), a freelance journalist, and Olof Anderson, an aeronautical engineer at United Technologies. Her mother was Jewish and her father was raised Swedish Lutheran. Anderson has one brother, Andrew Anderson. She was born premature and underweight, and she remained smaller than her peers throughout childhood. Anderson had a lisp as a child.

Anderson was raised in Manchester, Connecticut. She described her parents as active in their local community and social during her childhood. They helped found a Unitarian Universalist worship space and participated in Democratic politics, with her father being elected to the Manchester city council as a Democrat in 1963. (Note: Anderson's parents began affiliating with Republicans soon after, however, with her father voting for Richard Nixon in 1968 and both parents later supporting Donald Trump.) While he was in office, Anderson's parents helped found the Manchester Community College. In contrast, Anderson often felt awkward and anxious growing up. This discomfort in part led her to reading. “Books were secure—this was something I could master and control," she said of her childhood. Anderson became interested in philosophy in high school after her father introduced her to On Liberty by John Stuart Mill and Plato's Republic, but she anticipated studying math and economics. Anderson graduated from Manchester High School in 1977.

== Education and career ==
Anderson received a B.A. with high honors in philosophy with a minor in economics from Swarthmore College in 1981. She began her undergraduate studies as a "really confirmed capitalist libertarian." She was primarily interested in economics but found that it was "making all kinds of assumptions with moral content, but which it wasn't really able to justify or understand," leading her to study philosophy instead.

In 1979, while on summer break from Swarthmore, Anderson worked as a bookkeeper at a bank in Harvard Square (Cambridge, Massachusetts). Her experiences working at the bank led her to reflect on inequality, freedom, and the nature of work—all of which later became subjects of her academic writing.

Anderson's first academic article, criticizing relational theories of space in ontology, was published in 1980 while she was still an undergraduate student at Swarthmore. She was the second author alongside Hugh M. Lacey, a professor of philosophy.

In 1987, Anderson completed a Ph.D. in Philosophy at Harvard University. Her studies focused on political and moral philosophy under the mentorship of John Rawls. Martha Nussbaum was one of her instructors.

From 1985 to 1986, Anderson was a visiting instructor of philosophy at Swarthmore College, and in 1987 she was hired as an assistant professor of philosophy at the University of Michigan. She was Associate Professor of Philosophy and Women's Studies from 1993 to 1999 and was promoted to full professorship in 1999. In 1994, she was named an Arthur F. Thurnau Professor in recognition of her "outstanding contributions to undergraduate education." From 2005 to 2013, she was the John Rawls Collegiate Professor of Philosophy and Women's Studies. In 2011, Anderson helped found and served as the director of the University of Michigan's Philosophy, Politics, and Economics undergraduate program. In 2013, she was elevated to the University of Michigan's highest professorship and selected John Dewey as her chair, making her the John Dewey Distinguished University Professor of Philosophy and Women's Studies. From 2021 to 2025, Anderson was the Max Shaye Professor of Public Philosophy. She has been a Professor of Law by courtesy since 2024.

Anderson is the recipient of numerous awards and grants, and holds numerous honorary academic positions. In 2013, she received a Guggenheim Fellowship, and in 2019, a "Genius Grant" from the MacArthur Fellows Program. She was elected to the American Academy of Arts and Sciences in 2008, to the British Academy in 2020, and the American Philosophical Society in 2021. Anderson was named a Progress Medal Laureate in February 2018 by the Society for Progress for her book Private Government: How Employers Rule Our Lives (and Why We Don't Talk about It). Anderson was also among the unranked portion outside the top ten in the 2020 Prospect list of the top 50 thinkers for the COVID-19 era. In 2025, she was an H.L.A. Hart Visiting Fellow at the University of Oxford.

== Philosophical work ==
Anderson's research covers topics in social philosophy, political philosophy and ethics, including: democratic theory, equality in political philosophy and American law, racial integration, the ethical limits of markets, theories of value and rational choice (alternatives to consequentialism and economic theories of rational choice), the philosophies of John Stuart Mill and John Dewey, and feminist epistemology and philosophy of science.

Anderson's most cited work is her article in Ethics journal, titled "What is the Point of Equality?" Within the article, she harshly criticises luck egalitarianism: a contemporaneously popular view espoused by writers such as Ronald Dworkin. She advocates for a more relational understanding of equality founded upon democratic principles.

Anderson's book The Imperative of Integration was winner of the American Philosophical Association's 2011 Joseph B. Gittler Award, for "an outstanding scholarly contribution in the field of the philosophy of one or more of the social sciences." She is also author of Value in Ethics and Economics, and dozens of articles.

=== Work ethic ===
In a variety of lectures and publications, Anderson has explored the work ethic in terms of its origins and continued influence on culture. Much of her work focuses on American culture and history, but is broadly influenced by, and applicable to European countries which prominently feature shareholder capitalism. Anderson reiterates Max Weber (in his 1905 "The Protestant Ethic and the Spirit of Capitalism") who points to the Protestants, most prominently Richard Baxter, as being the originators of the work ethic. Calvinists believed that to enter heaven and become a saint, one must have faith. Baxter argued that there is no way to know by simple self reflection whether one has faith or not. Instead, one must look to action, specifically a person's work ethic. Laziness and sloth were seen as evidence of declining faith. In his The Saints Everlasting Rest (1650), Baxter set out the core tenets of the Protestant work ethic. Many formative puritan thinkers, such as Robert Sanderson, saw workers as doing their duty to God and promoted distinctly pro-worker values.

Eventually, these Protestant values became secularized by the classical liberals, such as Adam Smith, Thomas Paine, and John Stuart Mill; however, Anderson posits that two flavors of thought on the work ethic emerged: a conservative, pro-capital version as well as a progressive, pro-worker version. She argues that this was the result of the industrial revolution which split up craftspeople into a capital owning class and an immiserated working-class, or what is considered the precariat in the 21st century. She sees two versions of the work ethic: the progressive interpretations favored by workers, and the conservatives interpretation favored by capital owners.

Anderson goes on to argue that many of the neoliberal arguments are largely rooted in the works of Thomas Robert Malthus and Jeremy Bentham, and not the actual classical liberals. Malthus espoused stringent individual responsibility, arguing that people were poor because of their own laziness, promiscuity, and vices. Bentham originated the notion that private capitalists would be able to create more efficient delivery of services than the state could. In contrast, the classical liberals were distinctly more pro-worker, and inconsistent with modern-day conservatives' neoliberal values. Anderson argues there was a reversal in which capital owners reversed the ire away from the idle rich, onto the poor instead; however, in doing so, many of these ideas became contradictory. Anderson provides multiple examples: while conservatives argue against welfare because supposedly handouts cannot bring happiness, this argument is not used against the passive receipt of dividends. The idea of individual responsibility is often cited as a reason to not help debtors but is rarely leveled against creditors for having issued risky loans, or having already charged a risk premium. Anti-monopoly sentiments are often levied against unions but not against IP protection laws, nor the deconstruction of antitrust laws.

== Personal life ==
Anderson is married to David R. Jacobi, a medical doctor practicing in Detroit, Michigan. The couple have two children.

== Bibliography ==
=== Books ===
- Anderson, Elizabeth (1993). Value in ethics and economics. Cambridge, Massachusetts: Harvard University Press. ISBN 9780674931909.
- Anderson, Elizabeth (2013). Imperative of integration. S.l: Princeton Univ Press. ISBN 9780691158112.
- Anderson, Elizabeth; Maitra, Ishani (2013). Law & philosophy. Dubuque, IA: Kendall Hunt Publishing Co. ISBN 9781465229335.
- Anderson, Elizabeth (2017). Private Government: How Employers Rule Our Lives (and Why We Don't Talk about It). Princeton, NJ: Princeton University Press. ISBN 9780691176512.
- Anderson, Elizabeth (2023). Hijacked: How Neoliberalism Turned the Work Ethic against Workers and How Workers Can Take It Back. Cambridge, UK: Cambridge University Press. ISBN 9781009275439.

=== Chapters in books ===
- Anderson, Elizabeth S. (2000). "Contribution". In Kleindienst, Thérèse (ed.). Le livre et l'art: études offertes en hommage à Pierre Lelièvre. Villeurbanne Paris: Presses de l'Enssib Somogy. ISBN 9782850564055.
- Anderson, Elizabeth S. (2005). "Feminist epistemology: an interpretation and a defense". In Cudd, Ann E.; Andreasen, Robin O. (eds.). Feminist theory: a philosophical anthology. Oxford, UK Malden, Massachusetts: Blackwell Publishing. pp. 188–209. ISBN 9781405116619.
- Anderson, Elizabeth S. (2010). "Justifying the capabilities approach to justice". In Robeyns, Ingrid; Brighouse, Harry (eds.). Measuring justice: primary goods and capabilities. Cambridge England New York: Cambridge University Press. pp. 81–100. ISBN 9780521711470.
- Anderson, Elizabeth S. (2018). "Dewey's Moral Philosophy". In Zalta, Edward N. (ed.). The Stanford Encyclopedia of Philosophy (Winter 2019 ed.). Metaphysics Research Lab, Stanford University.
- Anderson, Elizabeth S. (2020). "Feminist epistemology and philosophy of science". In Zalta, Edward N. (ed.). The Stanford Encyclopedia of Philosophy (Spring 2020 ed.). Metaphysics Research Lab, Stanford University.

=== Selected journal articles ===
- Anderson, Elizabeth (Winter 1988). "Values, risks, and market norms". Philosophy and Public Affairs. 17 (1): 54–65. JSTOR 2265286.
- Anderson, E. S. (Winter 1990). "Is women's labor a commodity?". Philosophy and Public Affairs. 19 (1): 71–92. JSTOR 2265363. PMID 11651966.
- Anderson, Elizabeth (October 1990). "The ethical limitations of the market". Economics and Philosophy. 6 (2): 179–205. doi:10.1017/S0266267100001218. S2CID 154998298.
- Anderson, Elizabeth S. (October 1991). "John Stuart Mill and experiments in living". Ethics. 101 (1): 4–26. doi:10.1086/293367. JSTOR 2381719. S2CID 170339697.
- Anderson, Elizabeth (August 1995). "Feminist epistemology: an interpretation and a defense". Hypatia. 10 (3): 50–84. doi:10.1111/j.1527-2001.1995.tb00737.x. S2CID 144518287.
- Anderson, Elizabeth S. (Summer 1995). "The democratic university: the role of justice in the production of knowledge". Social Philosophy and Policy. 12 (2): 186–219. doi:10.1017/S0265052500004726. S2CID 145235245.
- Anderson, Elizabeth (Fall 1995). "Knowledge, human interests, and objectivity in feminist epistemology". Philosophical Topics. 23 (2): 27–58. doi:10.5840/philtopics199523213.
- Anderson, Elizabeth S. (January 1999). "What is the point of equality?". Ethics. 109 (2): 287–337. doi:10.1086/233897. JSTOR 10.1086/233897. S2CID 144596596.
- Anderson, Elizabeth (April 2001). "Symposium on Amartya Sen's philosophy: unstrapping the straitjacket of 'preference': a comment on Amartya Sen's contributions to philosophy and economics". Economics and Philosophy. 17 (1): 21–38. doi:10.1017/S0266267101000128. S2CID 14843477.
- "Integration, affirmative action, and strict scrutiny" (PDF). New York University Law Review. 77: 1195–1271. November 2002. Archived from the original (PDF) on April 2, 2015.
- Anderson, Elizabeth (2003). "Sen, ethics, and democracy". Feminist Economics. 9 (2–3): 239–261. doi:10.1080/1354570022000077953. S2CID 144583041.
- Anderson, Elizabeth (July 2007). "Fair opportunity in education: a democratic equality perspective". Ethics. 117 (4): 595–622. doi:10.1086/518806. JSTOR 10.1086/518806. S2CID 170840479.
- Anderson, Elizabeth (2012). "Epistemic justice as a virtue of social institutions". Social Epistemology. 26 (2): 163–173. doi:10.1080/02691728.2011.652211. S2CID 145350986.
