= Séverine Deneulin =

- Born: Séverine Marie Paule Deneulin; 15 January 1974 (age 52)

Education
- Education: University of Oxford

Philosophical work
- School: Capability approach
- Institutions: University of Bath; Human Development and Capability Association (HDCA)
- Main interests: International development
- Website: www.bath.ac.uk/sps/staff/severine-deneulin/

Séverine Marie Paule Deneulin (born 15 January 1974) is a Belgian senior lecturer in International Development at the Department of Social and Policy Sciences, University of Bath, and a fellow of the Human Development and Capability Association (HDCA); she is also the HDCA's secretary with a place on the executive council.

Deneulin's main areas of research are in development issues and Amartya Sen's capability approach. She is the author of a number of articles and books on the subject including, Wellbeing, justice and development ethics as part of Routledge's human development and capability debates series.

== Education ==
Deneulin gained her MSc in economics from the University of Louvain, Belgium and a DPhil in Development Studies from the University of Oxford.

== Bibliography ==
=== Books ===
- Deneulin, Séverine (2006). Transforming unjust structures the capability approach. Dordrecht, the Netherlands: Springer. ISBN 9781402044311.
- Deneulin, Séverine; Nebel, Mathias; Sagovsky, Nicholas (2006). Transforming unjust structures the capability approach. Dordrecht, the Netherlands: Springer. ISBN 9781402044311.
- Deneulin, Séverine (author and editor); Shahani, Lila (editor) (2006). The capability approach and the praxis of development. Houndmills, Hampshire New York: Palgrave Macmillan. ISBN 9781403999337.
- Deneulin, Séverine; Bano, Masooda (2009). Religion in development: rewriting the secular script. London New York: Zed Books. ISBN 9781848130012.
- Deneulin, Séverine; Shahani, Lila (2009). An introduction to the human development and capability approach freedom and agency. Sterling, Virginia Ottawa, Ontario: Earthscan International Development Research Centre. ISBN 9781844078066. Pdf. E-book.
- Deneulin, Séverine (2014). Wellbeing, justice and development ethics. London New York: Routledge (Human Development and Capability Debates Series). ISBN 9780415720243.

=== Chapters in books ===
- Deneulin, Séverine; Alkire, Sabina (2002), "Individual motivation, its nature, determinants and consequences for within-group behaviour", in Heyer, Judith; Stewart, Frances; Thorp, Rosemary (eds.), Group behaviour and development: is the market destroying cooperation, Oxford New York: Oxford University Press, pp. 51–73, ISBN 9780199256921
- Deneulin, Séverine (2006), ""Necessary thickening": Ricoeur's ethic of justice as a complement to Sen's capability approach", in Deneulin, Séverine; Nebel, Mathias; Sagovsky, Nicholas (eds.), Transforming unjust structures: the capability approach, Dordrecht, the Netherlands: Springer, pp. 27–45, ISBN 9781402044328
- Deneulin, Séverine (2008), "Beyond individual freedom and agency: structures of living together in Sen's capability approach to development", in Alkire, Sabina; Comim, Flavio; Qizilbash, Mozaffar (eds.), The capability approach: concepts, measures and applications, Cambridge: Cambridge University Press, pp. 105–124, ISBN 9780521154529
- Deneulin, Séverine; Shahani, Lila (2009), "Introduction", in Deneulin, Séverine; Shahani, Lila (eds.), An introduction to the human development and capability approach freedom and agency, Sterling, Virginia Ottawa, Ontario: Earthscan International Development Research Centre, pp. xvii–xxi, ISBN 9781844078066
- Deneulin, Séverine; Alkire, Sabina (2009), "A normative framework for development", in Deneulin, Séverine; Shahani, Lila (eds.), An introduction to the human development and capability approach freedom and agency, Sterling, Virginia Ottawa, Ontario: Earthscan International Development Research Centre, pp. 3–21, ISBN 9781844078066
- Deneulin, Séverine; Alkire, Sabina (2009), "The human development and capability approach", in Deneulin, Séverine; Shahani, Lila (eds.), An introduction to the human development and capability approach freedom and agency, Sterling, Virginia Ottawa, Ontario: Earthscan International Development Research Centre, pp. 22–48, ISBN 9781844078066
- Deneulin, Séverine (2009), "Ideas related to human development", in Deneulin, Séverine; Shahani, Lila (eds.), An introduction to the human development and capability approach freedom and agency, Sterling, Virginia Ottawa, Ontario: Earthscan International Development Research Centre, pp. 49–70, ISBN 9781844078066
- Deneulin, Séverine (2009), "Democracy and political participation", in Deneulin, Séverine; Shahani, Lila (eds.), An introduction to the human development and capability approach freedom and agency, Sterling, Virginia Ottawa, Ontario: Earthscan International Development Research Centre, pp. 185–206, ISBN 9781844078066
- Deneulin, Séverine; White, Sarah (2009), "Culture and religion", in Deneulin, Séverine; Shahani, Lila (eds.), An introduction to the human development and capability approach freedom and agency, Sterling, Virginia Ottawa, Ontario: Earthscan International Development Research Centre, pp. 246–272, ISBN 9781844078066
- Deneulin, Séverine; Spence, Randy (2009), "Human development policy analysis", in Deneulin, Séverine; Shahani, Lila (eds.), An introduction to the human development and capability approach freedom and agency, Sterling, Virginia Ottawa, Ontario: Earthscan International Development Research Centre, pp. 275–299, ISBN 9781844078066
- Deneulin, Séverine; Shahani, Lila (2009), "Policy case studies", in Deneulin, Séverine; Shahani, Lila (eds.), An introduction to the human development and capability approach freedom and agency, Sterling, Virginia Ottawa, Ontario: Earthscan International Development Research Centre, pp. 300–333, ISBN 9781844078066
- Deneulin, Séverine (2011), "Advancing human development: values, groups, power and conflict", in Fitzgerald, Valpy; Thorp, Rosemary; Heyer, Judith (eds.), Overcoming the persistence of inequality and poverty, Houndsmill, Basingstoke, Hampshire New York: Palgrave, pp. 127–148, ISBN 9780230249707
- Deneulin, Séverine (2013), "Christianity and international development", in Clarke, Matthew (ed.), Handbook of research on development and religion, Cheltenham, UK: Edward Elgar, pp. 51–65, ISBN 9781782540236
- Deneulin, Séverine (2014), "Constructing new policy narratives: the capability approach as normative language", in Stewart, Frances; Cornia, Giovanni A. (eds.), Towards human development new approaches to macroeconomics and inequality, Oxford, Oxfordshire: Oxford University Press, pp. 45–65, ISBN 9780198706083

=== Journal articles ===
- Deneulin, Séverine (2002). "Perfectionism, liberalism and paternalism in Sen and Nussbaum's capability approach" (PDF). Review of Political Economy. 14 (4). Taylor and Francis: 497–518. doi:10.1080/0953825022000009924. S2CID 38008284.
- Deneulin, Séverine; Stewart, Frances (June 2002). "Amartya Sen's contribution to development thinking" (PDF). Studies in Comparative International Development. 37 (2). Springer: 61–70. doi:10.1007/BF02686262. S2CID 154800212.
- Deneulin, Séverine (2005). "Promoting human freedoms under conditions of inequalities: a procedural framework" (PDF). Journal of Human Development and Capabilities. 6 (1). Taylor and Francis: 75–92. doi:10.1080/146498805200034257. S2CID 55920096.
- Deneulin, Séverine (2005). "Development as freedom and the Costa Rican human development story". Oxford Development Studies. 33 (3–4). Taylor and Francis: 493–510. doi:10.1080/13600810500199327. S2CID 143487608.
- Deneulin, Séverine; Sweeney, James (2006). "Faith's public role: politics and theology". Political Theology. 7 (3). Maney Publishing via Metapress: 261–263. doi:10.1558/poth.2006.7.3.261. S2CID 144803922.
- Deneulin, Séverine (2006). "Secularism and the public-private divide: a response to David Lehmann". Political Theology. 7 (3). Maney Publishing via Metapress: 295–298. doi:10.1558/poth.2006.7.3.295. S2CID 143672462.

Secularism and the public-private divide: a response to David Lehmann was a response to this article: Lehmann, David (2006). "Secularism and the public-private divide: Europe can learn from Latin America". Political Theology. 7 (3). Maney Publishing via Metapress: 273–293. doi:10.1558/poth.2006.7.3.273. S2CID 143729929.

- Deneulin, Séverine (2006). "Individual well-being, migration remittances and the common good". European Journal of Development Research. 18 (1). Palgrave Macmillan: 45–61. doi:10.1080/09578810600572353. S2CID 143720422.
- Deneulin, Séverine; Townsend, Nicholas (2007). "Public goods, global public goods and the common good" (PDF). International Journal of Social Economics. 34 (1–2). Emerald Insight: 19–36. doi:10.1108/03068290710723345.
- Deneulin, Séverine; de Herdt, Tom (2007). "Guest editors' introduction". Journal of Human Development and Capabilities. 8 (2). Taylor and Francis: 179–184. doi:10.1080/14649880701370960. S2CID 141851838.
- Deneulin, Séverine; Hodgett, Susan (March 2009). "On the use of narratives for assessing development policy". Public Administration. 87 (1). Wiley: 65–79. doi:10.1111/j.1467-9299.2008.01742.x.
- Deneulin, Séverine (2009). "Intellectual roots of Amartya Sen: Aristotle, Adam Smith and Karl Marx - book review". Journal of Human Development and Capabilities. 10 (2). Taylor and Francis: 305–306. doi:10.1080/19452820902941628. S2CID 216114489.
- Deneulin, Séverine (2010). "Book review: Michael Sandel's Justice and Amartya Sen's Idea of Justice" (PDF). Oxford Development Studies. 38 (3). Taylor and Francis: 383–388. doi:10.1080/13600818.2010.505726. S2CID 140417487.
- Deneulin, Séverine; McGregor, J. Allister (2010). "The capability approach and the politics of a social conception of wellbeing" (PDF). European Journal of Social Theory. 13 (4). Sage: 501–519. doi:10.1177/1368431010382762. S2CID 56301291. Pdf version.
- Deneulin, Séverine; Devine, Joe (2011). "Negotiating religion in everyday life: A critical exploration of the relationship between religion, choices and behaviour" (PDF). Culture and Religion. 12 (1): 59–76. doi:10.1080/14755610.2011.557014. S2CID 49364983.
- Deneulin, Séverine (2011). "Development and the limits of Amartya Sen's The Idea of Justice" (PDF). Third World Quarterly. 32 (4). Taylor and Francis: 787–797. doi:10.1080/01436597.2011.567008. S2CID 59324754.
- Deneulin, Séverine; Rakodi, Carole (January 2011). "Revisiting religion: development studies thirty years on" (PDF). World Development. 39 (1). Elsevier: 45–54. doi:10.1016/j.worlddev.2010.05.007.
- Deneulin, Séverine; Dinerstein, Ana C. (March 2012). "Hope movements: naming mobilization in a post-development world" (PDF). Development and Change. 43 (2). Wiley: 585–602. doi:10.1111/j.1467-7660.2012.01765.x.
- Deneulin, Séverine (2013). "Recovering Nussbaum's Aristotelian roots" (PDF). International Journal of Social Economics. 40 (7). Emerald Insight: 624–632. doi:10.1108/IJSE-2012-0127.
- Deneulin, Séverine (March 2013). "Ethics and development: an introduction from the perspective of the capability approach". Geography Compass. 7 (3). Wiley: 217–227. Bibcode:2013GComp...7..217D. doi:10.1111/gec3.12029.

=== Papers ===
- Deneulin, Séverine; McGregor, J. Allister (2009). The capability approach and the politics of a social conception of wellbeing (working paper). Bath, UK: University of Bath/Wellbeing in Developing Countries (WeD) Research Group. Pdf version.
- Deneulin, Séverine (2009). Advancing human development: values, groups, power and conflict (working paper). Bath, UK: University of Bath/Wellbeing in Developing Countries (WeD) Research Group. Pdf version.
- Deneulin, Séverine; Brown, Graham; Devine, Joe (August 2009). Contesting the boundaries of religion in social mobilization. Bath, UK: Bath Papers in International Development, Bath: Centre for Development Studies. OCLC 690257625. Pdf version.
- Deneulin, Séverine (2010). Human flourishing and the UK economic model (briefing paper 3). Bath, UK: CAFOD, Tearfund and Theos - Human Flourishing Project, Bath: Centre for Development Studies. OCLC 826511833. Pdf version.
- Deneulin, Séverine; Dinerstein, Ana C. (2010). Hope movements: social movements in the pursuit of human development. Bath, UK: Bath Papers in International Development, Bath: Centre for Development Studies. OCLC 690276461. Pdf version.
- Deneulin, Séverine (2010). Development and the limits of Amartya Sen's The Idea of Justice. Bath, UK: Bath Papers in International Development, Bath: Centre for Development Studies. OCLC 808404636. Pdf version.
- Deneulin, Séverine (2012). Justice and deliberation about the good life: the contribution of Latin American buen vivir social movements to the idea of justice. Bath, UK: Bath Papers in International Development, Bath: Centre for Development Studies. OCLC 826513212. Pdf version.

== See also ==
- Feminist economics
- List of feminist economists
