= Henry S. Richardson =

American philosopher (born 1955)

- Born: Henry Shattuck Richardson; 1955 (age 70–71)
- Spouse: Mary E. Challinor

Education
- Education: Harvard University (BA, JD, MPP, PhD)
- Thesis: Rational deliberation of ends (1986)
- Doctoral advisor: John Rawls

Philosophical work
- Era: Contemporary philosophy
- Region: Western philosophy
- School: Analytic
- Institutions: Georgetown University
- Main interests: Practical reasoning, moral reasoning, bioethics

Henry Shattuck Richardson (born 1955) is an American philosopher, author, and professor of philosophy at Georgetown University, where he is also a senior research scholar at the Kennedy Institute of Ethics.

== Early life and education ==
Richardson is the son of Anne Richardson, who was once the chair of Reading is Fundamental, and the politician and lawyer Elliot Richardson, who served as United States Secretary of Defense, Attorney General, and Secretary of Commerce.

Richardson graduated magna cum laude from Harvard University with a Bachelor of Arts degree in 1977. He then received a J.D. from Harvard Law School and an M.P.P. from the John F. Kennedy School of Government (supervised by Martha Nussbaum), both in 1981. In 1986, Richardson received his Ph.D. in Philosophy from Harvard University under the supervision of John Rawls; his thesis was titled Rational deliberation of ends.

== Academic career ==
Richardson's main work has centred on practical reasoning. His first book, Practical Reasoning about Final Ends, focused on individual reasoning, whilst his second book, Democratic Autonomy: Public Reasoning about the Ends of Policy, which won the Herbert A. Simon Best Book Award in Public Administration, and the David Easton Award in the Foundations of Political Theory, dealt with collective reasoning.

In addition to working on practical reasoning and moral and political philosophy, Richardson has written on bioethics. He has twice been a visiting scholar at the Department of Bioethics at the (U.S.) National Institutes of Health.

From 2008 to 2018, he was the Editor of the academic journal Ethics. From 2010 to 2013, through his work as a member of the World Commission on the Ethics of Scientific Knowledge and Technology (COMEST), he has acted as an advisor to the Director General of UNESCO on ethical issues relating to science and technology.

In September 2014 Richardson began a two-year tenure as president of the Human Development and Capability Association (HDCA). He was succeeded by the economist Ravi Kanbur. From 2014 to 2017, he served as one of two "coordinating lead authors" on the orienting normative chapter of the three-volume report of the International Panel of Social Progress, Rethinking Society for the 21st Century.

In 2019, Richardson was awarded a Guggenheim Fellowship.

== Works ==
=== Books ===
- Richardson, Henry S; Douglass, Bruce; Mara, Gerald M (1990). Liberalism and the good. New York: Routledge. ISBN 9780415902434.
- Richardson, Henry S (1997). Practical reasoning about final ends. Cambridge New York: Cambridge University Press. ISBN 9780521574426.
- Richardson, Henry S (2002). Democratic autonomy: public reasoning about the ends of policy. New York: Oxford University Press. ISBN 9780195150919.
- Richardson, Henry S (2012). Moral entanglements: the ancillary-care obligations of medical researchers. Oxford: Oxford University Press. ISBN 9780195388930.
- Richardson, Henry S (2018). Articulating the moral community: toward a constructive ethical pragmatism. New York: Oxford University Press. ISBN 9780190247744.

=== Journal articles ===
- Richardson, Henry S (Autumn 1990). "Specifying Norms as a way to resolve concrete ethical problems". Philosophy & Public Affairs. 19 (4): 279–310. JSTOR 2265316.
- Richardson, Henry S (1998). "Truth and ends in Dewey". Canadian Journal of Philosophy. 28 (Supplement 1): 109–147. doi:10.1080/00455091.1998.10717497.
- Richardson, Henry S (Summer 1999). "Institutionally divided moral responsibility". Social Philosophy and Policy. 16 (2): 218–249. doi:10.1017/S0265052500002454. S2CID 144573121.
- Richardson, Henry S (2000). "Some limitations of Nussbaum's capacities". The Quinnipiac Law Review. 19 (2): 309–332.
- Richardson, Henry S (June 2000). "The stupidity of the cost-benefit standard". The Journal of Legal Studies. 29 (s2): 971–1003. doi:10.1086/468102. JSTOR 10.1086/468102. S2CID 153426905.
- Richardson, Henry S (June 2006). "Republicanism and democratic injustice". Philosophy, Politics, and Economics. 5 (2): 175–200. doi:10.1177/1470594X06064221. S2CID 154556279.
- Richardson, Henry S (December 2006). "Disabilities, capabilities, and Rawlsian social contract theory". The Journal of Ethics. 10 (4): 419–462. doi:10.1007/s10892-006-9000-5. S2CID 146446421.

Educational offices
Preceded by Tony Atkinson	President of the Human Development and Capability Association; September 2014 – September 2016	Succeeded by Ravi Kanbur from September 2016
