= The Imperative of Integration =

2010 book by Elizabeth S. Anderson

- Cover
- Author: Elizabeth S. Anderson
- Language: English
- Subject: Racial integration, racial segregation, systematic racism, civil rights, affirmative action, housing integration policies
- Genre: Non-fiction
- Publisher: Princeton University Press
- Publication date: Sep 7, 2010
- Publication place: United States
- Media type: Digital (2010), paperback (2013)
- Pages: 264
- ISBN: 9781400836826
- Preceded by: Value in Ethics and Economics (1993)
- Followed by: Private Government: How Employers Rule our Lives (And Why We Don’t Talk About It) (2017)

The Imperative of Integration is a 2010 book by American philosopher Elizabeth Anderson, published by Princeton University Press. Blending empirical social science with political philosophy, the book argues for racial integration as a moral and democratic necessity to address systemic racial inequality in the United States. Anderson critiques segregation as a root cause of racial disparities in economic opportunity, social capital, and civic equality, proposing integration as a transformative ideal that promotes justice and enriches democracy. The book engages with debates on affirmative action, multiculturalism, and the limitations of colorblind ideologies.

== Summary ==
The book studies the role of racial integration in addressing systemic racial inequalities in the United States. The author begins with an empirical analysis of segregation, which she identifies as the central cause of racial inequality. Drawing from social science literature, she demonstrates how segregation impacts access to resources, perpetuates stereotypes, and undermines democracy by fostering social hierarchies and unequal intergroup relations.

In subsequent chapters, Anderson critiques conservative views that attribute inequality to cultural pathology within marginalized groups and challenges the left's multiculturalist emphasis on racial identity over integration. She argues that neither colorblind policies nor multiculturalism sufficiently address the persistent effects of segregation. Instead, she advocates for an integrationist approach that combines democratic ideals with empirical evidence, promoting policies such as housing integration, (Note: Housing integration is a policy aimed at promoting diverse, inclusive communities by ensuring equitable access to housing opportunities regardless of race, ethnicity, or socioeconomic status.) affirmative action, and institutional reforms to dismantle systemic segregation.

The final chapters investigates theoretical and practical considerations, including the psychological and social challenges of integration and the potential benefits for encouraging equality, mutual respect, and robust democratic participation.

== Reception ==
In her review, Magali Bessone, (Note: Of the University of Rennes I) emphasized Anderson's application of her "relational theory of equality" to racial segregation in the United States and praised the book for its pragmatic use of social science. However, she noted that Anderson's method faced challenges when addressing the skepticism of some Black commentators, who saw integration as potentially assimilationist and dismissive of cultural self-determination.

Justo Serrano-Zamora commended the work for its rigorous combination of empirical analysis and normative reflection. He noted Anderson’s use of Charles Tilly’s concept of "durable inequality" and Iris Marion Young’s framework on intergroup oppression.

Danielle Allen said that Anderson convincingly demonstrated segregation as a fundamental cause of inequality, offering integration as a means to restore equality and democracy. .

Michael O. Emerson, of Rice University, described Anderson's work as a synthesis of political philosophy and empirical social science and praised its depth but noted some weaknesses, including what he thought as Anderson’s failure to clearly define key concepts such as "segregation" and "integration."

Benjamin R. Hertzberg said that Anderson persuasively argued for racial integration as a moral and democratic necessity, grounding her claims in extensive evidence. However, Hertzberg critiqued Anderson’s methodological reliance on non-ideal theory, suggesting it underappreciated the role of political ideals in defining social problems.

In her review, Sharon Stanley highlighted Anderson’s revival of racial integration as a central goal for achieving justice and democracy. She praised the author's combination of empirical analysis and theoretical argument.
