= Department of International Development, University of Oxford =

Department of Oxford University

Department of International Development
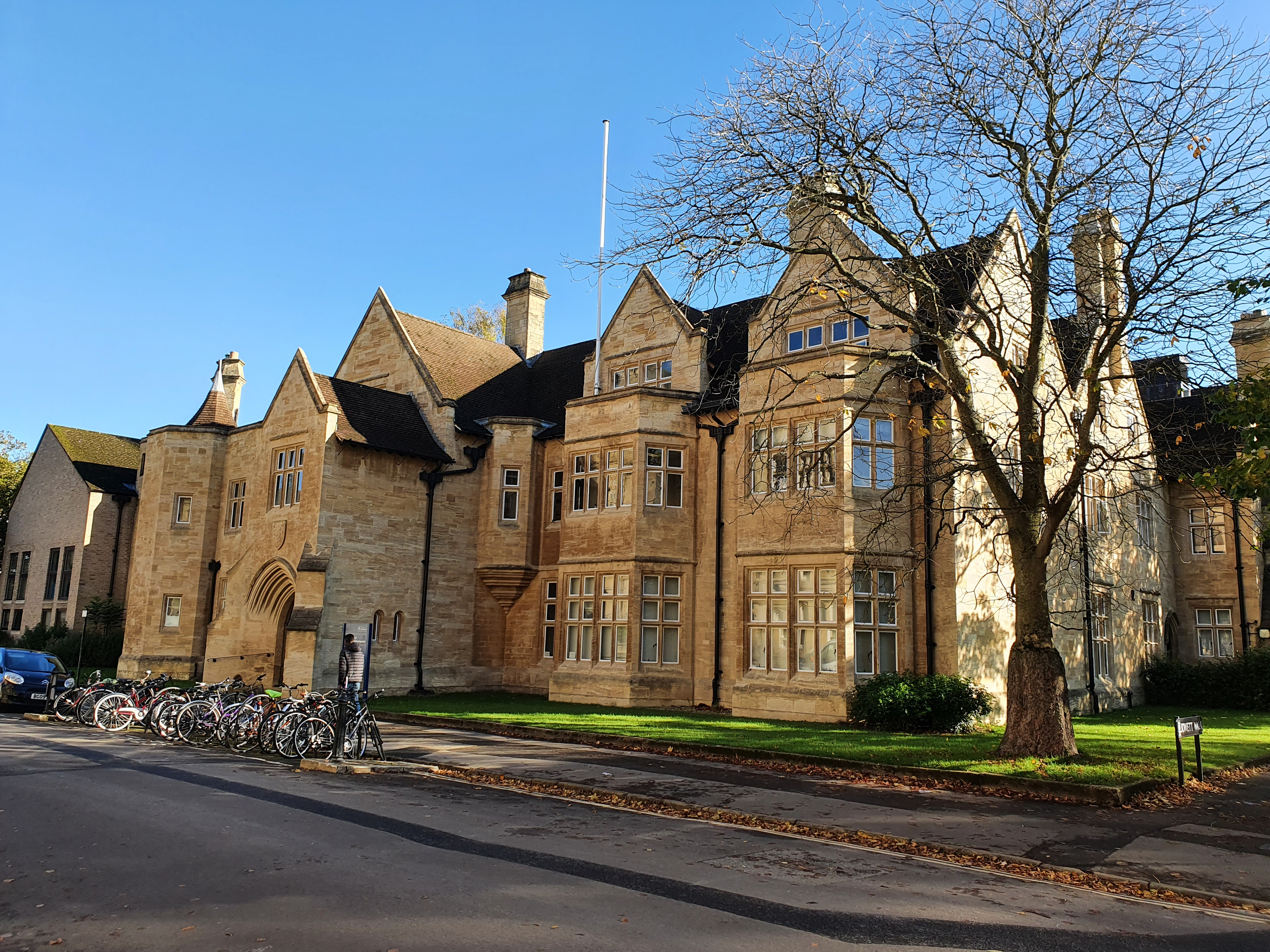
- Established: 1954
- Affiliations: University of Oxford
- Academic staff: 75
- Postgraduates: 200
- Doctoral students: 90
- Location: Oxford, England
- Head of Department: Diego Sanchez Ancochea
- Website: Official website

The Department of International Development, or Queen Elizabeth House (QEH), is an academic department at the Social Sciences Division at the University of Oxford in Oxford, England. It focuses on multidisciplinary research and postgraduate teaching on the developing world.

== Queen Elizabeth House ==
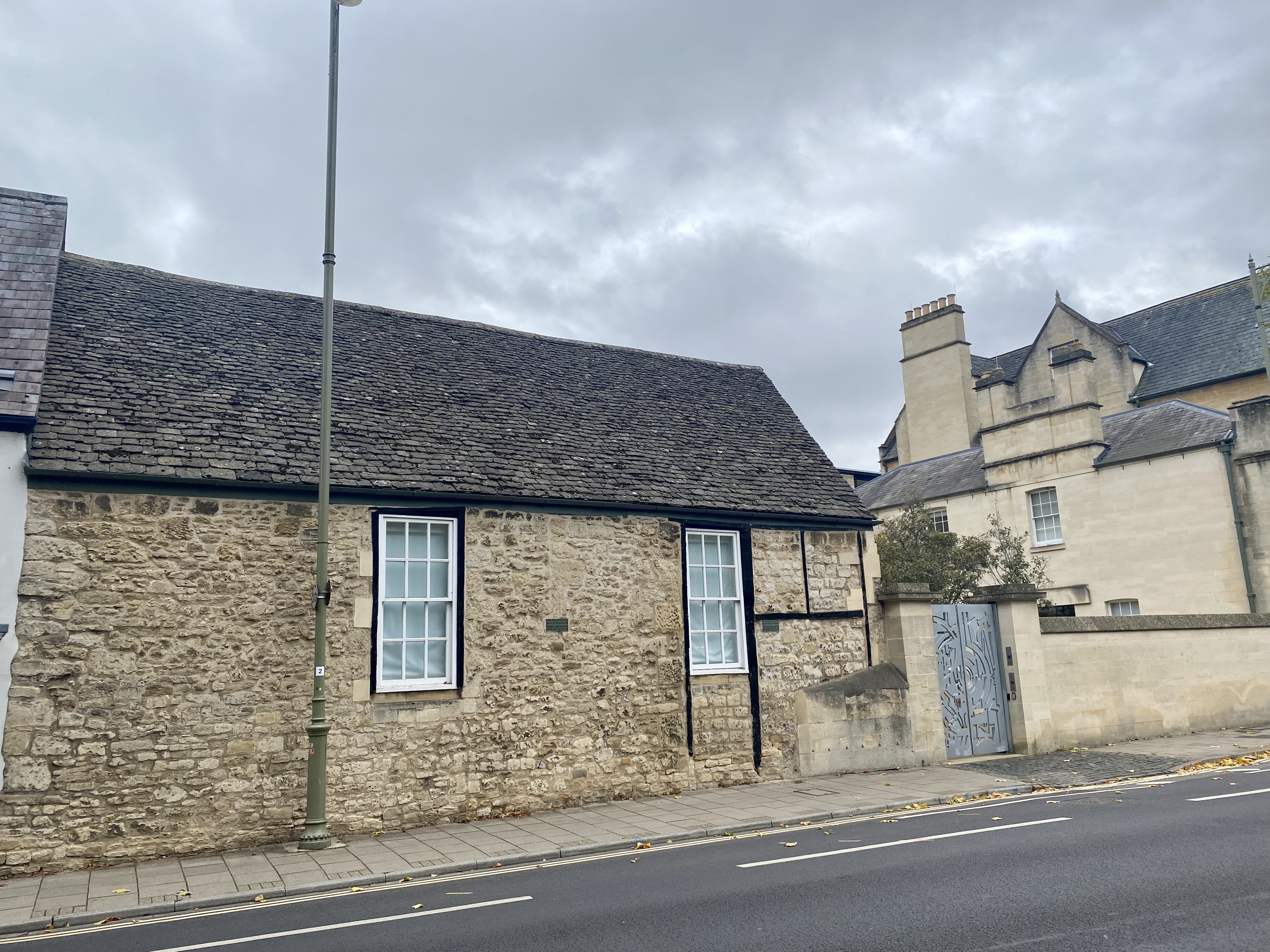
The Queen Elizabeth House site in St Giles, Oxford, including an early rubble-stone barn building

Queen Elizabeth House (QEH) was founded in 1954 as a result of a gift of £100,000 given by Sir Ernest Oppenheimer to the University of Oxford, constituted by Royal Charter.

From 1958 to 2005, QEH was located at 20–21 St Giles in central Oxford. The original QEH site lies north of St John's College, one of the Oxford University colleges. The site includes the earlier 17th-century Black Hall.

In 1961, a new brick-built block was added, designed by R. E. Enthoven. In 1985, QEH merged with the Institute of Commonwealth Studies and the Institute of Agricultural Economics. In 2005, the lease of the site ended and its ownership returned to the nearby St John's College, which meant that the department needed to move its location.

== Later developments ==
In 2005, the department moved to the former School of Geography building in Mansfield Road and became known as the Oxford Department of International Development. In 2011, the department was given royal authorisation to use the name "Queen Elizabeth House" for the buildings at 3 Mansfield Road.

== Notable research groups ==
The department hosts six research groups and major projects including:

- Oxford Poverty and Human Development Initiative (OPHI), led by Prof.Sabina Alkire
- Technology and Industrialisation for Development Centre (TIDE), led by Prof. Xiaolan Fu
- Young Lives, led by Dr. Marta Favara
- Refugee Studies Centre, led by Prof. Matthew Gibney

== Notable people ==
The following people are or have been associated with the department:

- Sabina Alkire
- Alexander Betts
- Xiaolan Fu
- Barbara Harriss-White
- Frances Stewart
