= People-centered development =

Theory of international development

People-centered development is an approach to international development that focuses on improving local communities' self-reliance, social justice, and participatory decision-making. It recognizes that economic growth does not inherently contribute to human development and calls for changes in social, political, and environmental values and practices.

== History ==
In 1984, David Korten, a former regional advisor to the U.S. Agency for International Development (USAID), proposed a people-centered development strategy that incorporated the values of justice, sustainability, and inclusiveness. According to Korten, the prevailing growth-focused development strategy is unsustainable and inequitable. He calls for transformations of our institutions, technology, values, and behavior, "consistent with our ecological and social realities."

Published in 1989, The Manila Declaration on People's Participation and Sustainable Development sets forth principles and guidelines for enacting these transformations.

The concept of people-centered development gained recognition at several international development conferences in the 1990s, such as the Earth Summit in 1992, the International Conference on Population and Development (ICPD) in 1994, and the Summit for Social Development of 1995. The concept was first widely promoted in the United Nations Development Programme's (UNDP) Human Development Report in 1990, in which countries' level of development was measured by the Human Development Index (HDI). The UNDP's report deems economic growth a necessary means to achieving sustainable development.

Japan's Ministry of Foreign Affairs stated in its 1996 official development assistance (ODA) report that the objective of people-centered development is, "helping humankind lead an affluent and happy life." "Shaping the 21st Century", a report published by the Development Assistance Committee (DAC) of the Organisation for Economic Co-operation and Development (OECD) in 1996, made people-centered development a target policy for all member countries. It stressed the importance of local ownership, participation, and capacity building while attaining economic growth.

== Central themes ==
=== Sustainability ===
Sustainability is an inherent component and explicit goal of people-centered development. People-centered development calls for the establishment of self-supporting social and economic systems, key elements of a sustainable society. In addition to its commitment to people-centered development, the DAC High-Level Meeting in May 1996 made sustainability a concrete development goal, requiring the implementation of national sustainability initiatives by 2005 in order to reverse deforestation, water pollution, and other trends of environmental degradation.

The Manila Declaration stated that people-centered development is the only way to achieve sustainable communities. Expanding beyond the environmental scope of sustainability, it advocates small-scale community actions in order to enhance economic self-reliance and create reliable sources of income. It also calls for debt reductions and blames excessive long-term foreign debt financing for the cyclical repayment burdens and policy impositions that inhibit sustainable development.

David Korten claims that people-centered development is the only way to develop sustainable communities. He criticized the common development practice of increased economic output through natural resource depletion. Korten also advocates sustainability in the financing of development projects and the relationships of external assistance. He calls on external development partners to support objectives chosen by the people, building communities' capacity to manage resources and meet local needs independently.

=== Participation ===
In the context of people-centered development, central elements of participation include:

- Democratic processes
- Government accountability
- Access to relevant information
- Gender equality

The OECD noted that democratic processes are essential to people-centered development because they allow communities to create their own development goals and influence the decisions that determine their quality of life. Community participation and true democratic process demand that people have the means to hold government officials and public institutions accountable. It requires that governments act as enablers for the peoples' agenda, creating policies that enhance citizen action.

Communities must have access to relevant, reliable information in order to make the best decisions for themselves and their communities. The Manila Declaration proposed global monitoring systems to increase peoples' access to relevant information in order for communities to make rational decisions and protect their interests.

True democratic processes can only be achieved when men and women are represented equally. People-centered development necessitates equality in the roles of men and women, a systemic problem in many developing nations. The OECD noted several reasons why women are essential to sustainable, people-centered development:

1. the rate of return on female education investment could be higher than that of any other investment,
2. the problems brought by poverty affect women more than other groups,
3. as managers of natural resources, women are key contributors to sustainability

=== Justice ===
In the context of people-centered development, elements of justice include:

- Local ownership
- Equal distrinution of the developmental resources
- Sovereignty of the people & government enablement
- Employment and income generation

The OECD's DAC affirms that the role of external development partners is to enhance developing countries' capacity to meet sustainable development requirements. This strategy emphasizes the need for local ownership so that communities have responsibility and control over their resources in order to benefit themselves and also stresses the role of government as an enabler for the peoples' agenda. According to David Korten, individuals have a greater incentive to pursue sustainable environmental practices when resources are locally owned. In addition, he says that people-centered development "rejects the right of one person to self-enrichment based on the appropriation of the resources on which another person's survival depends."

Japan's Ministry of Foreign Affairs adopted a strategy of people-centered development in 1996, citing the concept's growing centrality at international development conferences. It recognized a primary concern of people-centered development – whether or not the benefits of economic growth (e.g. increased employment and income) are seen in underserved communities. The Manila Declaration proposed reductions in resource exports in order to address this concern. A reduction in exports would allow communities to meet their local needs first. According to Korten, a share of surplus production should then be used to create high value-added products, providing the optimal benefits to developing communities.
