= Socioeconomic impact of female education =

The socioeconomic impact of female education constitutes a significant area of research within international development. Increases in the amount of female education in regions tends to correlate with high levels of development. Some of the effects are related to economic development. Women's education increases the income of women and leads to growth in GDP. Other effects are related to social development. Educating girls leads to a number of social benefits, including many related to women's empowerment.

== Research ==
Recent research in human development has established a strong link between women's education and international development. International development is an academic discipline concerned with the social and economic progress in impoverished regions. In particular, researchers seek to determine what factors explain differences in rates of development. Women's education is one of the major explanatory variables behind the rates of social and economic development, and has been shown to have a positive correlation with both. According to notable economist Lawrence Summers, "investment in the education of girls may well be the highest-return investment available in the developing world." Closing gender disparity is also one of the U.N. Millennium Developmental Goals.

=== Measurement ===
There are multiple ways researchers measure the effects of women's education on development. Typically, studies concern themselves with the gender gap between the education levels of boys and girls and not simply the level of women's education. This helps to distinguish the specific effects of women's education from the benefits of education in general. Note that some studies, particularly older ones, do simply look at women's total education levels. One way to measure education levels is to look at what percentage of each gender graduates from each stage of school. A similar, more exact way is to look at the average number of years of schooling a member of each gender receives. A third approach uses the literacy rates for each gender, as literacy is one of the earliest and primary aims of education. This provides an idea of not just how much education was received but how effective it was.

The most common way to measure economic development is to look at changes in growth of GDP. In order to ensure that a connection holds, correlations are analyzed across different countries over different periods of time. Typically the result given is a relatively steady average effect, although variation over time can also be measured. The benefits of education to an individual can also be analyzed. This is done by first finding the cost of education and the amount of income that would have been earned during years enrolled in school. The difference between the sum of these two quantities and the total increase in income due to education is the net return.

== Effects on economic development ==
Both individuals and countries benefit from women's education. Individuals who invest in education receive a net monetary gain over the course of their lifetime. According to Harry Patrinos, lead education economist at the World Bank, "the profitability of education, according to estimates of private rate of return, is indisputable, universal, and global." The principle holds particularly for women, who can expect a 1.2% higher return than men on the resources they invest in education. Providing one extra year of education to girls increases their wages by 10-20%. This increase is 5% more than the corresponding returns on providing a boy with an extra year of schooling.

This individual monetary gain creates an increase in the overall economic productivity of a country. Girls are underrepresented in schooling, meaning that investments aimed specifically at educating women should produce bigger dividends. Although investment in women's education is not present everywhere, David Dollar and Roberta Gatti have presented findings that show that this decision, along with other failures to invest in women are not "an efficient economic choice for developing countries" and that "countries that under-invest grow more slowly." Looking holistically at the opportunity cost of not investing in girls, the total missed GDP growth is between 1.2% and 1.5%. When looking at different regions, it is estimated that 0.4–0.9% of the difference in GDP growth is accounted for solely by differences in the gender gap in education. The effect of the educational gender gap is more pronounced when a country is only moderately poor. Thus the incentive to invest in women goes up as a country moves out of extreme poverty.

In addition to total economic growth, women's education also increases the equitability of the distribution of wealth in a society. Increased women's education is important for achieving this as it targets the impoverished women, a particularly disadvantaged group. There is also evidence that lower gender disparity in educational attainment for a developing country correlates with lower overall income disparity within society.

== Effects on social development ==
Women's education leads to significant social development. Some of the most notable social benefits include decreased fertility rates and lower infant mortality rates, and lower maternal mortality rates. Closing the gender gap in education also increases gender equality, which is considered important both in itself and because it ensures equal rights and opportunities for people regardless of gender. Women's education has cognitive benefits for women as well. Improved cognitive abilities increase the quality of life for women and also lead to other benefits. One example of this is the fact that educated women are better able to make decisions related to health, both for themselves and their children. Cognitive abilities also translate to increased political participation among women. Educated women are more likely to engage in civic participation and attend political meetings, and there are several instances in which educated women in the developing world were able to secure benefits for themselves through political movements. Evidence also points to an increased likelihood of democratic governance in countries with well-educated women.

There are also benefits relating to the woman's role in the household. Educated women have been found to experience less domestic violence, regardless of other social status indicators like employment status. Women with an education are also more involved in the decision-making process of the family and report making more decisions over a given time period. In particular, these benefits extend to economic decisions. Besides the intrinsic value of increasing a woman's agency, having women play a more active role in the family also brings about social benefits for family members. In a household where the mother is educated, children and especially girls are more likely to attend school. In households where a mother is not educated, adult literacy programs can indirectly help to teach mothers the value of education and encourage them to send their children to school. There are also a number of other benefits for children associated with having an educated mother over an educated father, including higher survival rates and better nutrition.

== Limitations of impact ==
There are some cases in which women's education has less of an effect on development. Economically, the benefits of investing in women are much smaller in areas facing high levels of poverty. Also, in some cases the education women receive is of much lower quality than what men receive, lowering its effectiveness. This phenomenon can be accompanied by the so-called hidden curriculum in schools, where certain values are reinforced. Emphasis on the superiority of boys can cause educated women to pass up economic opportunities in favor of lower-paying traditionally female jobs, with poor economic and social consequences. In other cases, curricula can differ based explicitly on gender. For example, in Saudi Arabia, curriculum differentiation for men and women is backed by government policy that creates differentiated access to fields of study. These policies also promote ideas of stereotypical gender roles by using educational environments and texts to enforce gendered ideas of women's duties to the family above all else, including their own work and education. In primary school, female students study needlework, domestic science, and child welfare while male students study wood and metal crafts. In secondary school, male students are given access to technical and vocational training that female students are not.

There are also situations in which women's education helps development on the macro-scale but is inefficient for a family. For example in Saudi Arabia, the rise in female employment as well as the developments in female education have not had much of an impact on the gender division in the Saudi workforce. The majority of working women in Saudi Arabia work in traditional female occupations for example teaching, medicine, nursing, and social work. This causes the workforce to be segregated and makes it difficult for women graduates to find employment. As a result the country suffers a major problem, which is a high unemployment rate of educated women.In societies where women are married off and leave the family while men stay back and take care of their parents, investing in sons is more valuable to parents. Additionally, while investing in women's education has a higher overall return when looking at all levels of education, through primary school investing in men has a higher rate of return. This gives families who are only planning to send their children to primary school incentives to invest in their sons' education over their daughters' education. Socially, societal gender roles may stifle the ability of women's education to improve gender equality for women. This is particularly the case when education for women is only seen culturally as a tool for making women more attractive wives.

Some researchers don't claim that women's education necessarily has little effect on development, but instead question the methodologies of the research showing that it has a sizable effect. One issue that researchers acknowledge is the difficulty in comparing education levels. The same number of years of schooling in two different countries may have very different educational content. Similarly, what is termed 'primary school' in different countries may vary widely. Also, while extensive information for education in developed countries exists, data is only available for a small number of developing countries. This brings into question to what extent the results can be generalized for all developing countries. Additionally, while the pure economic benefits are relatively uncontroversial, there is some discrepancy over how to measure the social benefits, with some variability between studies.

== Relationship between female education and socioeconomic factors in India ==
Communities throughout India can be used as valuable case studies to illustrate the complex relationship between education and socioeconomic systems. There are many social factors that have prevented women from education throughout India, including traditional conservative thinking, early marriage, child labor, and structural and institutional factors. This can be seen in the gender disparity in literacy throughout the country, as men are 80.9% literate and women are 64.6% literate. While India as a whole seems to prove the theory that a lack of female education is a barrier to economic development, an inside look at education and socioeconomics between states shows a more complex relationship. Comparison of states can also illustrate the complexity in education being both a cause and effect of social and economic factors.

The state with the highest rate of female literacy, at 91.98%, is the southern state of Kerala. 26.9% of female students in Kerala are likely to pursue higher education, while men are less likely at 19.3%. The state's GDP is ranked 11th out of all Indian states. The extremely high female literacy rate, especially when compared to the national rate of female literacy at 65.46%, is attributed to a historical, societal value of women compared to other Indian states. This can be seen in comparative women participation and some autonomy in academia and the arts, playing roles in politics, administration, festivals, and social reform. Women have the power to inherit land and choose their spouse, which provides Kerala with one of the lowest early marriage rates in India. The strongest connection between educational impact on social systems is the low fertility rate in Kerala, achieving "below replacement level fertility two decades ahead of the all-India target year of 2011." Explanations of this connection are speculated to be educated women having more opportunities that demand more time than a woman can handle with more children, and educated women having more knowledge, access, and choice in family planning devices like contraceptives. The state also demonstrates low infant and child mortality rates, the lowest in all of India—a universal indicator of educational impact—as women feel more confident and able in their child's care and is more aware of health practices.

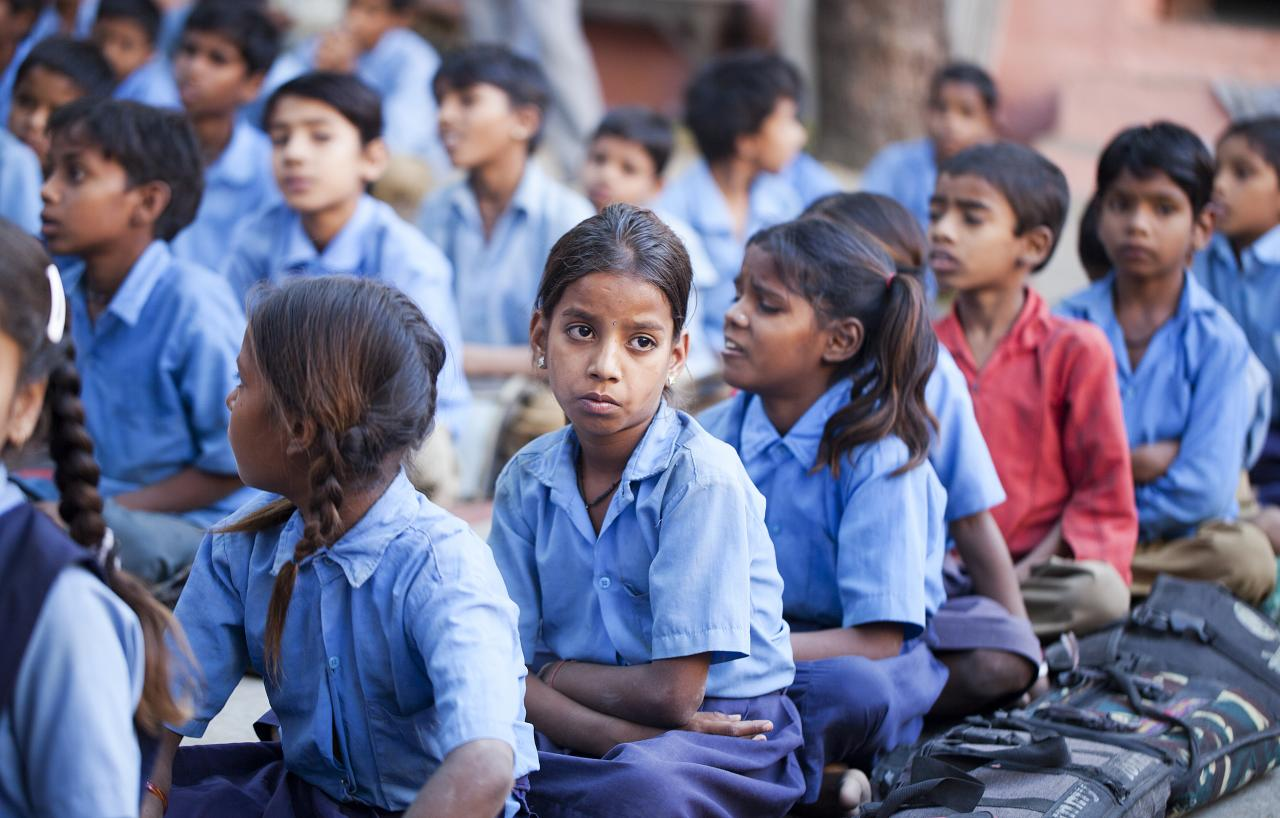
Boys and girls at a Rajasthan school.

The state with the lowest female literacy is the state of Rajasthan, at 52.66%. 20.8% of male students in Rajasthan go on to pursue higher education, while a lesser 14.9% of women seek further education. The complexity in the comparison of Kerala and Rajasthan is seen in the higher ranking of Rajasthan in terms of GDP, ranked 9th highest out of all of the Indian states, with Kerala at 11th. Although Kerala's female literacy rates and female higher education applicants far exceed Rajasthan's, Rajasthan's GDP is ranked higher. This shows regional contradictions in the theory that increases in female education can drive development and exposes the complexity of this discourse. The sex ratio of Rajasthan might hint a lower value placed in females, with 800-900 females per 1000 males, while the sex ratio of Kerala is over 1000 females per males. Female child labor in Rajasthan has led to high student drop outs, especially in the cotton industry, and child marriage is still an issue in-of-itself that leaves females less likely to attend school. Another economic cause of this low literacy is the many children throughout Rajasthan without access to education and communities that don't value education due to poor facilities. Paradoxically, while child labor is the largest contribution to keeping children out of school in Rajasthan, improved access to and condition of educational facilities could in help break the vicious cycle of poverty that is attached to child labor. Societal value of females, ending child labor, and improving educational facilities are keys in Rajasthan's improvement in female and male literacy and poverty rates.

== See also ==
- Capabilities approach
- Feminization of poverty
- Gender equality
- Poverty reduction
- The Girl Effect
