= Limitarianism (ethical) =

Set of ethical theories

- Description: Study and theory of when there could be moral and ethical justifications for placing limits on the Citizenry by the State, in order to yield certain types of social justice.
- Subject: Ethics, economics, law, philosophy, political science

Limitarianism refers to several different types of ethical theories. Though limitarianism applies differently to varied fields of study, what is always common is an examination of when it is proper, moral or ethical to interfere and intervene in the lives and freedoms of individuals, in order to benefit society as a whole. It sometimes presents as a principle of distributive justice in economic theories (economic limitarianism). Unlike encompassing systems of political and economic intervention, which seek to make dramatic changes to the social order, limitarianism deals with specific instances and subjects, for which the necessity and justification of intervention may be examined. As its name implies, limitarianism asks the question of how setting certain limits for human beings can lead to positive outcomes.

The simplest explanation of the most common use of the term is enforcing limits to the maximum amount of wealth a person can accumulate in order to improve society so that it functions for all people instead of for only a select few.

== Early uses of term "limitarianism" ==
The first known use of the term "limitarianism" seems to have been in early Christianity. Christian theological limitarianism teaches that Christ's atonement applies only to the elect (as Calvinism), and not to all humanity (as Christian universalism taught), or of limited atonement and irresistible grace as St. Augustine had taught.

== Types of limitarianism in philosophy, political science, and economics ==
=== Ethical limitarianism ===
Ethical limitarianism is an ethical theory which (1) tries to be a partial account of distributive justice, (2) belongs within the realms of politics rather than morality, (3) is conceived and developed at the level of non-ideal theory, and (4) relies on an instrumental justification.

=== Democratic limitarianism ===
Democratic limitarianism is a political theory which posits that governments have priority duties to their citizenry to protect it from risk and to ensure independence from fear. Based on such ideas, this political philosophy urges that governments should prioritize protecting the citizens against fear of death or injury from:

- Domestic threats
- Foreign threats
- Social insecurity
- Environmental hazard

There exists a political movement which advocates for such ideas through principles of prioritization.

=== Economic limitarianism ===
Economic limitarianism is a school of thought in economics which asserts that social improvement can be attained by the placement of a certain limit on personal wealth. Different modalities have been proposed for the regulation of such a limit. Economic limitarianism differs from socialism in that it does not negate the idea of private property, nor completely bar the accumulation of wealth. It rather sets to determine and enforce a limit on the accumulation thereof, as means of creating a positive change in the economic system of a nation.

The philosopher Ingrid Robeyns has promoted a form of economic limitarianism which proposes a system of social justice via wealth distribution, which bears some similarities to social democracy and socialism. Robeyn's idea of economic limitarianism states that it is morally impermissible to be excessively rich (i.e., have more economic resources than a certain level). The ethical-economic limitarianism of Robeyns would contrast with this view of democratic limitarianism. In 2016, the European Research Council awarded Robeyns a grant of 2 million Euros for conducting a 5-year research study on limitarianism.

== Response and criticism ==
In the year 2021, two articles were published in the Penn Journal of Philosophy Politics and Economics, Volume 16, providing academic analysis of economic limitarianism from different points of view. The articles specifically tackled the version of economic limitarianism promoted by Robeyns, and referred to her work.

In the first article of the two, Karl Meyer proposed extending Robeyns' theories by applying them to corporations. Meyer posited that the problems raised by Robeyns with regard to excess of wealth, were not limited to individuals, but rather were also characteristic of corporations. Thus, it was Meyer's opinion that the wealth of corporations should also be subjected to limitarian laws and regulations.

The second article of the two, written by Timothy J. Nicklas, criticizes Robeyns' views. Nicklas addresses two of Robeyns' claims concerning the benefits of economic limitarianism, specifically that: 1. It is possible to determine a wealth limit which objectively encapsulates "what is needed to have a flourishing life", and 2. That limitarianism would improve the democratic process. Nicklas is not convinced that there could be an overarching objective economic measure of people's financial needs to assert a 'good life', a criticism already raised earlier by Bluestein. Nicklas also pointed out, that the striving for political power and the abuse thereof shall continue, even if there had been a limit placed on individual wealth.

== Similar and related modalities ==
=== Sufficientarianism ===
Sufficientarianism is a school of thought in social justice, economics and philosophy, which strives to determine what are the supposed basic needs that should be allotted to human beings in order to guarantee social equity, or at least equality of opportunity. Such questions which are asked by Sufficientarianism, have historically been an integral part of democratic theory and socialist theory, as in both exist the belief that the State has a duty to provide the citizenry with certain "needs" and "rights." Both sufficientarianism and limitarianism revolve around the topics of social equity and equality of opportunity. However, while sufficientarianism deals with questions regarding what people should have or need to be granted, limitarianism examines how to place limits of excess on accumulation of wealth.

== Non-economic limitarianism ==
=== Pollution ===
Ingrid also points out that a limit should be imposed on pollution, and that it would be desirable to establish a cap-and-trade system that also takes ecological factors into account. A similar idea is put forward by Andreas Malm in his book How to Blow Up a Pipeline, in which he argues that we must first tackle the emissions generated by the wealthy—specifically citing private jets as the most common example. However, he notes that SUVs cause far more pollution, despite being much more accessible. In his view, the lifestyles of a much larger number of people would therefore need to be restricted. Nevertheless, for him, private jets remain a priority target and a powerful symbol.

== See also ==
- Economic interventionism
- Ethics in religion
- Humanitarian intervention
- Liberation theology
- Maximum wage
- Rule of rescue
- Virtue ethics
