= Capability approach =

Normative approach to human welfare

The capability approach (also referred to as the capabilities approach) is a normative approach to human welfare that concentrates on the actual capability of persons to achieve lives they value rather than solely having a right or freedom to do so. It was conceived in the 1980s as an alternative approach to welfare economics.

In this approach, Amartya Sen and Martha Nussbaum combine a range of ideas that were previously excluded from (or inadequately formulated in) traditional approaches to welfare economics. The core focus of the capability approach is improving access to the tools people use to live a fulfilling life. Hence, the approach has a strong connection to intragenerational sustainability and sustainability strategies.

== Assessing capability ==
Sen initially argued for five components to assess capability:

1. The importance of real freedoms in the assessment of a person's advantage
2. Individual differences in the ability to transform resources into valuable activities
3. The multi-variate nature of activities giving rise to wellbeing
4. A balance of materialistic and nonmaterialistic factors in evaluating human welfare
5. Concern for the distribution of opportunities within society

Subsequently, in collaboration with political philosopher Martha Nussbaum, development economist Sudhir Anand and economic theorist James Foster, Sen has helped propel the capabilities approach to appear as a policy paradigm in debates concerning human development; his research inspired the creation of the UN's Human Development Index (a popular measure of human development that captures capabilities in health, education, and income). Additionally, the approach has been operationalized to have a high income country focus by Paul Anand and colleagues. Sen also founded the Human Development and Capability Association in 2004 in order to further promote discussion, education, and research on the human development and capability approach. Since then, the approach has been much discussed by political theorists, philosophers, and a range of social scientists, including those with a particular interest in human health.

The approach emphasizes functional capabilities ("substantive freedoms", such as the ability to live to old age, engage in economic transactions, or participate in political activities); these are construed in terms of the substantive freedoms people have reason to value, instead of utility (happiness, desire-fulfillment or choice) or access to resources (income, commodities, assets). An approach to wellbeing using utility can be found in utilitarianism, while access to resources is advocated by the Rawlsian approach.

Poverty is understood as capability-deprivation. It is noteworthy that proponents emphasize not only how humans function, but their access to capabilities "to achieve outcomes that they value and have reason to value". Everyone could be deprived of capabilities in many ways, e.g. by ignorance, government oppression, lack of financial resources, or false consciousness.

This approach to human well-being emphasizes the importance of freedom of choice, individual heterogeneity and the multi-dimensional nature of welfare. In significant respects, the approach is consistent with the handling of choice within conventional microeconomics consumer theory, although its conceptual foundations enable it to acknowledge the existence of claims, like rights, which normatively dominate utility-based claims (see Sen 1979).

== Key terms ==
=== Functionings ===
In the most basic sense, functionings consist of "beings and doings". As a result, living may be seen as a set of interrelated functions. Essentially, functionings are the states and activities constitutive of a person's being. Examples of functionings can vary from elementary things, such as being healthy, having a good job, and being safe, to more complex states, such as being happy, having self-respect, and being calm. Moreover, Amartya Sen contends that functionings are crucial to an adequate understanding of the capability approach; capability is conceptualized as a reflection of the freedom to achieve valuable functionings.

In other words, functionings are the subjects of the capabilities referred to in the approach: what we are capable of, want to be capable of, or should be capable of being and/or do. Therefore, a person's chosen combination of functionings, what they are and do, is part of their overall capability set — the functionings they were able to do. Yet, functionings can also be conceptualized in a way that signifies an individual's capabilities. Eating, starving, and fasting would all be considered functionings, but the functioning of fasting differs significantly from that of starving because fasting, unlike starving, involves a choice and is understood as choosing to fast despite the presence of other options.

=== Capabilities ===
Capabilities are the alternative combinations of functionings that are feasible for a person to achieve. Formulations of capability have two parts: functionings and opportunity freedom — the substantive freedom to pursue different functioning combinations. Ultimately, capabilities denote a person's opportunity and ability to generate valuable outcomes, taking into account relevant personal characteristics and external factors. The important part of this definition is the "freedom to achieve", because if freedom had only instrumental value (valuable as a means to achieve an end) and no intrinsic value (valuable in and of itself) to a person's well-being, then the value of the capability set as a whole would simply be defined by the value of a person's actual combination of functionings. Such a definition would not acknowledge the entirety of what a person is capable of doing and their resulting current state due to the nature of the options available to them. Consequently, the capability set outlined by this approach is not merely concerned with achievements; rather, freedom of choice, in and of itself, is of direct importance to a person's quality of life.

For example, the difference between fasting and starving, on person's well-being, is whether the person is choosing not to eat. In this example, the functioning is starving but the capability to obtain an adequate amount of food is the key element in evaluating well-being between individuals in the two states. In sum, having a lifestyle is not the same as choosing it; well-being depends on how that lifestyle came to be. More formally, while the combination of a person's functionings represents their actual achievements, their capability set represents their opportunity freedom — their freedom to choose between alternative combinations of functionings.

In addition to being the result of capabilities, some functionings are also a prerequisite for capabilities, i.e., there is a dual role of some functionings as both ends and instruments. Examples of functionings that are a direct requirement for capabilities are good nourishment, mental and physical health, and education.

Nussbaum further distinguishes between internal capabilities that are personal abilities, and combined capabilities that are "defined as internal capabilities together with the social/political/economic conditions in which functioning can actually be chosen". She points out that the notion of (combined) capability "combines internal preparedness with external opportunity in a complicated way, so that measurement is likely to be no easy task."

An extension of the capabilities approach was published in 2013 in Freedom, Responsibility and Economics of the Person. This book explores the interconnected concepts of person, responsibility and freedom in economics, moral philosophy and politics. It tries to reconcile the rationality and morality of individuals. It presents a methodological reflection (phenomenology versus Kantian thought) with the aim to re-humanise the person, through actions, and through the values and norms that lead to corresponding rights and obligations that must be ordered. The book extends the capabilities approach in a critical form. In particular, it considers freedom in relation to responsibility, that is, the capacity of people to apply moral constraints to themselves. By contrast, Sen's capability approach considers freedom as a purely functional rationality of choice.

=== Agency ===
Amartya Sen defines an agent as someone who acts and brings about change, whose achievement can be evaluated in terms of his or her own values and goals. This differs from a common use of the term "agent" sometimes used in economics and game theory to mean a person acting on someone else's behalf. Agency depends on the ability to personally choose the functionings one values, a choice that may not correlate with personal well-being. For example, when a person chooses to engage in fasting, they are exercising their ability to pursue a goal they value, though such a choice may not positively affect physical well-being. Sen explains that a person as an agent need not be guided by a pursuit of well-being; agency achievement considers a person's success in terms of their pursuit of the whole of their goals.

For the purposes of the capability approach, agency primarily refers to a person's role as a member of society, with the ability to participate in economic, social, and political actions. Therefore, agency is crucial in assessing one's capabilities and any economic, social, or political barriers to one's achieving substantive freedoms. Concern for agency stresses that participation, public debate, democratic practice, and empowerment, should be fostered alongside well-being.

Alkire and Deneulin pointed out that agency goes together with the expansion of valuable freedoms. That is, in order to be agents of their lives, people need the freedom to be educated, speak in public without fear, express themselves, associate, etc.; conversely, people can establish such an environment by being agents. In summary, the agency aspect is important in assessing what a person can do in line with his or her conception of the good.

== Nussbaum's central capabilities ==
Nussbaum (2000) frames these basic principles in terms of 10 capabilities, i.e. real opportunities based on personal and social circumstance. She claims that a political order can only be considered as being decent if this order secures at least a threshold level of these 10 capabilities to all inhabitants. Nussbaum's capabilities approach is centered around the notion of individual human dignity. Nussbaum emphasizes that this approach is necessary since even individuals within a family unit can have vastly different needs. Given Nussbaum's contention that the goal of the capabilities approach is to produce capabilities for each and every person, the capabilities below belong to individual persons, rather than to groups. The capabilities approach has been very influential in development policy where it has shaped the evolution of the human development index (HDI), has been much discussed in philosophy, and is increasingly influential in a range of social sciences.

More recently, the approach has been criticized for being grounded in the liberal notion of freedom:

This is a fundamentally reductive view of the human condition. Moreover, the emphasis on freedom betrays a profoundly modern orientation. The compound problem is that freedom in Nussbaum's hands is both given an intrinsic and primary value (a reductive claim), and, at the same time, the list is treated as a contingent negotiated relation in tension with other virtues such as justice, equality and rights. Both propositions cannot hold.

The core capabilities Nussbaum argues should be supported by all democracies are:

1. Life. Being able to live to the end of a human life of normal length; not dying prematurely, or before one's life is so reduced as to be not worth living.
2. Bodily Health. Being able to have good health, including reproductive health; to be adequately nourished; to have adequate shelter.
3. Bodily integrity. Being able to move freely from place to place; to be secure against violent assault, including sexual assault and domestic violence; having opportunities for sexual satisfaction and for choice in matters of reproduction.
4. Senses, Imagination, and Thought. Being able to use the senses, to imagine, think, and reason—and to do these things in a "truly human" way, a way informed and cultivated by an adequate education, including, but by no means limited to, literacy and basic mathematical and scientific training. Being able to use imagination and thought in connection with experiencing and producing works and events of one's own choice, religious, literary, musical, and so forth. Being able to use one's mind in ways protected by guarantees of freedom of expression with respect to both political and artistic speech, and freedom of religious exercise. Being able to have pleasurable experiences and to avoid non-beneficial pain.
5. Emotions. Being able to have attachments to things and people outside ourselves; to love those who love and care for us, to grieve at their absence; in general, to love, to grieve, to experience longing, gratitude, and justified anger. Not having one's emotional development blighted by fear and anxiety. (Supporting this capability means supporting forms of human association that can be shown to be crucial in their development.)
6. Practical Reason. Being able to form a conception of the good and to engage in critical reflection about the planning of one's life. (This entails protection for the liberty of conscience and religious observance.)
7. Affiliation.
  1. Being able to live with and toward others, to recognize and show concern for other humans, to engage in various forms of social interaction; to be able to imagine the situation of another. (Protecting this capability means protecting institutions that constitute and nourish such forms of affiliation, and also protecting the freedom of assembly and political speech.)
  2. Having the social bases of self-respect and non-humiliation; being able to be treated as a dignified being whose worth is equal to that of others. This entails provisions of non-discrimination on the basis of race, sex, sexual orientation, ethnicity, caste, religion, national origin and species.
8. Other Species. Being able to live with concern for and in relation to animals, plants, and the world of nature.
9. Play. Being able to laugh, to play, to enjoy recreational activities.
10. Control over one's Environment.
  1. Political. Being able to participate effectively in political choices that govern one's life; having the right of political participation, protections of free speech and association.
  2. Material. Being able to hold property (both land and movable goods), and having property rights on an equal basis with others; having the right to seek employment on an equal basis with others; having the freedom from unwarranted search and seizure. In work, being able to work as a human, exercising practical reason and entering into meaningful relationships of mutual recognition with other workers.

Although Nussbaum did not claim her list as definite and unchanging, she strongly advocated for outlining a list of central human capabilities. On the other hand, Sen refuses to supply a specific list of capabilities. Sen argues that an exact list and weights would be too difficult to define. For one, it requires specifying the context of use of capabilities, which could vary. Also, Sen argues that part of the richness of the capabilities approach is its insistence on the need for open valuational scrutiny for making social judgments. He is disinclined to in any way devalue the domain of reasoning in the public sphere. Instead, Sen argues that the task of weighing various capabilities should be left to the ethical and political considerations of each society based on public reasoning. Along with concerns raised about Nussbaum's list, Alkire and Black also argue that Nussbaum's methodology "runs counter to an essential thrust of the capabilities approach which has been the attempt to redirect development theory away from a reductive focus on a minimally decent life towards a more holistic account of human well-being for all people."

That said, applications to development are discussed in Sen (1999), Nussbaum (2000), and Clark (2002, 2005), and are now numerous to the point where the capabilities approach is widely accepted as a paradigm in development. The programme of work operationalising the capability approach by Anand and colleagues draws heavily on Nussbaum's list as a relatively comprehensive, high-level account of the space in which human well-being or life quality is experienced. This work argues that the subitems on Nussbaum's list are too distinct to be monitored by single question and that a dashboard of some 40-50 indicators is required to inform the development of empirical work.

== Measurement of capabilities ==
The measurement of capabilities was previously thought to be a particular barrier to the implementation and use of the approach. However, two particular lines of work, in research and policy have sought to show that meaningful indicators of what individuals (and in some cases governments) are able to do can be developed and used to generate a range of insights.

In 1990, the UN Human Development report published the first such exercise which focused on health, education and income which were equally weighted to generate the Human Development Index. At the same time, and subsequently, researchers recognizing that these three areas covered only certain elements of life quality have sought to develop more comprehensive measures. A major project in this area has been the 'capabilities measurement project' in which Anand has led teams of philosophers, economists and social scientists to generate that gives a full and direct implement of the approach drawing particular on the key relations and concepts developed in Sen (1985) but also on work to do with the content of the approach. The earliest work in this project developed a set of around 50 capability indicators which were used to develop a picture of quality of life and deprivation in the UK. Subsequently, Anand and colleagues have developed datasets for the US, UK and Italy in which all the elements of Sen's framework are reflected in data which permits all three key equations, for functionings, experience and capabilities, to be estimated.

In a series of papers, they have shown that both their primary data and some secondary datasets can be used to shed light on the production and distribution of life quality for working age adults, those in retirement, very young children, those vulnerable to domestic violence, migrants, excluded traveler communities and the disabled. They use these applications to argue that the capability framework is a particularly good fit for understanding quality of life across the life course and that it provides a relatively universal grammar for understanding the elements of human well-being.

=== Monetary vs. non-monetary measures of well-being ===
Monetary and non-monetary measures of well-being are ideal when used to complement each other. Understanding the various aspects of economic development process not only helps address issues of inequality and lags in human development, but also helps to pinpoint where countries lag, which once addressed can further promote well-being and advancement. As the Organisation for Economic Co-operation and Development (OECD) (2006) notes:

Well-being has several dimensions of which monetary factors are only one. They are nevertheless an important one, since richer economies are better placed to create and maintain other well-being-enhancing conditions, such as a clean environment, the likelihood that the average person will have a right to 10 years or more of education, and lead a comparatively long and healthy life. Well-being will also be increased by institutions that enable citizens to feel that they control their own lives, and that investment of their time and resources will be rewarded. In turn, this will lead to higher incomes in a virtuous circle.

Simon Kuznets, the developer of GNP, cautioned against using the measure as an indicator of overall welfare, which speaks to the unintended use of output-based measures as indicators of human welfare.

==== Critique of output-based measures ====
The use of GDP and GNP as an approximation of well-being and development have been critiqued widely, because they are often misused as indicators of well-being and human development when in fact they are only telling about the economic capacity of a country or an average income level when expressed on a per person basis. In particular, feminist economics and environmental economics offer a number of critiques. Critics in these fields typically discuss gender inequalities, insufficient representation of environmental costs of productions and general issues of misusing an output-based measure for unintended purposes. In sum, the conclusion of Capabilities Approach is that people do not just value monetary income, and that development is linked to various indicators of life satisfaction and hence are important in measuring well-being. Development policies strive to create an environment for people to live long, healthy creative lives.

Feminist critiques

Nussbaum highlights some of the problematic assumptions and conclusions of output-based approaches to development. First, she notes that GNP and GDP do not consider special requirements to help the most vulnerable, such as women. Specifically, Nussbaum mentions that output-based approaches ignore the distribution of needs for the varying circumstances of people, for example a pregnant woman needs more resources than a non-pregnant woman or a single man.

Also, output-based measures ignore unpaid work, which includes child rearing and the societal advantages that result from a mother's work. Marilyn Waring, a political economist and activist for women's rights, elaborates on the example of a mother engaged in child care, domestic care and producing few goods for the informal market, all of which are usually done simultaneously. These activities provide economic benefits, but are not valued in national accounting systems; this suggests that the definition of unemployment used in output-based measures is inappropriate. (See the article on Feminist economics, section "Well-being").

Environmental critiques

Another critique by Waring is that the output-based measures ignore negative effects of economic growth and so commodities that lower social welfare, such as nuclear weapons, and oil extraction which causes spills, are considered a good input. The "anti-bads" or the defensive expenditures to fight "bads" are not counted as a deduction in accounting systems (p. 11). Furthermore, natural resources are treated as limitless and negative outputs such as pollution and associated health risks, are not deducted from the measures.

Technical and misinterpretation critiques

When GNP and GDP were developed, their intended use was not for measuring human well-being; the intended use was as an indicator of economic growth, and that does not necessarily translate into human well-being. Kuznets has often made this point, in his words, "distinctions must be kept in mind between quantity and quality of growth, between costs and returns and between the short and long run. Goals for more growth should specify more growth of what and for what" (p. 9).

Nussbaum also points out that GNP and GDP omit income distribution and the opportunity or ability to turn resources into activities (this critique stems directly from Capabilities Approach). Kuznets terms this as a problem of "obtaining an unduplicated total of all output", (p. 15) this suggests that people are only seen as consumers and not as potential producers, hence any products purchased by an individual are not seen as "being consumed in the productive process of turning out other goods" (p. 15)

These accounting measures also fail to capture all forms of work and only focus on "engagement in work 'for pay or profit'", (p. 133) leaving out contributions to a society and economy, like volunteer work and subsistence farming. Kuznets provides the example of the process by which farmers devote time and energy to bringing virgin land into cultivation. Furthermore, GNP and GDP only account for monetary exchanges, and place no value on some important intangibles such as leisure time.

=== Shift to alternative measures ===
Capabilities Approach has been highly influential thus far in human development theories and valuational methods of capturing capabilities, the theory has led to the creation of the HDI, IHDI and GII and their uses among international organizations such as the United Nations and others. In companies, capabilities are included in Key Development Indicators, or KDIs as measures of development, including employee development. In 1990 in the Human Development Report (HDR)commissioned by the UNDP set out to create a distribution-sensitive development measure.

This measure was created to rival the more traditional metrics of GDP and GNP, which had previously been used to measure level of development in a given country, but which did not contain provisions for terms of distribution. The resulting measure was entitled the Human Development Index, created by Mahbub ul Haq in collaboration with Sen and others. The purpose was to create an indicator of human development, especially one that would provide a general assessment and critique of global human development to shed light on persistent inequality, poverty and other capability deprivations despite high levels of GDP growth.

Currently the HDI continues to be used in the Human Development Report in addition to many other measures (based on theoretical perspectives of Capabilities) that have been developed and used by the United Nations. Among these indices are the Gender-related Development Index (GDI), the Gender Empowerment Measure (GEM), introduced in 1995, and the more recent Gender Inequality Index (GII) and the Inequality-adjusted Human Development Index (IHDI), both adopted in 2010.

=== Capabilities-based indices ===
The following are a few of the major indices that were created based on the theoretical grounds of Capabilities Approach.

==== Human development index ====
The Human Development Index takes into consideration a number of development and well-being factors that are not taken into account in the calculation of GDP and GNP. The Human Development Index is calculated using the indicators of life expectancy, adult literacy, school enrollment, and logarithmic transformations of per-capita income. Moreover, it is noted that the HDI "is a weighted average of income adjusted for distributions and purchasing power, life expectancy, literacy and health" (p. 16)

The HDI is calculated for individual countries with a value between 0 and 1 and is "interpreted...as the ultimate development that has been attained by that nation" (p. 17). Currently, the 2011 Human Development Report also includes the Inequality-adjusted Human Development Index which accounts for exactly the same things that the HDI considers however the IHDI has all three dimensions (long and healthy life, knowledge and a decent standard of living) adjusted for inequalities in the distribution of each dimension across the population.

==== Gender-related development index ====
The Gender-related Development Index is defined as a "distribution-sensitive measure that accounts for the human development impact of existing gender gaps in the three components of the HDI" (p. 243). In this way, the GDI accounts for shortcomings in the HDI in terms of gender, because it re-evaluates a country's score in the three areas of the HDI based on perceived gender gaps, and penalizes the score of the country if, indeed, large gender disparities in those areas exist. This index is used in unison with the HDI and therefore also captures the elements of capabilities that the HDI holds. In addition, it considers women's capabilities which has been a focus in much of Sen's and Nussbaum's work (to list a few: Nussbaum, 2004a; Nussbaum, 2004b; Sen, 2001; Sen, 1990.)

==== Gender empowerment measure ====
The Gender Empowerment Measure (GEM) is considerably more specialized than the GDI. The GEM focuses particularly on the relative empowerment of women in a given country. The empowerment of women is measured by evaluating women's employment in high-ranking economic positions, seats in parliament, and share of household income. Notably this measurement captures more of Nussbaum's 10 Central Capabilities, such as, Senses, Imagination and Thought; Affiliation; and Control Over One's Environment.

==== Gender inequality index ====
In the 2013 Human Development Report the Gender Inequality Index, which was introduced in 2011, continues to adjust the GDI and the GEM. This composite measurement uses three dimensions: reproductive health, empowerment, and labor force participation. When constructing the index the following criteria were key: conceptual relevance to definitions of human development and theory; Non-ambiguity so that the index is easily interpreted; Reliability of data that is standardized and collected/processed by a trustworthy organization; No redundancy found in other indicators; and lastly Power of discrimination, where distribution is well distinguished among countries and there is no "bunching" among top and bottom countries (p. 10). This index also captures some of Nussbaum's 10 Central Capabilities (Senses, Imagination and Thought; Affiliation; and Control Over Ones Environment).

==== Other measures ====
In 1997, the UNDP introduced the Human Poverty Index (HPI), which is aimed at measuring poverty in both industrialized and developing countries. The HPI is a "nonincome-based" measure of poverty (p. 100) which focuses on "human outcomes in terms of choices and opportunities that a person faces" (p. 99). In support of this index, Sakiko Fukuda-Parr—a development economist and past Director of The Human Development Report Office—differentiates between income poverty and human poverty. Human poverty can be interpreted as deprivations to lead a long healthy and creative life with a decent standard of living.

=== Economic evaluation in health care ===
The capability approach is being developed and increasingly applied in health economics, for use in cost-effectiveness analysis. It is seen as an alternative to existing preference-based measures of health-related quality of life (for example the EQ-5D) that focus on functioning, and can be applied within the framework of quality-adjusted life years (QALYs). A number of measures have been created for use in particular contexts such as older people, public health and mental health, as well as more generic capability-based outcome measures. Caution remains when measures do not explicitly rule out people's adaption to their circumstances, for example to physical health problems.

=== Alternative measures of well-being ===
As noted above, to a great extent, Nussbaum's Central Human Capabilities address issues of equality, political freedom, creativity and the right to the self, as do the various indices that are based on capabilities. It is evident that these measures are very subjective, but this fact is in the essence of defining quality of life according to Nussbaum and Sen. Nussbaum refers to Sen in saying that, although measures of well-being may be problematic in comparative, quantifiable models due to their subjective matter, the protection of and commitment to human development are too important of matters to be left on the sidelines of economic progress. Well-being and quality of life are too important to be left without intentional focus towards political change.

Measures such as the HDI, GDI, GEM, GII, IHDI and the like are crucial in targeting issues of well-being and indicators of quality of life. Anand, et al. (2009) can be summarized as demonstrating that it is possible to measure capabilities within the conventions applied to standard household survey design, contrary to earlier doubts about the ability to operationalise the capabilities approach.

== Contrast with other approaches ==
=== Utility-based or subjective approaches ===
Much of conventional welfare economics today is grounded in a utilitarian approach according to the classical Benthamite form of utilitarianism, in which the most desirable action is the one that best increases peoples' psychological happiness or satisfaction. The "utility" of a person stands for some measure of his or her pleasure or happiness. Some merits associated with this approach to measuring well-being are that it recognizes the importance of taking account of the results of social arrangements in judging them and the need to pay attention to the well-being of the people involved when judging social arrangements and their results. Amartya Sen, however, argues this view has three main deficiencies: distributional indifference; neglect of rights, freedoms, and other non-utility concerns; and adaptation and mental conditioning.

Distributional indifference refers to a utilitarian indifference between different the distributions of utility, so long as the sum total is the same (note that the utilitarian is indifferent to the distribution of happiness, not income or wealth—the utilitarian approach would generally prefer, all else being equal, more materially equal societies assuming diminishing marginal utility). Sen argues that we may "want to pay attention not just to "aggregate" magnitudes, but also to extents of inequalities in happiness". Sen also argues that while the utilitarian approach attaches no intrinsic value (ethics) to claims of rights and freedoms, some people value these things independently of their contribution to utility.

Lastly, Amartya Sen makes the argument that the utilitarian view of individual well-being can be easily swayed by mental conditioning and peoples' happiness adapting to oppressive situations. The utility calculus can essentially be unfair to those who have come to terms with their deprivation as a means for survival, adjusting their desires and expectations. The capability approach, on the other hand, doesn't fall victim to these same criticisms because it acknowledges inequalities by focusing on equalizing people's capabilities, rather than happiness. It stresses the intrinsic importance of rights and freedoms when evaluating well-being, and it avoids overlooking deprivation by focusing on capabilities and opportunities, not state of mind.

=== Resource-based approaches ===
Another common approach in conventional economics, in economic policy and judging development, has traditionally been to focus on income and resources. These sorts of approaches to development focus on increasing resources, such as assets, property rights, or basic needs. However, measuring resources is fundamentally different from measuring functionings, such as the case in which people don't have the capability to use their resources in the means they see fit. Arguably, the main difficulty in a resource- or income-based approach to well-being lies in personal heterogeneities, namely the diversity of human beings.

Different amounts of income are needed for different individuals to enjoy similar capabilities, such as an individual with severe disabilities whose treatment to ensure the fulfillment of basic capabilities may require dramatically more income compared to an able-bodied person. All sorts of differences, such as differences in age, gender, talents, etc. can make two people have extremely divergent opportunities of quality of life, even when equipped with exactly the same commodities. Additionally, other contingent circumstances which affect what an individual can make of a given set of resources include environmental diversities (in geographic sense), variations in social climate, differences in relational perspectives, and distribution within the family.

The capability approach, however, seeks to consider all such circumstances when evaluating people's actual capabilities. Furthermore, there are things people value other than increased resources. In some cases, maximizing resources may even be objectionable. As was recognized in the 1990 Human Development Report, the basic objective of development is to create an enabling environment for people to live long, healthy, and creative lives. This end is often lost in the immediate concern with the accumulation of commodities and financial wealth that are only a means to expansion of capabilities. Overall, though resources and income have a profound effect on what can or cannot be done, the capability approach recognizes that they are not the only things to be considered when judging well-being, switching the focus from a means to a good life to the freedom to achieve actual improvements in lives, which one has reason to value.

== Application to education ==
The capability approach has also impacted educational discourse. Rather than seeing the success of an education system based on the measurable achievements of students, such as scores in examinations or assessments, educational success through a capabilities perspective can be seen through the capabilities that such an education enables. Through an education programme a student is able to acquire knowledge, skills, values and understanding and this enables a young person to think in new ways, to ‘be’, to develop agency in society and make decisions. These are not easily ‘measurable’ in the same way examination results are, but can be seen to be an important outcome of an educational programme. A number of writers have explored what these education ‘capabilities’ might be. Terzi's list focuses on the minimum entitlement of education for students with disabilities—these include Literacy, Numeracy, Sociality and Participation among others. Walker, working in Higher Education offers Practical Reason, Emotional Resilience, Knowledge and Imagination. Hinchcliffe offers a set of capabilities for students of Humanities subjects, including critical examination and judgement, narrative imagination, recognition/ concern for others (citizenship in a globalised world). Further exploration of the capability approach to education has sought to explore the role that subject disciplines play in the generation of subject specific capabilities, drawing on the ideas of Powerful Knowledge from Michael Young and the Sociology of Education. Geography as a school subject has explored these as ‘GeoCapabilities’.

== See also ==
- Demographic economics
- Economic development
- Ethics of care
- Human Development and Capability Association
- Human Development Index
- International Association for Feminist Economics
- International development
- Journal of Human Development and Capabilities
- List of publications in economics § Development economics
- Oxford Poverty and Human Development Initiative
- Socioeconomic impact of female education
- Sustainable development
- Welfare economics
