= Ingrid Robeyns =

Belgian/Dutch philosopher (born 1972)

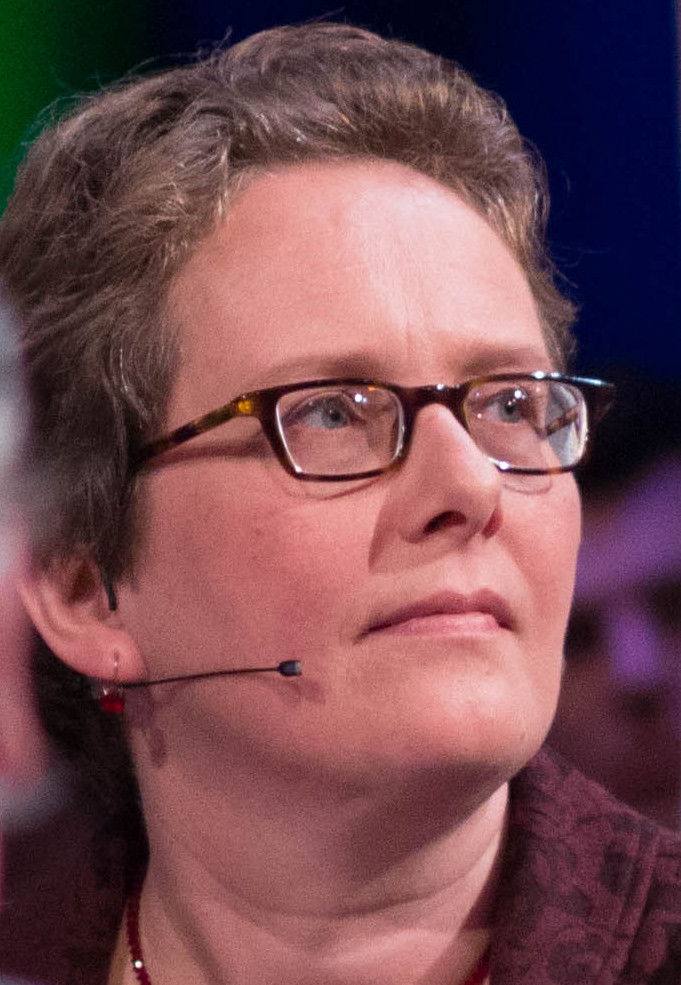
- Robeyns in 2014
- Born: Ingrid A. M. Robeyns; 10 September 1972 (age 54); Leuven, Belgium

Academic background
- Education: KU Leuven (Lic., MSc); Open University (MA); University of Cambridge (PhD)
- Thesis: Gender Inequality: A Capability Perspective (2002)
- Doctoral advisor: Amartya Sen
- Influences: Martha Nussbaum

Academic work
- School or tradition: Capability approach
- Institutions: Utrecht University; Erasmus University Rotterdam
- Main interests: Welfare economics; development economics; ethics
- Notable ideas: Human development theory; limitarianism
- Website: ingridrobeyns.info

Ingrid A. M. Robeyns (born 1972) is a Belgian/Dutch philosopher who holds the Chair in Ethics of Institutions at Utrecht University's Faculty of Humanities and the associated Ethics Institute. She is also a fellow of the Human Development and Capability Association and was elected the association's eighth president in April 2017. She is an advocate of economic limitarianism.

== Biography ==
Robeyns was born in Leuven, Belgium, in 1972. She earned a licentiate qualification in economics from the KU Leuven in 1994. She went on to study social and political science at the University of Göttingen in Germany. She returned to KU Leuven for her MSc in economics, which she completed in 1997. She obtained her doctorate in economics from the University of Cambridge in 2003, with a dissertation was on gender inequality and the capability approach. Robeyns also has an MA in philosophy from the Open University (2007).

Robeyns claimed dual Dutch/Belgian citizenship in 2013.

== Academic career ==
In 2006, the Netherlands Organisation for Scientific Research awarded Robeyns a five-year grant for research on theories of justice. The work considers what the question of justice means within the welfare state for children, parents, and non-parents. In 2018, Robeyns was elected a member of the Royal Netherlands Academy of Arts and Sciences.

== Publications ==
- Robeyns, Ingrid (July 2002). Gender inequality: a capability perspective (PhD thesis). Cambridge University. OCLC 894596063.
- Robeyns, Ingrid; Kuklys, Wiebke (2004). Sen's Capability Approach to welfare economics – Cambridge working paper in economics 0415 (PDF). Cambridge, England: Department of Applied Economics, University of Cambridge. Archived from the original (PDF) on 18 November 2017.
- Robeyns, Ingrid; Agarwal, Bina; Humpries, Jane (2005). Amartya Sen's work and ideas: a gender perspective. Oxon, England: Routledge. ISBN 9780415373203.
- Robeyns, Ingrid; Brighouse, Harry (2010). Measuring justice: primary goods and capabilities. Cambridge, England: Cambridge University Press. ISBN 9781843156994.
- Robeyns, Ingrid (2014). The Capability Approach. Cambridge, England: Open Book Publishers. ISBN 9781909254909
- Robeyns, Ingrid; van Hees, Martin; Nys, Thomas (2014). Basisboek ethiek. Amsterdam, Holland: Uitgeverij Boom. ISBN 9789461059321.
- Robeyns, Ingrid (2017). Wellbeing, Freedom and Social Justice: The Capability Approach Re-Examined. Cambridge, England: Open Book Publishers. doi:10.11647/OBP.0130. hdl:10419/182376. ISBN 9781783744237.
- Robeyns, Ingrid (2019). "What, if Anything, is Wrong with Extreme Wealth?". Journal of Human Development and Capabilities. 20 (3). Journal of Human Development and Capabilities 20:3: 251–266. doi:10.1080/19452829.2019.1633734.
- Robeyns, Ingrid (2024). Limitarianism: The Case Against Extreme Wealth. London: Allen Lane/Penguin. ISBN 978-0-241-57819-3

== See also ==
- Feminist economics
- Feminist philosophy
- Feminist theory
- List of feminist economists
- Political philosophy
