= Harry Brighouse =

British philosopher

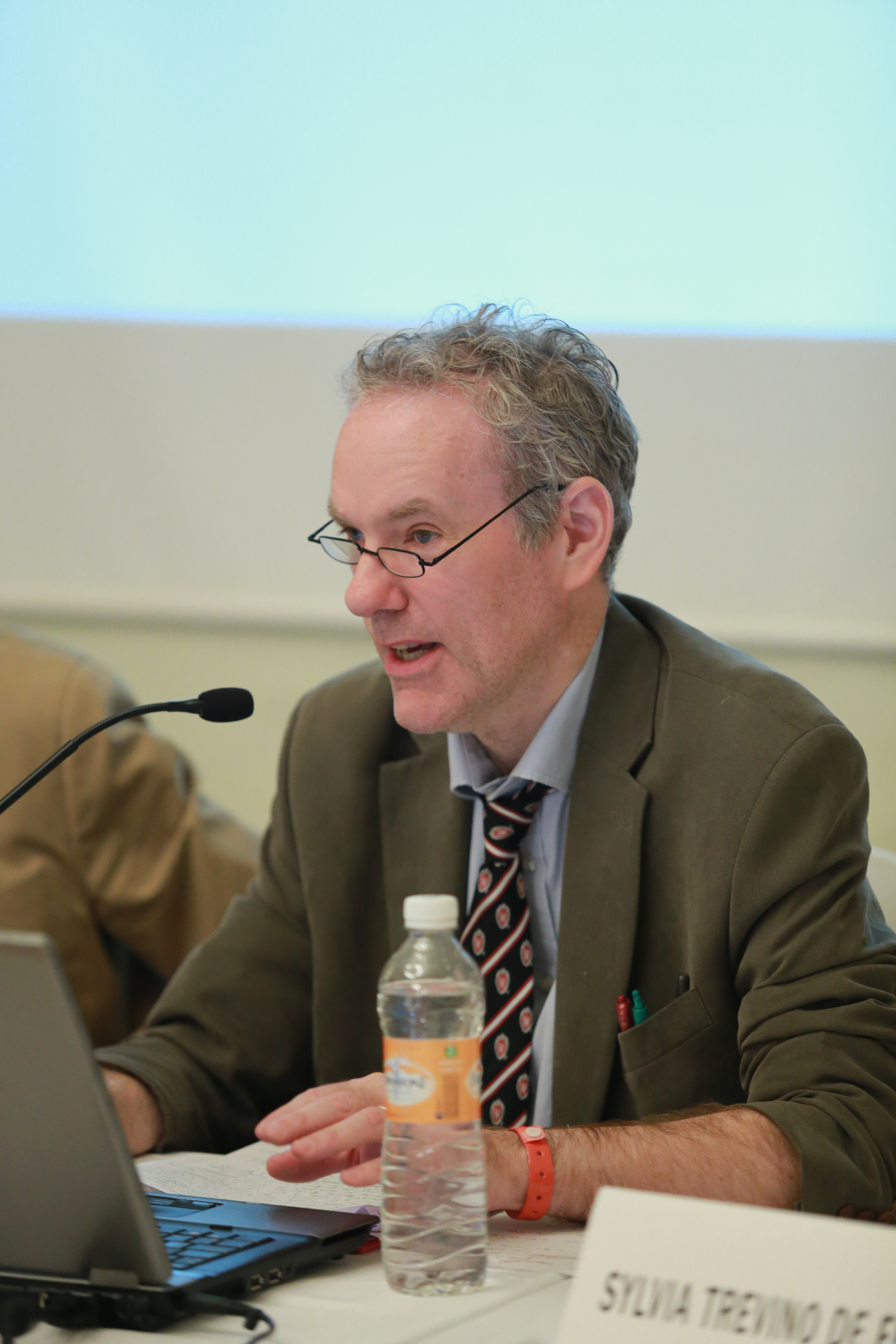
- Brighouse in 2015

Education
- Education: King's College London (BA); University of Southern California (PhD)

Philosophical work
- Institutions: University of Wisconsin–Madison
- Main interests: Political philosophy

Harry Brighouse is a British political philosopher at the University of Wisconsin–Madison. His research interests include moral philosophy and the relationship between education and liberalism. Brighouse is particularly famous for his book with philosopher and sociologist Adam Swift, Family Values: The Ethics of Parent-Child Relationships (2014: Princeton University Press), which is considered seminal work on the moral philosophy of the family.

Brighouse has engaged himself in public debate on the topic of education and liberalism, and has been cited by publication such as The Independent, The Guardian. New Statesman.

Brighouse received his B.A. from King's College London and earned his PhD in philosophy from the University of Southern California, under the direction of Barbara Herman. He is the son of Tim Brighouse, former commissioner of schools for London.

Brighouse is a member of the Crooked Timber group blog.

== Honours ==
He was a Carnegie Scholar chosen by the Carnegie Corporation of New York in 2004 to work on a project entitled Educational Justice and Institutional Reform. He is also a Senior Adviser to the Spencer Foundation, a Chicago-based nonprofit dedicated to improving education through nonpartisan, high-quality academic research. Brighouse is also a Fellow of the Human Development and Capability Association (HDCA).

== Selected bibliography ==
=== Books ===
- Brighouse, Harry (2000). A level playing field: the reform of private schools. London: Fabian Society. ISBN 9780716330523.
- Brighouse, Harry (2000). School choice and social justice. Oxford New York: Oxford University Press. ISBN 9780198295860.
- Brighouse, Harry (2003). School choice and social justice. Oxford New York: Oxford University Press. ISBN 9780199257874.
- Brighouse, Harry (2004). Justice. Cambridge: Polity. ISBN 9780745625966. Translated into Polish as Brighouse, Harry (2007). Sprawiedliwość. Warszawa: Wydawnictwo Sic. ISBN 9788360457306.
- Brighouse, Harry; Brock, Gillian (2005). The political philosophy of cosmopolitanism. Cambridge New York: Cambridge University Press. ISBN 9780521846608.
- Brighouse, Harry (2006). On education. London New York: Routledge. ISBN 9780415327893.
- Brighouse, Harry (2007). Sprawiedliwość. Warszawa: Wydawnictwo Sic. ISBN 9788360457306.
- Brighouse, Harry; Robeyns, Ingrid (2010). Measuring justice: primary goods and capabilities. Cambridge, England: Cambridge University Press. ISBN 9781843156994.

=== Chapter in books ===
- Brighouse, Harry (1998), "School choice: theoretical considerations", in Bowles, Samuel; Gintis, Herbert (eds.), Recasting egalitarianism: new rules for communities, states, and markets, England: New York Verso, pp. 141–180, ISBN 9781859848630
- Brighouse, Harry (2007), "Schooling in a socialist society", in Anton, Anatole; Schmitt, Richard (eds.), Toward a new socialism, Lanham, MD: Lexington Books, pp. 231–246, ISBN 9780739118627
- Brighouse, Harry (2009), "Moral and political aims of education", in Siegel, Harvey (ed.), The Oxford handbook of philosophy of education, Oxford New York: Oxford University Press, pp. 35–51, ISBN 9780195312881
- Brighouse, Harry (2012), "Civility, citizenship, and the limits of schooling", in Mower, Deborah S; Robison, Wade L (eds.), Civility in politics and education, New York: Routledge, ISBN 9780415897259
- Brighouse, Harry; Unterhalter, Elaine (2013), "Primary goods, capabilities, and the millennium development target for gender equity in education", in Comim, Flavio; Nussbaum, Martha C (eds.), Capabilities, gender, equality: towards fundamental entitlements, Cambridge: Cambridge University Press, pp. 215–243, ISBN 9781107015692

=== Journals ===
- Brighouse, Harry (October 2001). "Can justice as fairness accommodate the disabled?". Social Theory and Practice. 27 (4): 537–560. doi:10.5840/soctheorpract200127433.
- Brighouse, Harry (June 2007). "Equality of opportunity and complex equality: the special place of schooling". Res Publica. 13 (2): 147–158. doi:10.1007/s11158-007-9029-8. S2CID 144600641.
- Brighouse, Harry; Swift, Adam (May 2009). "Educational adequacy versus educational equality". Journal of Applied Philosophy. 26 (2): 117–128. doi:10.1111/j.1468-5930.2009.00438.x. S2CID 145719146.
- Brighouse, Harry; Wright, Erik Olin (September 2008). "Strong gender egalitarianism". Politics and Society. 36 (3): 360–372. doi:10.1177/0032329208320566. S2CID 18294468.
- Brighouse, Harry; Fleurbaey, Marc (June 2010). "Democracy and proportionality". Journal of Political Philosophy. 18 (2): 137–155. doi:10.1111/j.1467-9760.2008.00316.x.

=== Notable blog contributions ===
- Harry, (blog) (11 May 2004). "In defence of marriage?". Crooked Timber.
- Harry, (blog) (27 August 2013). "J K Rowling for grown ups". Crooked Timber.
- Harry, (blog) (3 December 2013). "Stereotype threat and philosophy's problem". Crooked Timber.
- Harry, (blog) (30 March 2014). "Assigning one's own books to one's students". Crooked Timber.
