= Martha Chen =

American academic, scholar and social worker

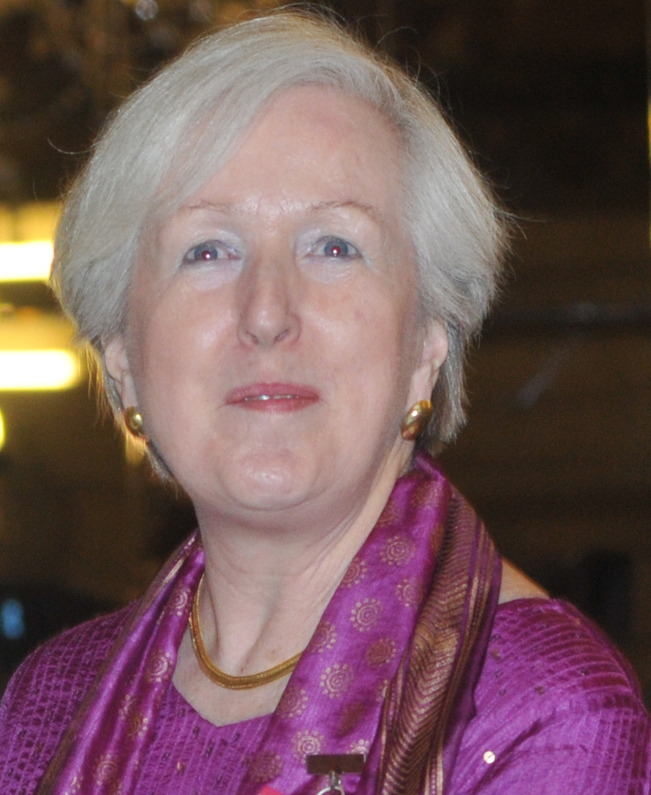
- Martha Chen in 2011
- Born: Martha Alter; February 9, 1944 (age 82); Tennessee, United States
- Education: Connecticut College (BA); University of Pennsylvania (PhD)
- Occupations: Educator, academic
- Spouse: Lincoln Chen
- Children: 2
- Relatives: Tom Alter (brother); Stephen Alter (first cousin)

Martha Alter Chen (born February 9, 1944) is an American academic, scholar and social worker, who is presently a lecturer in public policy at the Harvard Kennedy School and senior advisor of the global research-policy-action network WIEGO (Women in Informal Employment: Globalizing and Organizing) and a member of the Advisory Board of the United Nations University World Institute for Development Economics Research (UNU-WIDER). Martha is a development practitioner and scholar who has worked with the working poor in India, South Asia, and around the world. Her areas of specialization are employment, poverty alleviation, informal economy, and gender. She lived in Bangladesh working with BRAC, one of the world's largest non-governmental organizations, and in India, as field representative of Oxfam America for India and Bangladesh for 15 years.

In 2011, she received the Padma Shri from the Government of India for her contributions in the field of social work. She also received the Friends of Bangladesh Liberation War award by the Government of Bangladesh.

== Early years ==
Martha was born on February 9, 1944, to Barbara and Jim Alter in rural Tennessee. Her family hailed from Ohio in the USA. Martha's grandparents had come to India as missionaries of the Presbyterian church. They pursued their missionary activities in undivided Punjab (mostly in Sialkot and Peshawar) and Martha's father was born in Sialkot. Later on, Martha's paternal grandfather took up a position as headmaster of Woodstock School in Landour, on the outskirts of Mussoorie. Their family settled here. Martha grew up largely in the hills of Mussoorie and Landour and in the northern Indian state of Uttarakhand. She was one of three children. Her brothers were Tom Alter, the well-known film and theatre actor, and John Alter.

== Education ==
She attended Woodstock School from 1948 to 1960. After graduating, she studied for a year at Isabella Thoburn College in Lucknow, India. She then went to the US for her undergraduate and graduate studies, where she received a B.A. Cum Laude (with honors in English literature) from Connecticut College for Women and a PhD in South Asian Studies from the University of Pennsylvania.

== Career milestones and honours ==
During the 1970s and much of the 1980s, Chen lived with her husband and children in Bangladesh, where she worked with the NGO BRAC. Afterward, she lived in India, where she was the field representative of Oxfam America covering India and Bangladesh. They arrived in Dhaka when a cyclone and tidal wave hit the coasts of the city. She then went on to provide a cyclone relief operation with three other women. Moreover, during this period, the tensions between Bangladesh and Pakistan was on a rise and all the Americans in Dhaka were evacuated to Karachi in Pakistan and then to Tehran. Once they reached the US, Martha and her husband joined the "Friends of Bangladesh" political campaign against the US for supporting West Pakistan. The money left over from the cyclone relief was used to start an NGO for Bengali refugees returning from India called the Bangladesh Rehabilitation Assistance Committee (BRAC), which is now the largest non governmental agency in the world. Along with Bengali colleagues, she helped trained Bangladeshi women in animal husbandry, fish culture and helped revive traditional handicrafts so that women in remote villages have a form of income.

Martha joined Harvard University in 1987 and teaches at the Harvard Kennedy School. She has undertaken four field studies in India: on household coping strategies during a prolonged drought in a village in Gujarat; on widows in 14 villages in seven states; on the membership of the Self-Employed Women's Association (SEWA), and on the urban clients of the SEWA Bank. She carried out policy research on issues relating to the working poor, taught several courses on international development, and provided advisory services to international development agencies.

In 1997, Chen co-founded (with Ela Bhatt and Renana Jhabvala of SEWA) the WIEGO network which works to raise the voice and visibility of the working poor – including domestic workers, home-based producers, street vendors, and waste pickers – around the world. In 1999, the Radcliffe Institute for Advanced Study at Harvard University invited Chen to be its Horner Distinguished Visiting Professor in recognition of her scholarship on the situation of working poor women around the world. In 2001, the Radcliffe Institute extended appointment for a third year. From 2003 to 2006, she was a visiting professor at the SEWA Academy in India.

In 2006, Woodstock School in Mussoorie recognized Chen as a Distinguished Alumna for her work with poor women in South Asia, especially for her work examining the status of widows in India by undertaking extensive field research and organizing a national conference on what can be done to improve the status of widows. Chen edited a volume of proceedings from the conference called Widows in Rural India: Social Neglect and Public Action. She is one of the Board Members of the Technological Change Lab (TCN) at Columbia University.

== Personal life ==
Martha Alter is married to Lincoln Chen; the couple has two children and six grandchildren.

== Awards and honours ==
- The Connecticut College Medal (2015)
- Padma Shri from the Government of India, 2011.
- Distinguished Alumni Award from Woodstock School, India, 2005
- Matina S. Horner Distinguished Visiting Professor, Radcliffe Institute for Advanced Study, Harvard University, 1999–2001
- BA Cum Laude with Honors in English Literature, Connecticut College for Women, 1965

== Publications ==
=== Books ===
- Chen, Martha (1983). A quiet revolution: women in transition in rural Bangladesh. Cambridge, MA: Schenkman Publishing. ISBN 9780870734533.
- Chen, Martha (1986). Indian women: a study of their role in the dairy movement. New Delhi: Vikas Publishers. ISBN 9780706930351.
- Chen, Martha (1989). Coping with seasonality and drought in Western India (PhD thesis). Pennsylvania: University of Pennsylvania.
- Chen, Martha; Carr, Marilyn; Jhabval, Renana (1996). Speaking out: women's economic empowerment in South Asia. London: IT Publications on behalf of Aga Khan Foundation Canada and United Nations Development Fund for Women (UNIFEM). ISBN 9781853393822.
- Chen, Martha (1998). Widows in India: social neglect and public action. New Delhi/Thousand Oaks, Calif: Sage Publications. ISBN 9788170367031.
- Chen, Martha (2000). Perpetual mourning: widowhood in rural India. New Delhi/New York: Oxford University Press. ISBN 9780195648850.
- Chen, Martha; Vanek, Joann (2002). Women and men in the informal economy: a statistical picture. Geneva: Women in Informal Employment: Globalizing and Organizing (WIEGO). (PDF)
- Chen, Martha; Vanek, Joann; Carr, Marilyn (2004). Mainstreaming informal employment and gender in poverty reduction a handbook for policy-makers and other stakeholders. London: Commonwealth Secretariat and International Development Research Centre. ISBN 9780850927979.
- Chen, Martha; Joann Vanek; Francie Lund; James Heintz; Renana Jhabvala; Chris Bonner (2005). The progress of the world's women 2005: women, work and poverty. Women in Informal Employment: Globalizing and Organizing (WIEGO) – for UNIFEM. Archived from the original on 2017-04-24. (PDF)
- Chen, Martha; Jhabvala, Renana; Kanbur, Ravi; Richards, Carol (2007). Membership-based organizations of the poor: concepts, experience and policy. London/New York: Routledge. ISBN 9780415770736.
- Chen, Martha; Bali, Namrata; Kanbur, Ravi (2012). Bridging perspectives: The Cornell-SEWA-WIEGO exposure dialogue programme on labour, informal employment and poverty. India: SEWA Academy. (PDF)

== Monographs ==
- Chen, Martha; Ghuznavi, Ruby (1977). Women in food-for-work: the Bangladesh experience. New York: United Nations – World Food Programme, Committee on Food Aid Policies and Programmes.
- Chen, Martha (1979). Who gets what and why: resource allocation in a Bangladesh village. Dhaka, Bangladesh: Bangladesh Rural Advancement Committee.
- Chen, Martha (1979). Women in food-for-work. Rome, Italy: United Nations World Food Programme.
- Chen, Martha (1983). Developing non-craft employment for women in Bangladesh (issue 7 of Seeds). New York, New York: SEEDS Pamphlet Series. Reprinted in Leonard, Ann (1989). Seeds 2: supporting women's work in the Third World. New York, New York: The Feminist Press at CUNY. ISBN 9780969966203.
- Chen, Martha (1983). The working women's forum: organizing for credit and change (issue 6 of Seeds). New York, New York: SEEDS Pamphlet Series. Reprinted in Leonard, Ann (1989). Seeds 2: supporting women's work in the Third World. New York: The Feminist Press at CUNY. ISBN 9780969966203.
- Chen, Martha (1996). Beyond credit: a subsector approach to promoting women's enterprises. Ottawa: Aga Khan Foundation Canada. ISBN 9780969966203.
- Chen, Martha; Snodgrass, Don (2001). Managing resources, activities, and risk in urban India: the impact of SEWA bank. Washington, D.C.: USAID AIMS Project. (PDF)
- Chen, Martha; Renana Jhabvala; Ravi Kanbur; Nidhi Mirani; Karl Osner (2004). Reality and analysis: personal and technical reflections on the working lives of six women. Cornell-SEWA-WIEGO. (PDF)
- Chen, Martha (2004). Towards economic freedom: the impact of SEWA. Ahmedabad, India: Self-Employed Women's Association (SEWA). pdf version
- Chen, Martha (2004). Self-employed women: a profile of SEWA's membership. Ahmedabad, India: Self-Employed Women's Association (SEWA). (PDF)
- Chen, Martha; Renana Jhabvala; Ravi Kanbur; Nidhi Mirani; Karl Osner; Carol Richards. Membership based organizing of poor women: reflections after an exposure and dialogue program with SEWA in Gujarat, India. Ahmedabad, India: Self-Employed Women's Association (SEWA).

=== Book chapters ===
- "Rural Bangladesh Women in Food-for-Work" (co-authored) in Women in Contemporary India and South Asia, edited by Alfred D'Souza. New Delhi, India: Manohar Publications, 1980.
- "Women and Entrepreneurship: New Approaches from India" in Small Enterprises, New Approaches, edited by Antoinette Gosses et al. The Hague, Netherlands: Operations Review Unit, Ministry of Foreign Affairs, 1989.
- "Poverty, Gender, and Work in Bangladesh" in Structures and Strategies: Women, Work and Family, edited by Leela Dube and Rajni Palriwala. Women and the Household in Asia – Vol. 3. New Delhi, India: Sage Publications, 1990.
- "Women and Wasteland Development in India: An Issues Paper" in Women and Wasteland Development in India, edited by Andrea M. Singh and Neera Burra. New Delhi, India: Sage Publications, 1993.
- Chen, Martha (1995), "A matter of survival: women's right to employment in India and Bangladesh", in Nussbaum, Martha; Glover, Jonathan (eds.), Women, culture, and development: a study of human capabilities, Oxford New York: Clarendon Press Oxford University Press, pp. 37–61, ISBN 9780198289647 (PDF) (also available online)
- "Widowhood and Well-Being in Rural North India" (co-authored with Jean Dreze) in Women's Health in India: Risk and Vulnerability, edited by in M. Das Gupta, L. C. Chen, T.N. Krishnan. New Delhi, India: Oxford University Press, 1995. Reprinted in V. Madan (ed.) The Village in India, New Delhi, India: Oxford University Press, Oxford in India Readings in Sociology and Social Anthropology, 2002.
- "Introduction" in Leonard, Ann, ed. Seeds 2: Supporting Women's Work around the World. New York, New York: The Feminist Press, 1995.
- "The Feminization of Poverty" in A Commitment to the World's Women: Perspectives on Development for Beijing and Beyond, Heyzer, Noeleen with Sushma Kapoor and Joanne Sandler, eds. New York, New York: United Nations Development Fund for Women (UNIFEM), 1995.
- "Why Widowhood Matters" in Women: Looking Beyond 2000. New York, New York: United Nations, 1995.
- "Introduction" (co-authored with and Emily MacFarquhar and Robert Rotberg) in Robert I. Rotberg, ed. Vigilance and Vengeance: NGOs Preventing Ethnic Conflict in Divided Societies. Washington, D.C.: Brookings Institution Press and Cambridge, Massachusetts: World Peace Foundation, 1996.
- "Introduction" in Widows in India: Social Neglect and Public Action, edited by Martha A. Chen. New Delhi, India: Sage Publications, 1998.
- "Informal Employment: Rethinking Workforce Development" (co-authored with Joann Vanek) in Tony Avigan, L. Josh Bivens and Sarah Gammage, eds., Good Jobs, Bad Jobs, No Jobs: Labor Markets and Informal Work in Egypt, El Salvador, India, Russia, and South Africa. Washington, D.C.: Economic Policy Institute, 2005.
- "Rethinking the Informal Economy: Linkages with the Formal Economy and the Formal Regulatory Environment" in Basudeb Guha-Khasnobis, Ravi Kanbur and Elinor Ostrom, eds Unlocking Human Potential: Concepts and Policies for Linking the Informal and Formal Sectors. London, UK: Oxford University Press, 2006.
- "Rethinking the Informal Economy: Linkages with Formal Economy and the Formal Regulatory Environment" in Ocampo, Jose Antonio and Jomo K. S., eds. Towards Full and Decent Employment. London/New York: Zed Books Limited and Hyderabad, India: Orient Longman Private Limited, 2008.
- "A Spreading Banyan Tree: The Self-Employed Women's Association, India" in Alison Mathie and Gordon Cunningham, eds. From Clients to Citizens: Communities Changing the Course of Their Own Development. Rugby, UK: Intermediate Technology Publications Ltd, 2008.
- Chen, Martha Alter (2009), "Famine, widowhood and paid work: seeking gender justice in South Asia", in Kanbur, Ravi; Basu, Kaushik (eds.), Arguments for a better world: essays in honor of Amartya Sen | Volume II: Society, institutions and development, Oxford New York: Oxford University Press, pp. 219–36, ISBN 9780199239979
- "Informalisation of Labour Markets: Is Formalisation the Answer?" In Razavi, Shahra, ed. The Gendered Impacts of Liberalization: Towards "Embedded Liberalism"? New York, US: Routledge Press/UNRISD Series on Gender and Development, 2009.
- "The Self-Employed Women's Association" in Oommen, T.K. ed. Social Movements II: Concerns of Equity and Security. New Delhi, India: Oxford University Press, 2010.
- "Informality, Poverty, and Gender: An Economic Rights Approach" in Andreassen, Bard, Arjun K. Sengupta, and Stephen P. Marks, ed. Freedom from Poverty: Economic Perspectives. Oxford University Press, 2010.

=== Journal articles ===
- "Kantha and Jamdani: Revival in Bangladesh." India International Centre Quarterly, Vol. II, No. 4, December 1984.
- "Poverty, Gender, and Work in Bangladesh ." Economic and Political Weekly, Vol. XXI, No. 5, February 1986.
- "A Sectoral Approach to Promoting Women's Work: Lessons from India," World Development, Vol. 17, No. 7, 1989.
- "Women's Work in Indian Agriculture by Agro-Ecological Zones: Meeting the Needs of Landless and Land-poor Women," Economic and Political Weekly, Vol, XXIV, No. 43, October 1989.
- "Recent Research on Widows in India: Workshop and Conference Report." Economic and Political Weekly, Vol. XXX, No. 39, September 30, 1995 (co-author with Jean Dreze).
- "Engendering World Conferences: The International Women's Movement and the United Nations." Third World Quarterly, Vol. 16, No. 3, 1995.
- "Listening to Widows in Rural India." Women: A Cultural Review, Vol. 8, No. 3, pp. 312–319, 1997.
- "Counting the Invisible Workforce: The Case of Homebased Workers" (co-authored with Jennefer Sebstad and Lesley O'Connell). World Development Vol. 27, No. 3, 1999.
- "Globalization and Homebased Workers" (co-authored with Marilyn Carr and Jane Tate). Feminist Economics, Vol. 6, No. 3, pp. 123–142, 2000.
- "Women in the Informal Sector: A Global Picture, The Global Movement." SAIS Review, Vol. XXI, No. 1, pp. 71–82. Winter-Spring 2000.
- "Rethinking the Informal Economy: In an Era of Global Integration and Labor Market Flexibility." Seminar # 531, November 2003.
- "Globalisation, Social Exclusion, and Work: With Special Reference to Informal Employment and Gender" (co-author with Marilyn Carr). International Labour Review, Vol. 143; No. 1-2, 2004.
- "Informality, Gender, and Poverty: A Global Picture" (co-authored with Joann Vanek and James Heintz). Economic and Political Weekly, Vol. XLI, No. 21, pp. 2131–2139, 2006. Reprinted as a chapter in Dey, Dahlia ed. Informal Sector in a Globalized Era. Hyderabad, India: Icfai University Press.
- "The Urban Informal Workforce: Inclusive Planning for the Urban Poor." UN Habitat Debate. Vol. 13, No. 2. Nairobi: UN Habitat, 2007.
- "Recognizing Domestic Workers, Regulating Domestic Work: Conceptual, Measurement, and Regulatory Challenges." Canadian Journal of Women and the Law, 2011.

=== Encyclopedia and handbook entries ===
- "Non-Governmental Organizations and the State", International Handbook of Education and Development: Preparing Schools, Students and Nations for the Twenty-First Century. Edited by W.K. Cummings and N.F. McGinn. New York and Oxford: Elsevier Science, Ltd. 1997.
- "The Informal Economy", The International Encyclopedia of Organization Studies, 2006.
- "Widows and Widowhood in Contemporary India", The Oxford Encyclopedia of Women in World History. Oxford, UK: Oxford University Press, 2007.
- "Informality, Poverty, and Gender in the Global South" in Chant, Sylvia, ed. Elgar Handbook on Gender, 2010.

=== Other publications ===
- "Rural Women in Bangladesh: Exploding Some Myths" (co-author). Ford Foundation Publication Series, Report No. 42, Dhaka, Bangladesh, 1976.
- "Anandapur Village: BRAC Comes to Town" (co-author). World Education Reports, No. 13, New York, 1976.
- "Women Farmers in Bangladesh: Issues and Proposals," Agricultural Development Agencies in Bangladesh Newsletter, Vol. IV, No. 6, Dhaka, Bangladesh, 1977.
- "Women in Agriculture, Bangladesh" (editor). Agricultural Development Agencies in Bangladesh Newsletter. Vol. IV, No. 6, Dhaka, Bangladesh, 1977.
- BRAC Newsletter (editor). Dhaka, Bangladesh: Bangladesh Rural Advancement Committee, 1976–1980.
- "Ties that Bind: Single Women and Family Structures." Background paper for Human Development Report 1995. New York, New York: United Nations Development Programme and Oxford University Press, 1995.
- Household Economic Portfolios (co-authored with Elizabeth Dunn). Assessing the Impact of Micro-Finance Services (AIMS) Working Paper. Washington, D.C.: USAID, 1996.
- "Supporting Workers in the Informal Economy: A Policy Framework" (co-authored with Renana Jhabvala and Frances Lund). Geneva, Switzerland: International Labour Office, Employment Sector, Working Paper on the Informal Economy No. 2, 2002.
- "Globalization and the Informal Economy: How Global Trade and Investment Impact on the Working Poor" (co-authored with Marilyn Carr). Geneva, Switzerland: International Labour Office, Employment Sector, Working Paper on the Informal Economy No. 1, 2002.
- "Rethinking the Informal Economy: From Enterprise Characteristics to Employment Relations" Ithaca, New York: Cornell University, electronic proceedings of a joint Cornell University-WIEGO conference on "Rethinking Labor Market Informalization: Precarious Jobs, Poverty, and Social Protection", 2003.
- "Reality and Analysis: Personal and Technical Reflections on the Working Lives of Six Women" (co-editor and author). Working Paper 2004–06. Cornell University: Department of Applied Economics and Management.
- "The Investment Climate for Female Informal Businesses: A Case Study from Urban and Rural India" (co-authored with Renana Jhabvala and Reema Nanavaty). Commissioned case study for World Development Report 2005: A Better Investment Climate For Everyone.
- "Reconceptualizing Controls: Individual Transactions, Economic Systems, and Structural Forces" (co-authored with Ratna Sudarshan). Working Paper, WIEGO Website, 2006.
- "Autonomy, Security, and Voice: Informal Women Workers in Ahmedabad City, India" (co-authored with Mirai Chatterjee and Jeemol Unni). Working Paper, WIEGO Website, 2006.
- "Cornell-SEWA-WIEGO 2008 Dialogue – Ahmedabad and Delhi – Compendium of Personal and Technical Notes" Working Paper 2008–15. Cornell University: Department of Applied Economics and Management 2008.
- "Addressing Informality, Reducing Poverty." in Poverty in Focus, Number 16 – Jobs, Jobs, Jobs – The Policy Challenge. Brasilia, Brazil: International Poverty Centre, 2008.
- "Informality in South Asia: A Review" (co-authored with Donna Doane). WIEGO Working Paper No. 4, 2008. (PDF)
- "The Informal Economy: Definitions, Theories and Policies." WIEGO Working Paper No. 1, 2012. (PDF)
