= Renana Jhabvala =

Indian economist and social worker

- Born: Delhi
- Education: University of Delhi, Harvard University, Yale University
- Occupation: Social worker
- Awards: Padma Shri 1990

Renana Jhabvala is an Indian social worker based in Ahmedabad, India, who has been active for decades in organising women into organisations and trade unions in India, and has been extensively involved in policy issues relating to poor women and the informal economy. She is best known for her long association with the Self-Employed Women's Association (SEWA), India, and for her writings on issues of women in the informal economy.

In 1990, she was awarded a Padma Shri from the Government of India for her contributions in the field of social work. In April 2012, she became Chancellor of Gandhigram Rural Institute, a Deemed University in Tamil Nadu, India.

== Early life, family and education ==
Renana Jhabvala was born in Delhi to the Booker Prize winning novelist and screenwriter, Ruth Prawer Jhabvala, and well-known architect Cyrus S. H. Jhabvala. Her grandparents were active in public life during the early to mid part of the twentieth century. Her grandfather, Shavaksha Jhabvala, was active in the early Indian trade union movement, and her grandmother, Mehraben Jhabvala, in the emerging women's movement. In February 2012 talk given at India International Centre (Delhi), Renana spoke about the work of Mehraben, who was a dedicated organiser and advocate of women and the President of the All-India Women's Conference from 1965 to 1968.

Jhabvala was raised and schooled in Delhi and graduated from Hindu College, University of Delhi, in 1972 with a distinction in BSc Maths. She attended Harvard University to pursue an additional degree in BA Maths. She then went on to the Yale University to pursue post-graduate studies in economics.

== Career and honours ==
After completing her studies, Jhabvala joined SEWA in Ahmedabad, in 1977 as an organiser. She worked first with the women workers stitching quilts in the Muslim area of Ahmedabad where she was instrumental in forming the first Cooperative in SEWA. Her main work was organising women into SEWA as a trade union. In 1981, she was elected Secretary of SEWA under the leadership of Ela Bhatt and organised beedi workers, agricultural workers, garment workers, street vendors and many others to bargain for higher income, better working conditions, space to work and social security. She was active in fostering the growth of SEWA across India, taking the experiences of the organisation to States like Madhya Pradesh and Bihar and most recently to Uttarakhand and West Bengal.

Jhabvala was instrumental in forming SEWA Bharat, a National Federation of SEWAs now in 17 States of India. In 1995, she became the National Coordinator of SEWA and started the national office in Delhi.

When the women members of SEWA began expressing the need for basic infrastructure and housing, she was one of the founders of the Mahila Housing SEWA Trust. In 2002 she became the Chair of SEWA Bank and helped to increase finance for poor women in many parts of the country.

She has been active at the international level, representing SEWA at the International Labour Organization (ILO) in 1995 and 1996 during the discussion on Convention for Home Workers; and subsequently in 2002 during the Resolution on the Informal Economy. At the South Asia level she was instrumental in forming HomeNet South Asia, bringing together organisations in India, Pakistan. Bangladesh, Nepal, Sri Lanka and Bhutan working with women home-based workers. She is presently the Chair of HomeNet South Asia. She is one of the founders and present Chair of WIEGO (Women in Informal Employment: Globalizing and Organizing) and has been active in the formation of international networks for women workers in the informal economy.

In addition to organising women into trade unions and co-operatives she has been interested and involved in policy issues of poor women and of the informal economy. She has been active in many Government committees and task forces which have formulated policies ranging from National Policy for Street Vendors, to the Law for Social Security of Unorganised Workers, to policies for unorganised workers in various States. She has written widely on these issues in journals and newspapers and has co-authored seven books.

== Personal life ==
She is married to Harish Khare. The couple have a son.

== Positions held (selected) ==
=== In the SEWA family of organisations ===
- Chairperson, SEWA Grih Rin Limited (SEWA housing finance company) (2014–present).
- Chairperson, SEWA Bank (2002–2008) & Board member (2009–2017)
- National Co-ordinator, SEWA (1995–2017)
- Chairperson, SEWA Bharat (All India SEWA) (2001–present)
- Executive Trustee, Mahila Housing SEWA Trust (1994–present)
- Secretary, SEWA (1981–1995)

=== In international organisations (selected) ===
- Member, UN Secretary General's High Level Panel on Women's Economic Empowerment in 2016-2017
- Chairperson, WIEGO (Women in Informal Employment: Globalizing and Organizing) (2009–2020)
- Chairperson, HomeNet South Asia (2007–present)

=== In government (selected) ===
- Member, Steering Committee, Working Group on Urban poverty, slum and service delivery system in the context of formulation of the 12th five-year plan (2012–2017) under Ministry of Housing and Urban Poverty Alleviation, Government of India.
- Member, Expert Group to recommend the detailed methodology for Identification of Families living Below Poverty Line in the Urban Areas, Planning Commission, (2010–2014)
- Member, Task Force on Affordable Housing, Ministry of Housing and Poverty Alleviation (2008)
- Member, Prime Minister's National Skill Development Council. (2009–2014)
- Chairperson, Task Force on Workers in Unorganised Sector, Government of Madhya Pradesh. (2001–2002)
- Member, Task Force on National Policy for Street Vendors. (2002–2003)
- Chairperson, Group on Women workers and Child labour, National Commission on Labour, Government of India (2000)

=== Other ===
- Member Council, Integrated Research for Action and Development (IRADe)(2015–Present )
- Member, India Senior Energy Advisory Council (ISEAC), Sponsored by Shell Company (2014–2016)
- Chancellor, Gandhigram Rural University (2012–2017)
- Board member, Invest India Micro Pensions (a company for pension for the poor) (2006–2014)
- Board member, Institute for Human Development. New Delhi (2006–2016)
- Board member, India Development Foundation, Gurgaon (2010–2012)
- Board member, Indian Institute for Human Settlements (2010–present)

== Awards ==
- Lifetime Achievement Award 2017, awarded by Federation of Indian Chambers of Commerce and Industries Ladies Organisation, 2017
- "Women of the Year" Award for her commendable contribution in public service, awarded by Radio One, 2014
- India Today Woman in Public Service, awarded by India Today Group, 2013
- Outstanding Work in Social Service, awarded by Vineet Gupta Memorial Trust, 1991
- Padma Shri, awarded by Government of India, 1990
- Outstanding Social Worker, awarded by Federation of Indian Chambers of Commerce and Industries Ladies Organisation, 1990
- Award for Outstanding Young Person, Given by Jaycees Karnavati, 1984
- National Science Talent Scholarship Awarded for Excellence in Science, 1969–1972

== Publications ==
=== 1. Books ===
- Basic Income : A Transformative Policy for India: Co-edited by Sarath Davala, Soumya Kapoor Mehta & Guy Standing, Bloomsbury Publication, 2015 ISBN 978-1-47258-310-9
- The Idea of Work: Co-authored with Ela Bhatt, Indian Academy For Self Employed Women, 2012.
- Social Income and Insecurity: A Study in Gujarat: Co-authored with Guy Standing, Jeemol Unni, and Uma Rani. Routledge, 2010. ISBN 978-0-41558-574-3
- Empowering Women in an Insecure World: Joining SEWA Makes a Difference: Co-authored with Sapna Desai and Jignasa Dave. SEWA Academy, 2010.
- Membership-Based Organization of the Poor: Co-edited with Martha Chen, Ravi Kanbur and Carol Richards. Routledge, 2007. ISBN 978-0-41577-073-6
- Women, Work and Poverty: Co-authored by Martha Chen, Joann Vanek, Francie Lund, James Heinz, with Renana Jhabvala and Christine Bonner. UNIFEM, New York, 2005. ISBN 978-1-93282-726-2
- Informal Economy Centrestage: New Structures of Employment: Co-edited with Ratna M. Sudarshan and Jeemol Unni. Sage Publications, New Delhi, 2003. ISBN 978-0-76199-710-8
- The Unorganised Sector: Work Security and Social Protection: Co-edited with R.K.A. Subrahmanya. Sage Publications, New Delhi, 2000. ISBN 978-0-76199-419-0
- Speaking Out: Women's Economic Empowerment in South Asia: Co-edited with Martha Chen and Marilyn Carr. IT Publications, 1996. ISBN 978-1-85339-382-2

=== 2. Selected articles in journals ===
- "Why basic income seems to be the best bet in times of Covid-19" by The Financial Express in June 2020.
- "Bhukh ki Andekhi Chhaviya" in Hindustan in June 2020.
- "Women: The Invisible Face of Hunger* an analysis by Hindustan Times in May 2020.
- "Give all families, irrespective of ration cards, free food for three months" in Times of India in May 2020.
- Basic income can transform women's lives (Beyond Trafficking & Slavery) "Opendemocracy.net" September 2019.
- "Basic Income should have maximum inclusion", Governance Now, February 2017.
- "There Are No Brick-and-Mortar Banks in a Radius of Even Ten Kilometers: Renana Jhabvala on Demonetisation and the Rural Economy", The Caravan, November 2016
- "India's time for unconditional cash transfers – we need to move towards a basic income regime, but cautiously, so that the vulnerable population does not suffer" in The Financial Express, May 2016
- "Cash gets stuck in that last mile – Banks need to focus on getting the banking correspondent model right" in The Financial Express, December 2015
- "Column: Empowering women through cash transfers – Unconditional cash transfers could transform the lives of women and make them more assertive" (with Dr. Guy Standing) in The Financial Express, May 2015
- "No conditions apply" in The Indian Express, December 2014
- "Let's use CSR to strengthen people's sector" in Governance Now, May 2014
- "The unaccounted" in The Indian Express, 2014
- "Women Home-Based Workers Creating Ties Across South Asian Countries: Experience of SEWA and Homenet" (with Donna Doane) in SAARC Journal on Human Resource Development, Vol. 7, No. 1, December 2011.
- "Clogged Pipes and Bureaucratic Blinkers" (with Guy Standing) in Economic and Political Weekly, Vol. XLV, Nos. 26 & 27, 2010.
- "Social Protection for Women Workers in the Informal Economy" (with Shalini Sinha) in Comparative Labour Law & Policy Journal, Vol. 27, No. 2, Winter 2006.
- "The Idea of Work" (with Ela Bhatt) in Economic and Political Weekly, Vol. XXXIX, No. 48, 2004.
- "Indian Women Use Video to Spark Collective Action" in Communication for Change, 2003.
- "New Forms of Workers' Organisations: Towards A System of Representation and Voice" in The Indian Journal of Labour Economics, Vol. 46, No. 2, April–June 2003.
- "Liberalisation and the Woman Worker" (with Shalini Sinha) in Economic and Political Weekly, 25 May 2002.
- "Humanitarian Trade Unionist: Jhabvala's Pioneering Efforts for Workers' Rights" in Manushi, Issue 127, November–December 2001.
- "In the Wake of a Quake: SEWA's Relief Efforts in Kutch" in Manushi, Issue 122.
- "Social Security for Women Workers in the Unorganised Sector," (with Shalini Sinha) in The Indian Journal of Labour Economics, October–December 2001 (Conference Issue).
- "Liberalisation and Women" in Seminar, Special Issue on Footloose Labour, November 2000.
- "Roles and Perceptions" in Seminar, Special Issue on Street Vendors, July 2000.
- "Minimum Wages Based on Workers' Needs" in Economic and Political Weekly, Vol. 33, No. 10, 1998.
- "Social Security for the Unorganised Sector" in Economic and Political Weekly, Vol. XXXIII, No. 22, May 1998.
- "A Case Study of Interventions in the Labour Market in Gender, Employment and Health", National Council of Applied Economic Research Publication, 1998.
- "Policies Affecting the Unorganised Sector: Lesson from the SEWA Experience" in Margin, Vol. 30, No.1, NCAER Publication, October–December 1997.
- "Women in the People's Sector: Experiences of SEWA" in Social Welfare, Vol. 44, No. 5-6, August–September 1997.
- "Wages for Unorganised Labour" in Seminar, April 1997.
- "Out of the Shadows: Home-based Workers Organise for International Recognition" (with Jane Tate) in SEEDS, No. 18, 1996.
- "India Can Take the Lead" in Labour File, Vol. 2, No. 4, Centre for Communications, New Delhi, April 1996.
- "Invisible Workers Reach International Heights", Economic and Political Weekly, 9 December 1995.
- "Ahmedabad 2001: Planning for the Poor—A Focus on Self employed Women", by Renana Jhabvala and Usha Jumani, reprint from Nagarlok, Vol. XX, No.4, October–December 1988.
- "Claiming What Is Theirs: Struggle of Vegetable Vendors in Ahmedabad", Manushi, Issue 32, January–February 1986.
- "From the Mills to the Streets: A Study of Retrenchment of Women from the Ahmedabad Textile Mills", Manushi, Issue 26, 1985.
- "Neither A Complete Success Nor A Complete Failure: SEWA Organises "Bidi" Workers", Manushi, Issue 22, May–June 1984.

=== 3. Selected articles in edited volumes ===
- "Globalisation and Economic Reform as Seen from the Ground: SEWA's Experience in India" (with Ravi Kanbur) in Kaushik Basu (ed.) India's Emerging Economy: Performance and Prospects in the 1990s and Beyond, MIT Press, Cambridge, MA. 2004. Also presented as a paper at the Indian Economy Conference, Cornell University, 19–20 April 2002. ISBN 978-0-26202-556-0
- "Globalisation, Liberalisation and Women in the Informal Economy" in Veena Jha (ed.) Trade, Globalisation and Gender—Evidence from South Asia. UNIFEM publication in collaboration with UNDP and UNCTAD, 2003. ISBN 978-0-91291-785-6
- "Women as the Leaders of Development" in Jude Fernando and Alyssa Ayres, Progress, Promise and Partnerships. Asia Society, New York, 1998. Also as a keynote address delivered at the Asia Society Conference, New York, 5 October 1998.
- "Working Women: Myth and Reality—Experiences of a Group of Muslim Women Workers" in Vina Mazumdar (ed.) Women Workers in India. Chanakya Publications for ICSSR, 1990. ISBN 978-8-17001-073-9
- "Poor Women in Urban Areas: Reaching a Vulnerable Group" in Social Dimensions of Urban Poverty in India. National Institute of Urban Affairs, New Delhi, 1999.

=== 4. SEWA Academy publications ===
- Impact of Implementing the CDS through Sangini Childcare and Workers' Co-operative, by Renana Jhabvala, Mirai Chatterjee and Mita Parikh, 1996.
- The World of Work in People's Sector and Its Inherent Strength: SEWA Experience by Renana Jhabvala and Ela Bhatt, 1995.
- Women in the Informal Economy by Renana Jhabvala, 1995.
- "My Home, My Workplace: A Life of Struggle from Security" in Tana Vana: The Warp and Weft of Life, with Karl Osner and Manali Shah) (n.d.).
- The Role of Street Vendors in the Growing Urban Economies (n.d.).
- Wage-based Fixation for Home-based Piece Rate Workers: Technical Study based on a Survey of Workers in Gujarat, India with Rahima Shaikh and SEWA Academy Team, 1995.
- Textiles in the People's Sector: Impact of Global Trading Practices on Women in the Unorganised Textile Sector in India, 1995. Also part of Proceedings of the Regional Seminar on Global Trading Practices and Poverty Alleviation in South Asia: A Gender Perspective, organised by UNIFEM and Swedish International Development Authority (SIDA), New Delhi, 30 January – 1 February 1995.
- "My Life, My Work: A Sociological Study of SEWA's Urban Members," with Namrata Bali, Working Paper, Series II, 1991.
