= Indira Gandhi Prize =

- Awarded for: Outstanding contributions in peace
- Sponsored by: Indira Gandhi Memorial Trust
- Location: New Delhi
- Reward: ₹ 10 million
- First award: 1986

Highlights
- Total awarded: 40
- First winner: Parliamentarians for Global Action
- Latest winner: Graça Machel

The Indira Gandhi Prize, or the Indira Gandhi Peace Prize, also known as Indira Gandhi Prize for Peace, Disarmament and Development, is an annual award accorded by the Indira Gandhi Memorial Trust to individuals or organisations in recognition of creative efforts toward promoting international peace, development and a new international economic order; ensuring that scientific discoveries are used for the larger good of humanity; and enlarging the scope of freedom. The prize carries a cash award of 10 million Indian rupees and a citation. A written work should have been published, in order to be eligible for consideration. The panel constituted by the Indira Gandhi Memorial Trust consists of prominent national and international personalities including previous recipients. The recipients are chosen from a pool of national and international nominees.

== Recipients ==
Indicates a joint award for that year

Year	Recipient	Image	Birth / death	State/organization	Description
1986	Parliamentarians for Global Action	–	(founded 1978)	–	International Organisation of Parliamentarians
1987	Mikhail Gorbachev		(1931–2022)	Soviet Union	Former Soviet Union leader
1988	Gro Harlem Brundtland		(born 1939)	Norway	Former Prime Minister of Norway
1989	UNICEF		(founded 1946)	United Nations	United Nations Children's Emergency Fund
1990	Sam Nujoma		(1929–2025)	Namibia	First president of Namibia
1991	Rajiv Gandhi		(1944–1991)	India	Former Prime Minister of India (posthumous)
1992	Saburo Okita		(1914–1993)	Japan	Japanese economist
1993	Václav Havel		(1936–2011)	Czech Republic	1st president of the Czech Republic
1994	Trevor Huddleston		(1913–1998)	United Kingdom	Anti-Apartheid activist
1995	Olusegun Obasanjo		(born 1937)	Nigeria	12th president of Nigeria
1996	Médecins Sans Frontières		(founded 1971)	France	Voluntary organisation
1997	Jimmy Carter		(1924–2024)	United States	39th president of the United States
1998	Muhammad Yunus		(born 1940)	Bangladesh	Founder of Grameen Bank
1999	M. S. Swaminathan		(1925–2023)	India	Indian agricultural scientist
2000	Mary Robinson		(born 1944)	Ireland	7th president of Ireland
2001	Sadako Ogata		(1927–2019)	Japan	Former United Nations High Commissioner for Refugees
2002	Shridath Ramphal		(1928–2024)	Guyana	2nd Commonwealth Secretary-General
2003	Kofi Annan		(1938–2018)	Ghana	7th United Nations Secretary General
2004	Maha Chakri Sirindhorn		(born 1955)	Thailand	Princess of Thailand
2005	Hamid Karzai		(born 1957)	Afghanistan	12th president of Afghanistan
2006	Wangari Maathai		(1940–2011)	Kenya	Environmental and political activist
2007	Bill & Melinda Gates Foundation		(founded 1994)	United States	Charitable foundation
2008	Mohamed ElBaradei		(born 1942)	Egypt	4th director general of the IAEA
2009	Sheikh Hasina		(born 1947)	Bangladesh	Prime Minister of Bangladesh
2010	Luiz Inácio Lula da Silva		(born 1945)	Brazil	Current President of Brazil
2011	Ela Bhatt		(1933–2022)	India	Founder of SEWA
2012	Ellen Johnson Sirleaf		(born 1938)	Liberia	President of Liberia
2013	Angela Merkel		(born 1954)	Germany	Chancellor of Germany
2014	ISRO		(founded 1969)	India	Indian space agency
2015	UNHCR		(founded 1950	United Nations	United Nations High Commissioner for Refugees
2017	Manmohan Singh		(1932–2024)	India	Former Prime Minister, Finance Minister, and Governor of the Reserve Bank of India
2018	Centre for Science and Environment		(founded 1980)	India	Not-for-profit public interest research and advocacy organisation based in New Delhi, India
2019	David Attenborough		(born 1926)	United Kingdom	English broadcaster and natural historian
2021	Pratham		(founded 1995)	India	Not-for-profit learning organization created to improve the quality of education based in India
2022	Indian Medical Association		(founded 1928)	India	The award was for every doctor, nurse, paramedic, and worker for their service during the COVID-19 pandemic.
2022	Trained Nurses Association of India	–	(founded 1917)	India	The award was for every doctor, nurse, paramedic, and worker for their service during the COVID-19 pandemic.
2023	Ali Abu Awwad		(born 1972)	State of Palestine	Awwad is a peace activist and Maestro Barenboim is an Argentine-born classical pianist.
2023	Daniel Barenboim		(born 1942)	Argentina	Awwad is a peace activist and Maestro Barenboim is an Argentine-born classical pianist.
2024	Michelle Bachelet		(born 1951)	Chile	Former president of Chile, former UN High Commissioner for Human Rights, former executive director of UN Women
2025	Graça Machel		(born 1945)	Mozambique	Politician and humanitarian

== See also ==
- Gandhi Peace Prize
- List of peace activists
