= WIEGO =

Global policy research organization

- Headquarters: Manchester
- Website: wiego.org

Women in Informal Employment: Globalizing and Organizing (WIEGO) is a Manchester-based global research–policy network focused on improving conditions for workers in the informal economy. WIEGO's members include membership-based organizations of workers in the informal economy, researchers and development professionals.

The WIEGO network was founded in 1997 by a group of ten activists, researchers, and development practitioners, following a specialist's meeting on the informal economy in Triangolo lariano, Italy. Among the founders was Professor Martha Chen, a Harvard Lecturer in Public Policy and currently a senior advisor with the network. The founding steering committee chair was Indian civil rights leader Ela Bhatt.

In July 2007, WIEGO was registered as a not-for-profit company limited by guarantee in the UK (WIEGO Ltd.) with a formal Constitution and Articles of Association. In 2011, WIEGO was granted charity status by the Charity Commission for England and Wales (Registered Charity No. 1143510).

In 2023, WIEGO, through its International Coordinator, Sally Roever, was recognized at the Schwab Foundation Social Innovation Awards.

== Mission and goals ==
WIEGO's stated mission: "WIEGO believes all workers should have equal economic opportunities and rights and be able to determine the conditions of their work and lives. WIEGO works to improve the status of the working poor, especially women, in the informal economy through increased organization and representation; improved statistics and research; more inclusive policy processes; and more equitable trade, labour, urban, and social protection policies." Its objectives, as detailed in the Register of Charities, are "to relieve poverty in particular the poverty of the working poor in the informal economy caused by low earnings, high risks, and adverse working environments and conditions associated with the informal economy worldwide (including non-standard or unprotected employment for formal firms)".

== Programmes and activities ==
WIEGO supports working poor women by ensuring they have adequate information, knowledge, and tools, and by enabling them to mobilize around their rights, enhancing their safety and earnings. The network does not set an agenda but rather supports domestic workers, street vendors, waste pickers, garment workers, smallholder farmers, and others in articulating their own demands and participating directly in policy and planning processes.

== Specific research and action ==
WIEGO commissions research that focuses on improving statistics on and analyzing policies related to the working poor who make their living in the informal economy. Membership-based organizations (MBOs) of informal workers are always involved in the identification, prioritization, and design of WIEGO activities.

=== Impact of global recession ===
In 2009 and again in 2010, WIEGO coordinated Global Economic Crisis studies to determine how informal workers were being affected by the global economic downturn. The study was executed by organizations involved in the global Inclusive Cities project, which is funded by the Bill & Melinda Gates Foundation. Two rounds of interviews and focus groups were conducted with 102 home-based workers, 63 street vendors, and 54 waste pickers in 14 cities across Africa, Asia, and Latin America. In 2009, 77% of respondents reported that their incomes had fallen in recent months, while 52% reported a further decrease between mid-2009 and 2010.

Findings from the first study, completed in 2009, are captured in "No Cushion to Fall Back On: The Global Economic Crisis and Informal Workers". Findings from the second study are found in "Coping with Crises: Lingering Recession, Rising Inflation, and the Informal Workforce".

=== Domestic workers' rights ===
From 2009 to 2011, funding from the Government of the Netherlands MDG3 Fund enabled WIEGO to assist domestic workers in their struggle for an international convention to help secure their rights as workers. WIEGO helped establish the International Domestic Workers' Network (IDWN) and provided technical and strategic advice, research, and capacity-building, as well as assisting the IDWN with fundraising. Such practical support allowed domestic workers to represent themselves at the International Labour Conference (ILC) in 2010 and 2011. On June 16, 2011, governments, employers, and workers from around the world adopted the Convention and accompanying Recommendation on Decent Work for Domestic Workers (Convention 189) at the 100th ILC in Geneva, Switzerland.

== Structure ==
WIEGO represents a collaboration between membership-based organizations of workers in the informal economy, support non-governmental organizations, research and statistics institutions, national governments, and international development agencies.

Membership-based organizations of informal workers that are actively involved with WIEGO are asked to become Institutional Members. Individuals from the other two constituencies who are involved with WIEGO can become Individual Members. As of March 2014, the network had 172 Members – 33 Institutional and 139 Individual Members – from 40 countries.

An 11-person Board of Directors governs the WIEGO network. Board members are drawn from WIEGO's three constituencies. The Board has two committees: a Management (or executive) Committee and a Financial Committee.

- Renana Jhabvala, Self Employed Women's Association (SEWA)
- Mirai Chatterjee (Chair), Self Employed Women's Association (SEWA)/India
- Lin Lim Lean, Independent Consultant/Malaysia
- Barbo Budin, Gender Equality and Projects Officer at the IUF
- William Steel, University of Ghana/Ghana
- Debra Davis
- Luciana Fukimoto Itikawa, Institute of Advanced Studies/ University of Sao Paulo
- Patrick Ndlovu, Asiye eTafuleni
- Uma Rani, International Labour Organisation, India
- Elizabeth Tang, International Domestic Workers Federation
- Gabriela Calandria, StreetNet International/AFFE, Uruguay

== Key funders ==
- The Bill and Melinda Gates Foundation
- Department for International Development (DFID)
- The Ford Foundation
- The Hewlett Foundation
- Government of the Netherlands, MDG3 Fund
- International Development Research Centre (IDRC)
- Swedish International Development Cooperation Agency (Sida)
