= Reema Nanavaty =

Indian social worker

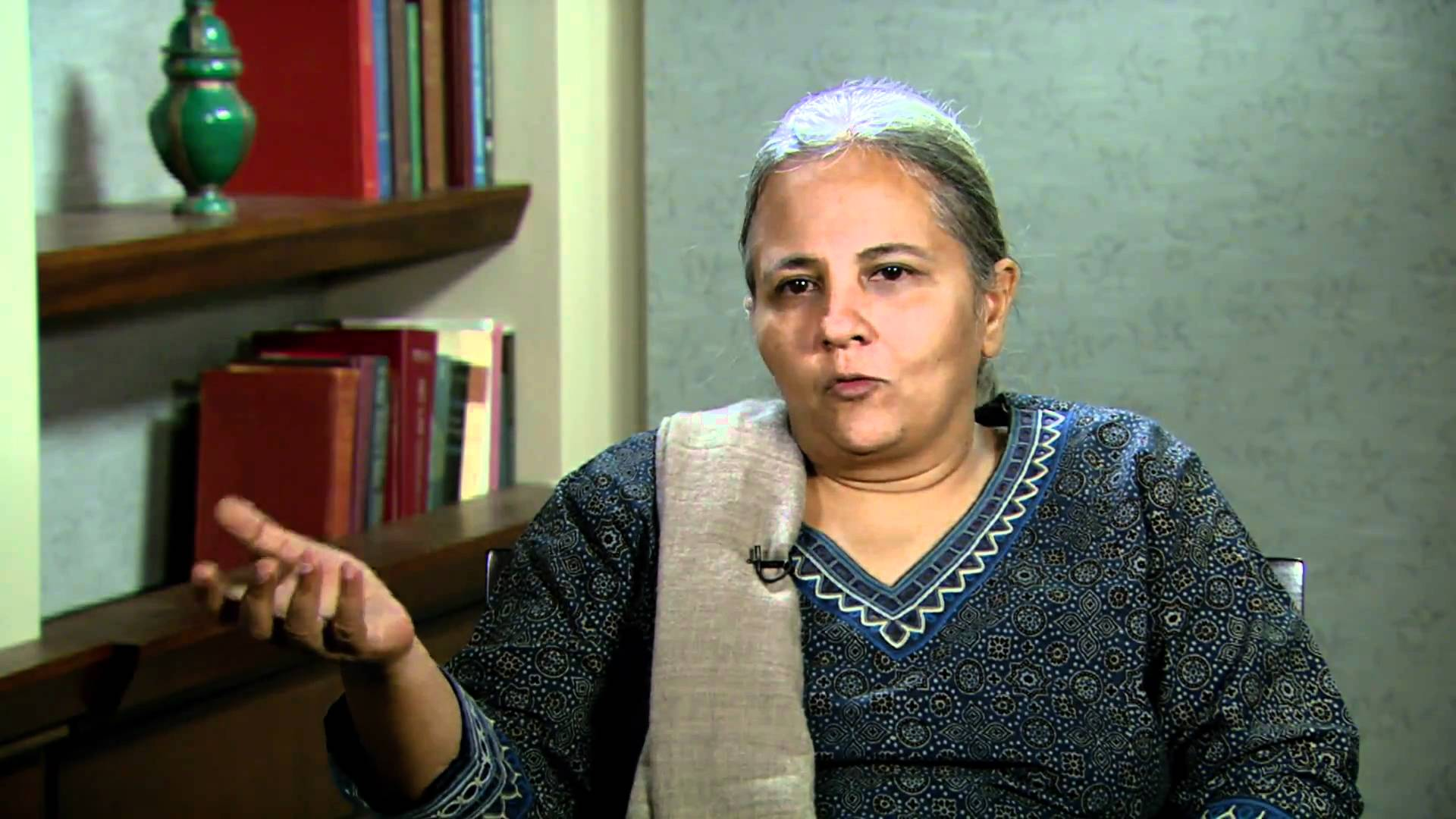
- Born: 22 May 1964 (age 62); Ahmedabad, Gujarat, India
- Resting place: Ahmedabad
- Occupation: Social worker
- Spouse: Mihir Bhatt
- Children: Two
- Awards: Padma Shri

Reema Nanavaty is an Indian developmental worker based in Ahmedabad, India. She has been active for three decades in organising women into co-operative organisations, enterprises and trade unions in India. She is the director of SEWA (Self-Employed Women's Association of India) and is credited for building women's livelihoods and enterprises within eighteen states in India as well as in neighbouring countries such as Afghanistan, Sri Lanka, Nepal and Bhutan.

She was honoured by the Government of India, in 2013, with the Padma Shri, the fourth highest civilian award, for her contributions to the field of social service.

== Biography ==
If the villagers of Gokhantar, in the arid deserts of western Gujarat state have a supply of sweet water today, they have their womenfolk to thank for it says Reema Nanavaty.

Reema Nanavaty was born in Ahmedabad, to Bharati Nanavaty and Rameshchandra Nanavaty, in the Indian state of Gujarat on 22 May 1964. Her paternal grandfather Mahendrarai Nanavaty was a well known labour lawyer who worked for the Textile Labour Association or TLA (also known as Majoor Mahajan Sangh) founded by Mahatma Gandhi, from which SEWA originates. Her maternal grandfather, Shyamprasad Vasavada was the General Secretary of the Textile Labour Association, a labour leader and Gandhian. He worked closely with Anasuya Sarabhai – on whom Reema’s family curated an exhibition – “Motaben” in 2012. Nanavaty is the daughter-in-law Ela Bhatt, a renowned women's empowerment activist, Padma Bhushan winner and the founder of SEWA.

Nanavaty was raised and schooled in Ahmedabad. She pursued a master's in microbiology with Medical Laboratory Technician training and graduated in Science from the Gujarat University. Opting for a career of civil service, she passed the civil services examination (IAS). However, her stay there lasted only one year as she quit the service to take up full-time social service. The Training/Deferral Phase: In her extensive personal profile interview with the Business Standard, she clarifies that right when she was packed and about to leave for her formal IAS training academy, she received a surprise interview call and subsequent offer from SEWA to handle drought relief work.The "One Year" Timeline: While she physically chose to work on the ground with SEWA rather than undergo her civil services training modules, the paperwork to process a formal resignation from a central government service like the IAS takes months to conclude. Officially, she spent roughly a calendar year from the time of selection before her formal resignation from government records was finalized.

In 1985 she joined the rural wing of SEWA Self-Employed Women's Association of India, an NGO founded by Ela Bhatt, a Gandhian and social worker. She developed a regional rural water supply scheme into an integrated water project. She stayed on with SEWA and expanded the project into an on-going Women, Water and Work campaign of 40000 women, making women central to water decisions in the process. In 1999, she was elected as the General Secretary of SEWA. Since then, she has expanded SEWA membership to 530,000 making SEWA the single largest union of informal sector workers in India. It was under her leadership, SEWA started self-help groups and a retail distribution network, Rudi, to take the goods produced by SEWA sisters to 40000 households.

In 2001, Reema Nanavaty launched Jeevika project, in association with the Government of Gujarat and International Fund for Agricultural Development (IFAD), an initiative to bring relief to the 2001 Gujarat earthquake victims and their families. A year later, she started Shanta, a relief programme to aid the 2002 Gujarat riots victims. She has taken SEWA out of Gujarat and the activities of the organization, now, spans across the country from Jammu and Kashmir to Assam. They are also involved in war torn Afghanistan, Bhutan and Sri Lanka.

Reema is currently member of the Advisory Council on Gender of the World Bank Group. She was also invited as a member of International Labor Organization’s High Level Global Commission on Future of Work. She was the only commissioner representing the informal sector workers, self-employed workers and the rural workers union in the entire commission. She has also been invited as a member of the UN High-level Dialogue`s Technical Working Group on Energy Action to Advance Other SDGs.

== Personal life ==
She is married to Mihir Bhatt, an Architect and Urban Planner and Founder of All India Disaster Mitigation Institute. They have two sons Somnath and Rameshwar Bhatt.

== Awards ==
- Agriculture Leadership Award in 2021, Agriculture Today
- FICCI Water Awards in 2016
- ITUC Dorje Khatri Award in 2016
- Innovating – For a Better Tomorrow Award in 2014, CNN – IBN
- Social Innovator Award in 2014, Indians for Collective Action
- First Jacques Diouf Award on Global Food Security in 2013, Food and Agriculture Organisation (FAO)
- Padma Shri Award in 2013, Government of India
- Designomics Awards in 2011, Bloomberg UTV, World Brand Congress and VGC
- Sankalp NABARD Award in 2009
- Kamladevi Chattopadhyay Award given by the Government of India.

== See also ==
- Self-Employed Women's Association of India
- Ela Bhatt
