= Harish Khare =

Indian journalist

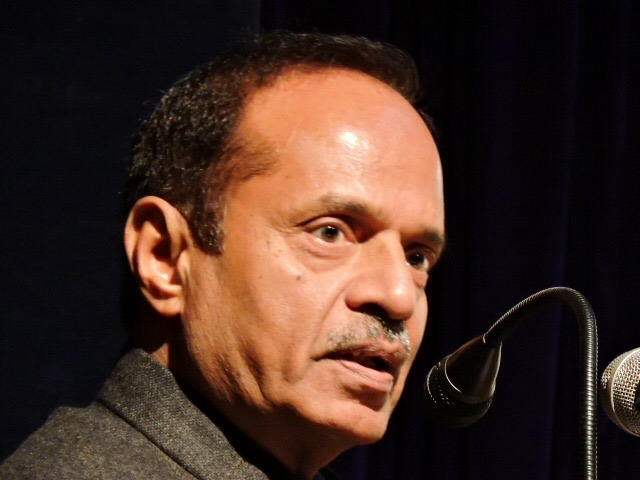

Media Advisor to the Prime Minister of India
- In office 2009–2012

Personal details
- Domestic partner(s): Renana Jhabvala, a social worker
- Occupation: Journalist

Harish Khare is an Indian journalist. He served as the Media Advisor to the Prime Minister's Office from June 2009 to January 2012. On 19 January 2012 he resigned from his post. Khare has worked as Resident Editor and chief of bureau with The Hindu in New Delhi, India. On 14 November 2012, he was awarded the Jawarharlal Nehru Fellowship for his project "Governing India in the 21st Century: Reinventing Nehruvian Executive Leadership Mode." He was the Editor-in-Chief of the Tribune Group of publications from 1 June 2015 until 15 March 2018.

In July 2011, he "strongly" refuted a claim by a columnist that he had been hosted by Ghulam Nabi Fai. On 19 January 2012, he resigned as the media advisor to the Prime Minister and was replaced by Pankaj Pachauri. There was no "official word" about why the change occurred. On 15 March 2018, he resigned as editor of The Tribune, after an investigative story on a data breach was seen as an "embarrassment" to the Modi government.

Khare is married to the social worker Renana Jhabvala.

Preceded by K.K. Katyal	Chief of the National Bureau; The Hindu; 2000-2009	Succeeded by Siddharth Varadarajan
Preceded by Deepak Sandhu; Sanjaya Baru	Media Adviser; Prime Minister's Office; 2009-2012	Succeeded by Pankaj Pachauri
