= Citizen Effect =

Nonprofit organization

- Founded: 2009
- Founder: Dan Morrison
- Type: Non-governmental organization
- Location: Washington, DC, United States
- Region served: 12 countries
- Website: CitizenEffect.org is no longer owned by Citizen Effect

Citizen Effect is a Washington, D.C.–based registered 501(c)(3) nonprofit that provides citizens with the tools they need to support a small-scale philanthropy project. Originally called 1Well, Citizen Effect was founded in 2008 and has completed 100 projects around the world.

== Operations ==
Citizen Effect sponsors small-scale projects related to clean energy, education, food security, health, water and sanitation. People interested in funding a project can browse current projects on Citizen Effect’s website and sign up. After choosing a project, people raise money from their social networks, receiving fundraising advice from Citizen Effect’s staff. When projects are fully funded, Citizen Effect and its field partners provide regular project updates.

== History ==
Dan Morrison, Citizen Effect’s Founder and CEO, was working as a management consultant when he was invited to visit the Self-Employed Women's Association of India in 2008. During his trip, he learned about the plight of Vachharajpur, a small village in Gujarat that lacked safe drinking water. Morrison raised $5,000 from his friends and family in the US to build a well in Vacharajpur, inspiring him to found an organization dedicated to connecting everyday citizens to at-risk communities across the world. Start-up money for Citizen Effect was provided by Google CEO Eric Schmidt.
