= Shenggen Fan =

Chinese agronomist

Shenggen Fan (樊胜根)

Director General of the International Food Policy Research Institute
- In office December 2009 – December 2019
- Preceded by: Joachim von Braun
- Succeeded by: Jo Swinnen
- Website: www.ifpri.org

Academic background
- Education: University of Minnesota

Academic work
- Discipline: Agricultural economics
- Notable ideas: Impact of Investment in Agricultural Research on Development
- Awards: Distinguished Leadership Award for Internationals (University of Minnesota); Outstanding Young Scholar award (National Science Foundation of China)
- Website: Information at IDEAS / RePEc

Shenggen Fan (樊胜根) is a Chinese agricultural economist and professor at China Agricultural University. He served as director general of the International Food Policy Research Institute (IFPRI) from 2009 to 2019. He is a Chair Professor at China Agricultural University (CAU) and Dean of the Academy of Global Food Economics and Policy (AGFEP).

His research focuses on agricultural and rural development, public investment, poverty reduction, food security, nutrition, and food systems policy. He is a Fellow of the Agricultural and Applied Economics Association and an honorary life member of the International Association of Agricultural Economists.

== Education ==
He earned his bachelor's and master's degrees from Nanjing Agricultural University in China. In 1989, he graduated from the College of Agricultural, Food, and Environmental Sciences of the University of Minnesota with a Ph.D. in applied economics. His research was the first to separately measure the effects of the green revolution promoted by international agricultural research, technological change, and institutional changes in China, on the productivity of the Chinese agricultural system.

== Career ==
After completing his doctorate, Fan worked as a postdoctoral fellow and associate research officer at the International Service for National Agricultural Research in The Hague, Netherlands, from 1990 to 1992. He then joined the University of Arkansas, Fayetteville, as a research economist in its Department of Agricultural Economics and Rural Sociology, serving from 1992 to 1995.

Fan joined the International Food Policy Research Institute (IFPRI) in 1995 as a research fellow. He became a senior research fellow in 1998 and subsequently led the institute's work on public investment. From 2005 to 2009, he directed IFPRI's Development Strategy and Governance Division. In December 2009, he became the institute's director general, a position he held until December 2019.

His work involved research and policy advice for governments and development institutions in Asia and Africa, including on public investment and rural development.

In January 2020, Fan joined China Agricultural University as a chair professor. He also became dean of the university's Academy of Global Food Economics and Policy (AGFEP), where his work addresses agricultural development strategies, food policy, public investment, and public policy in developing countries.

== Research ==
Fan's research focuses on agricultural economics, rural development, food security and agrifood systems. His work examines the effects of public investment, agricultural research, technology and infrastructure on agricultural productivity, economic growth and poverty reduction in developing countries.

His research also examines the role of public expenditure in agricultural development. He has studied government investment in agricultural research, irrigation, rural roads and infrastructure, assessing their effects on productivity, rural incomes and poverty. His work has also considered how public resources can be allocated to improve agricultural performance and living standards in rural areas.

In a 2000 study with Peter Hazell and Sukhadeo Thorat, Fan examined the effects of public expenditure on agricultural growth and rural poverty in India and China. Using Indian state-level data from 1970 to 1993, the study identified rural roads and agricultural research as important contributors to agricultural productivity and poverty reduction. His related research examined the benefits of public investment in less-favoured and rain-fed regions.

Fan also studied the contribution of agricultural research to technological development and poverty alleviation. In a comparative study of rice research in India and China, he and his co-authors assessed the economic benefits of improved rice varieties and the contributions of national research institutions and the International Rice Research Institute.

His other studies examined the effects of rural education, electricity, irrigation and transport infrastructure on agricultural productivity and household welfare. This research addressed differences in public investment outcomes across countries and regions and their implications for development policy.

In later work, Fan turned increasingly to the broader economic and policy dimensions of food systems. In a 2021 article, Economics in Food Systems Transformation, published in Nature Food, he discussed the role of economic analysis in food-system reform and the participation of emerging economies in international food policy. His subsequent research has addressed food security, nutrition, sustainable diets, agricultural subsidies, food waste and the environmental effects of food production and consumption.

== Other activities ==
He served on the board of the Consultative Group on International Agricultural Research (CGIAR) System and has been associated with organizations including the Global Development Network and the University of Central Asia. He also serves as advisor for World Food Prize Council of Advisors, the Oxford Martin School's advisory council, and the Global Panel on Agriculture and Food Systems for Nutrition.

Fan has participated in Scaling Up Nutrition Movement and Champions 12.3, which works toward the United Nations Sustainable Development Goals. He has also advised governments and international organizations on agricultural development, food security and nutrition policy.

== Awards and honors ==
- 2005: Outstanding Young Scholar Award, National Natural Science Foundation of China.
- 2006: Outstanding Alumni Award, Department of Applied Economics, University of Minnesota
- Distinguished Leadership Award for Internationals, University of Minnesota.
- 2011: Doctor of Science, honoris causa, Panjab University, India.
- 2012: Knight of the Order of Agricultural Merit, awarded by the French Republic
- Fellowship of the International Academy of Food Science and Technology.
- 2014: Hunger Hero Award, World Food Programme.
- 2017: Fudan Management Excellence Award.
- 2018: Honorary life membership of the International Association of Agricultural Economists.
- 2020: Fellow of the Agricultural and Applied Economics Association
- M. S. Swaminathan Award for Leadership in Agriculture.

== Publications ==
Fan has published 32 peer-reviewed journal articles, which were cited over 250 times.

He has also edited or (co-)authored 7 books:

- Fan, Shenggen; Zhang, Linxiu (2003). WTO and rural public investment strategy in China [in Chinese]. Beijing: China Agricultural Publishing House.
- Fan, Shenggen; Zhong, Funing; Wen, Simei (2005). Globalization and small farm-holders. Beijing: China Agricultural Publishing House.
- Fan, Shenggen; Chan-Kang, Connie (2006). Road development, economic growth, and poverty reduction [in Chinese]. Beijing: China Agricultural Publishing House.
- Fan, Shenggen; Gulati, Ashok (2007). The dragon and the elephant : Agricultural and rural reforms in China and India. Baltimore, Maryland: Johns Hopkins University Press.
- Fan, Shenggen (2008). Public expenditures, growth, and poverty in developing countries: Lessons from developing countries. Baltimore, Maryland: Johns Hopkins University Press.
- Fan, Shenggen; Kanbur, Ravi; Zhang, Xiaobo (2009). Regional inequality in China: trends, explanations and policy responses. London New York: Routledge. ISBN 9780415775885.
- Fan, Shenggen; Zhang, Xiaobo; de Haan, Arjan (2010). Narratives of Chinese economic reforms: How does China cross the river? Singapore: World Scientific.
