= Ravi Kanbur =

Professor

- Born: Sanjiv M. Ravi Kanbur; 28 August 1954 (age 72)

Academic background
- Education: University of Cambridge; University of Oxford
- Influences: Amartya Sen

Academic work
- Discipline: Development economics, public economics and economic theory
- Institutions: Cornell University
- Awards: Quality of Research Discovery Award, Agricultural & Applied Economics Association (AAEA); Honorary Professor of Economics, University of Warwick
- Website: Information at IDEAS / RePEc

Sanjiv M. Ravi Kanbur (born 28 August 1954), is T.H. Lee Professor of World Affairs, International Professor of Applied Economics, and Professor of Economics at Cornell University. He worked for the World Bank for almost two decades and was the director of the World Development Report.

Kanbur is president of the Human Development and Capability Association (HDCA) from September 2016 to September 2018. He started serving a year as president elect from September 2015.

== Early life ==
Ravi Kanbur is British, he was born in India and brought up in India and England.

== Education ==
Kanbur gained his degree in economics from the Gonville and Caius College, University of Cambridge in 1975. He studied for his masters (1979) and doctorate (1981), also in economics, at Worcester College, University of Oxford. He studied under the Nobel Prize winning economist Amartya Sen and Sen has stated that his association with Kanbur has been beneficial to his writing.

== Resignation as Director of the World Development Report ==
In May 2000, Kanbur resigned as director and lead author of the World Bank's World Development Report. His resignation followed the publication of the initial draft of the 2000/2001 report on the internet. Kanbur's resignation came a year after the resignation of the World Bank's senior vice-president and chief economist, Joseph Stiglitz.

== 2000/2001 Report on the Internet ==
Kanbur's initial draft argued that, "anti-poverty strategies must emphasise 'empowerment' (increasing poor people's capacity to influence state institutions and social norms) and security (minimising the consequences of economic shocks for the poorest) as well as opportunity (access to assets)." The final version of the report still contained the three central pillars of: (a) empowerment, (b) security and (c) opportunity, however the order was changed to (a) opportunity (with emphasis given to market-driven economic growth and liberalisation as ways of reducing poverty), (b) empowerment and, (c) security. The World Bank denied that US treasury secretary Larry Summers or anyone else had influenced the report to make it less radical.

== Awards ==
- 1991 Quality of Research Discovery Award from the Agricultural & Applied Economics Association (AAEA) for the paper How serious is the neglect of intrahousehold inequality?
- 1994 Honorary Professor of Economics, University of Warwick

== Personal life ==
Kanbur is married to Margaret Grieco, Professor of Transport and Society at Edinburgh Napier University, Scotland.

== Bibliography ==
=== Books ===
- Kanbur, Ravi (2003). Q-squared, combining qualitative and quantitative methods in poverty appraisal. Delhi Bangalore: Permanent Black Distributed by Orient Longman. ISBN 9788178240534.
- Kanbur, Ravi; Greenwald, Bruce; Nalebuff, Barry; Richard, Arnott (2003). Economics for an imperfect world: essays in honor of Joseph E. Stiglitz. Cambridge, Massachusetts: MIT Press. ISBN 9780262012058.
- Kanbur, Ravi; Venables, Anthony J. (2005). Spatial inequality and development. Oxford New York: Oxford University Press. ISBN 9780199278633.
- Kanbur, Ravi; Ostrom, Elinor; Guha-Khasnobis, Basudeb (2007). Linking the formal and informal economy: concepts and policies. Oxford: Oxford University Press. ISBN 9780199237296.
- Kanbur, Ravi; Jhabvala, Renana; Chen, Martha; Richards, Carol (2007). Membership-based organizations of the poor: concepts, experience and policy. London New York: Routledge. ISBN 9780415770736.
- Kanbur, Ravi; Kadekodi, Gopal; Rao, Vijayendra (2008). Development in Karnataka: challenges of governance, equity, and empowerment. New Delhi: Academic Foundation. ISBN 9788171886197.
- Kanbur, Ravi; Aryeetey, Ernest (2008). The economy of Ghana: analytical perspectives on stability, growth & poverty. Oxford Accra, Ghana: James Currey Woeli Publishing Services. ISBN 9781847010032.
- Kanbur, Ravi; Basu, Kaushik (2009). Arguments for a better world: essays in honor of Amartya Sen | Volume I: Ethics, welfare, and measurement and Volume II: Society, institutions and development (set). Oxford New York: Oxford University Press. ISBN 9780199239993.

Volume I only - Kanbur, Ravi; Basu, Kaushik (2009). Arguments for a better world: essays in honor of Amartya Sen | Volume I: Ethics, welfare, and measurement. Oxford New York: Oxford University Press. ISBN 9780199239115.
Volume II only - Kanbur, Ravi; Basu, Kaushik (2009). Arguments for a better world: essays in honor of Amartya Sen | Volume II: Society, institutions and development. Oxford New York: Oxford University Press. ISBN 9780199239979.

- Kanbur, Ravi; Svejnar, Jan (2009). Labour markets and economic development. London New York: Routledge. ISBN 9780415777414.
- Kanbur, Ravi; Fan, Shenggen; Zhang, Xiaobo (2009). Regional inequality in China: trends, explanations and policy responses. London New York: Routledge. ISBN 9780415775885.
- Kanbur, Ravi; Hulme, David; Addison, Tony (2009). Poverty dynamics: interdisciplinary perspectives. Oxford New York: Oxford University Press. ISBN 9780199557554.
- Kanbur, Ravi; Beall, Jo; Guha-Khasnobis, Basudeb (2010). Urbanization and development: multidisciplinary perspectives. Oxford New York: Oxford University Press. ISBN 9780199590148.
- Kanbur, Ravi; Spence, Michael (2010). Equity and growth in a globalizing world. Washington, DC: Commission on Growth and Development/World Bank. ISBN 9780821381809.
- Kanbur, Ravi; Rodgers, Dennis; Beall, Jo (2012). Latin American urban development into the twenty first century: towards a renewed perspective on the city. New York: United Nations University. ISBN 9780230371545.
- Kanbur, Ravi; Beall, Jo; Guha-Khasnobis, Basudeb (2012). Urbanization and development in Asia: multidimensional perspectives. New Delhi: Oxford University Press. ISBN 9780198078531.
- Kanbur, Ravi; Kasekende, Louis; Aryeetey, Ernest; Devarajan, Shantayanan (2012). The Oxford companion to the economics of Africa. Oxford New York, New York: Oxford University Press. ISBN 9780199575978.
- Kanbur, Ravi; Dev, S. Mahendra; Galab, S.; Alivelu, G. (2012). Organising poor women: the Andhra Pradesh experience. New Delhi: Academic Foundation in association with Centre for Economic and Social Studies, Hyderabad. ISBN 9788171889389.
- Kanbur, Ravi; Malone, David M.; Currie-Alder, Bruce; Medhora, Rohinton (2014). International development: ideas, experience, and prospects. Oxford New York, New York: Oxford University Press. ISBN 9780199671663.
- Kanbur, Ravi; Kasekende, Louis; Aryeetey, Ernest; Devarajan, Shantayanan (2014). The Oxford companion to the economics of Africa. Oxford New York, New York: Oxford University Press. ISBN 9780198705437.
- Kanbur, Ravi; Fan, Shenggen; Wei, Shang-Jin; Zhang, Xiaobo (2014). The Oxford companion to the economics of China. Oxford: Oxford University Press. ISBN 9780199678204.
- Kanbur, Ravi; Ncube, Mthuli; Bhorat, Haroon; Hirsch, Alan (2014). The Oxford companion to the economics of South Africa. Oxford: Oxford University Press. ISBN 9780199689248.
- Kanbur, Ravi; Ahluwalia, Isher; Mohanty, P. K. Mohanty (2014). Urbanisation in India: challenges, opportunities and the way forward. New Delhi: Sage. ISBN 9788132119593.

=== Chapters in books ===
- Kanbur, Ravi (2000), "Income distribution and development", in Atkinson, A. B.; Bourguignon, F. (eds.), Handbook of income distribution, volume 1, Amsterdam New York: Elvesier, pp. 791–841, ISBN 9780444816313.
- Kanbur, Ravi (2003), "Q-squared?: a commentry on qualitative and quantitative poverty appraisal", in Kanbur, Ravi (ed.), Q-squared, combining qualitative and quantitative methods in poverty appraisal, Delhi Bangalore: Permanent Black Distributed by Orient Longman, pp. 2–27, ISBN 9788178240534.
- Kanbur, Ravi (2004), "On obnoxious markets", in Pattanaik, Prasanta K.; Cullenberg, Stephen (eds.), Globalization, culture, and the limits of the market: essays in economics and philosophy, Themes in Economics, New Delhi New York: Oxford University Press, pp. 39–61, ISBN 9780195664461.
- Kanbur, Ravi (2006), "The economics of international aid", in Kolm, Serge-Christophe; Ythier, Jean Mercier (eds.), Handbook of the economics of giving, altruism and reciprocity: foundations, volume 1, Amsterdam London: Elsevier, ISBN 9780444506979.
- Kanbur, Ravi (2014), "Social protection: consensus and challenges", in Stewart, Frances; Cornia, Giovanni A. (eds.), Towards human development new approaches to macroeconomics and inequality, Oxford, Oxfordshire: Oxford University Press, pp. 86–98, ISBN 9780198706083.
- Kanbur, Ravi (2015), "Mitigating risk: social protection and the rural poor", in International Food Policy Research Institute (IFPRI) (ed.), 2014-2015 Global Food Policy Report (PDF), Washington, D.C.: International Food Policy Research Institute, pp. 33–39. DOI 10.2499/9780896295759 ISBN 9780896295759

=== Journal articles ===
1975–1979

- Kanbur, S. M. (August 1979). "Of risk taking and the personal distribution of income". Journal of Political Economy. 87 (4): 769–797. doi:10.1086/260792. JSTOR 1831007. S2CID 154399788.
- Kanbur, S. M. (October 1979). "Impatience, information and risk taking in a general equilibrium model of occupational choice review of economic studies". Review of Economic Studies. 46 (4): 707–718. doi:10.2307/2297037. JSTOR 2297037.

1980–1984

- Kanbur, S. M. (Winter 1980). "A note on risk taking, entrepreneurship, and Schumpeter". History of Political Economy. 12 (4): 489–498. doi:10.1215/00182702-12-4-489.
- Kanbur, S. M. (April 1981). "Risk taking and taxation: an alternative perspective". Journal of Public Economics. 15 (2): 163–184. doi:10.1016/0047-2727(81)90031-1.
- Kanbur, S. M.; Banerjee, Biswajit (February 1981). "On the specification and estimation of macro rural-urban migration functions: with an application to Indian data". Oxford Bulletin of Economics and Statistics. 43 (1): 7–29. doi:10.1111/j.1468-0084.1981.mp43001002.x. PMID 12264625.
- Kanbur, S. M. Ravi (June 1982). "Increases in risk with kinked payoff functions". Journal of Economic Theory. 27 (1): 219–228. doi:10.1016/0022-0531(82)90024-2.
- Kanbur, S. M. Ravi (November 1983). "Labour supply under uncertainty with piecewise linear tax regimes". Economica. 50 (200): 379–394. doi:10.2307/2554301. JSTOR 2554301.
- Kanbur, S. M. Ravi (November 1984). "How to analyse commodity price stabilisation? A review article". Oxford Economic Papers. 36 (3): 336–358. doi:10.1093/oxfordjournals.oep.a041642.

1985–1989

- Kanbur, S. M. R.; Anand, Sudhir (1985). "Poverty under the Kuznets Process". The Economic Journal. 95 (Supplement: Conference Papers): 42–50. doi:10.2307/2232868. JSTOR 2232868.
- Kanbur, S. M. Ravi; Vines, David (October 1986). "North-South interaction and commod control". Journal of Development Economics. 23 (2): 371–387. doi:10.1016/0304-3878(86)90124-0.
- Kanbur, Ravi; Braverman, Avishay (September 1987). "Urban bias and the political economy of agricultural reform". World Development. 15 (9): 1179–1187. doi:10.1016/0305-750X(87)90186-0.
- Kanbur, S. M. Ravi (December 1987). "Structural adjustment, macroeconomic adjustment and poverty: A methodology for analysis". World Development. 15 (12): 1515–1526. doi:10.1016/0305-750X(87)90234-8.
- Kanbur, Ravi; Stromberg, Jan-Olov (August 1988). "Income transitions and income distribution dominance". Journal of Economic Theory. 45 (2): 408–416. doi:10.1016/0022-0531(88)90278-5.

1990–1994

- Kanbur, Ravi; Haddad, Lawrence (September 1990). "How serious is the neglect of intra-household inequality?" (PDF). The Economic Journal. 100 (402): 866–881. doi:10.2307/2233663. JSTOR 2233663. Pdf version.
- Kanbur, S. M. Ravi; Myles, G. D. (February 1992). "Policy choice and political constraints". European Journal of Political Economy. 8 (1): 1–29. doi:10.1016/0176-2680(92)90055-L.
- Kanbur, S. M. Ravi; Keen, Michael (September 1993). "Jeux sans frontières: tax competition and tax coordination when countries differ in size". The American Economic Review. 83 (4): 877–892. JSTOR 2117583.
- Kanbur, S. M. Ravi; Anand, Sudhir (February 1993). "The Kuznets process and the inequality—development relationship". Journal of Development Economics. 40 (1): 25–52. doi:10.1016/0304-3878(93)90103-T.
- Kanbur, S. M. R.; Anand, Sudhir (June 1993). "Inequality and development a critique". Journal of Development Economics. 41 (1): 19–43. doi:10.1016/0304-3878(93)90035-L.
- Kanbur, Ravi; Haddad, Lawrence (January–March 1993). "The value of intrahousehold survey data for age-based nutritional targeting". Annales d'Économie et de Statistique. 29 (29): 65–81. JSTOR 20075896.
- Kanbur, Ravi; Keen, Michael; Toumala, Matti (May 1994). "Labor supply and targeting in poverty alleviation programs". The World Bank Economic Review. 8 (2): 191–211. doi:10.1093/wber/8.2.191. S2CID 56464236.

1995–1999

- Kanbur, Ravi; Haddad, Lawrence; Bouis, Howarth (August 1995). "Intrahousehold inequality at different welfare levels: energy intake and energy expenditure data from the Philippines". Oxford Bulletin of Economics and Statistics. 57 (3): 389–409. doi:10.1111/j.1468-0084.1995.mp57003007.x.
- Kanbur, Ravi; Grootaert, Christiaan; Oh, Gi-Taik (1997). "The dynamics of welfare gains and losses: An African case study". Journal of Development Studies. 33 (5): 635–657. doi:10.1080/00220389708422487.
- Kanbur, Ravi; Zhang, Xiaobo (December 1999). "Which regional inequality? The evolution of rural–urban and inland–coastal inequality in China from 1983 to 1995" (PDF). Journal of Comparative Economics. 27 (4): 686–701. doi:10.1006/jcec.1999.1612.

2000–2004

- Kanbur, Ravi (June 2001). "Economic policy, distribution and poverty: the nature of disagreements". World Development. 29 (6): 1083–1094. doi:10.1016/S0305-750X(01)00017-1.
- Kanbur, Ravi (March 2002). "Economics, social science and development" (PDF). World Development. 30 (3): 477–486. doi:10.1016/S0305-750X(01)00117-6. hdl:1813/57796.
- Kanbur, Ravi; Pottebaum, David (October 2002). "A note on public goods dependency". Economics Letters. 77 (2): 233–237. doi:10.1016/S0165-1765(02)00126-X.
- Kanbur, Ravi (July–December 2004). "The development of development thinking" (PDF). Journal of Social and Economic Development. 6 (2): 147–158. Archived from the original (PDF) on 22 May 2006.
- Kanbur, Ravi; Pottebaum, David (2004). "Civil war, public goods and the social wealth of nations" (PDF). Oxford Development Studies. 32 (4): 459–484. doi:10.1080/1360081042000293308. hdl:1813/57695. S2CID 15206123.

2005–2009

- Kanbur, Ravi; Zhang, Xiaobo (2005). "Spatial inequality in education and health care in China" (PDF). China Economic Review. 16 (2): 189–204. doi:10.1016/j.chieco.2005.02.002. hdl:1813/58074. S2CID 7513548.
- Kanbur, Ravi (January–June 2005). "Pareto's revenge" (PDF). Journal of Social and Economic Development. 7 (1): 1–11. Archived from the original (PDF) on 22 May 2006.
- Kanbur, Ravi; Venables, Tony (January 2005). "Introduction: Spatial inequality and development". Journal of Economic Geography. 5 (1): 1–2. doi:10.1093/jnlecg/lbh059.
- Kanbur, Ravi; Rapoport, Hillel (January 2005). "Migration selectivity and the evolution of spatial inequality". Journal of Economic Geography. 5 (1): 43–57. doi:10.1093/jnlecg/lbh059.
- Kanbur, Ravi; Zhang, Xiaobo (February 2005). "Fifty years of regional inequality in China: a journey through central planning, reform, and openness". Review of Development Economics. 9 (1): 87–106. doi:10.1111/j.1467-9361.2005.00265.x. hdl:10419/63294. S2CID 10375300.
- Kanbur, Ravi (April 2005). "Journal of Economic Inequality forum". Journal of Economic Inequality. 3 (1): 63. doi:10.1007/s10888-004-7787-5. S2CID 154980958.
- Kanbur, Ravi; Chau, Nancy H. (May 2006). "The race to the bottom, from the bottom". Economica. 73 (290): 193–228. doi:10.1111/j.1468-0335.2006.00483.x. hdl:1813/57900. S2CID 7723220.
- Kanbur, Ravi; Chakravarty, Satya R.; Mukherjee, Diganta (June 2006). "Population growth and poverty measurement" (PDF). Social Choice and Welfare. 26 (3): 471–483. doi:10.1007/s00355-006-0081-7. hdl:1813/57822. S2CID 16803324.
- Kanbur, Ravi; Pirttilä, Jukka; Tuomala, Matti (December 2006). "Non-welfarist optimal taxation and behavioural public economics". Journal of Economic Surveys. 20 (5): 849–868. doi:10.1111/j.1467-6419.2006.00268.x. S2CID 16697162.
- Kanbur, Ravi; Shaffer, Paul (February 2007). "Epistemology, normative theory and poverty analysis: implications for Q-squared in practice" (PDF). World Development. 35 (2): 183–196. doi:10.1016/j.worlddev.2005.10.016. hdl:1813/57937.
- Kanbur, Ravi; Dasgupta, Indraneel (September 2007). "Community and class antagonism" (PDF). Journal of Public Economics. 91 (9): 1816–1842. doi:10.1016/j.jpubeco.2007.03.004. S2CID 13225482.
- Kanbur, Ravi; Mukherjee, Diganta (October 2007). "Premature mortality and poverty measurement". Bulletin of Economic Research. 59 (4): 339–359. doi:10.1111/j.0307-3378.2007.00265.x. hdl:1813/57943. S2CID 12592657.
- Kanbur, Ravi; Ghosh, Suman (January 2008). "Male wages and female welfare: private markets, public goods, and intrahousehold inequality" (PDF). Oxford Economic Papers. 60 (1): 42–56. doi:10.1093/oep/gpm039. hdl:1813/57779.
- Kanbur, Ravi; Pirttilä, Jukka; Tuomala, Matti (June 2008). "Moral hazard, income taxation and prospect theory". The Scandinavian Journal of Economics. 110 (2): 321–337. doi:10.1111/j.1467-9442.2008.00541.x. S2CID 14237373.
- Kanbur, Ravi; Basu, Arnab K.; Chau, Nancy H. (April 2009). "A theory of employment guarantees: contestability, credibility and distributional concerns" (PDF). Journal of Public Economics. 93 (3–4): 482–497. doi:10.1016/j.jpubeco.2008.09.007. hdl:10419/34663. S2CID 8919491.

2010–2014

- Kanbur, Ravi (January 2010). "Macro crises and targeting transfers to the poor". Journal of Globalization and Development. 1 (1). doi:10.2202/1948-1837.1005. hdl:10986/27786. S2CID 8494463.
- Kanbur, Ravi; Basu, Arnab K.; Chau, Nancy H. (March 2010). "Turning a blind eye: costly enforcement, credible commitment and minimum wage laws" (PDF). The Economic Journal. 120 (543): 244–269. doi:10.1111/j.1468-0297.2009.02298.x. JSTOR 27765769. S2CID 16789514.
- Kanbur, Ravi; Varshney, Ashutosh; Beall, Jo (February 2011). "Ethnic diversity and ethnic strife. An interdisciplinary perspective" (PDF). World Development. 39 (2): 147–158. doi:10.1016/j.worlddev.2009.11.034. hdl:1813/57920.
- Kanbur, Ravi; Dasgupta, Indraneel (March 2011). "Does philanthropy reduce inequality?". Journal of Economic Inequality. 9 (1): 1–21. doi:10.1007/s10888-009-9123-6. S2CID 154967107.
- Kanbur, Ravi; Cowell, Frank (September 2011). "Introduction to the symposium on "Inequality: new directions"". Journal of Economic Inequality. 9 (3): 315–318. doi:10.1007/s10888-011-9185-0.
- Kanbur, Ravi; Tuomala, Matti (September 2011). "Charitable conservatism, poverty radicalism and inequality aversion". Journal of Economic Inequality. 9 (3): 417–431. doi:10.1007/s10888-010-9150-3. S2CID 155057258.
- Kanbur, Ravi; Rodgers, Dennis; Beall, Jo (September 2011). "Latin American urban development into the twenty-first century: towards a renewed perspective on the city". The European Journal of Development Research. 23 (4): 550–568. doi:10.1057/ejdr.2011.18. S2CID 145290543.
- Kanbur, Ravi; Švejnar, Jan; Lahiri, Sajal (November 2012). "Informality, illegality and enforcement: introduction". Review of Development Economics. 16 (4): 511. doi:10.1111/rode.12000.
- Kanbur, Ravi; Bhorat, Haroon; Mayet, Natasha (November 2012). "Estimating the causal effect of enforcement on minimum wage compliance: the case of South Africa". Review of Development Economics. 16 (4): 608–623. doi:10.1111/rode.12007. hdl:11427/7291. S2CID 53592077.
- Kanbur, Ravi (June 2012). "Aid to the poor in middle income countries and the future of the International Development Association". Journal of International Commerce, Economics and Policy. 3 (2): 1250008–1250016. doi:10.1142/S1793993312500081. Paper based on Opening Plenary Address to the joint 13th EADI General Conference and DSA Annual Conference, University of York, UK, 20 September 2011.
- Kanbur, Ravi; Bhorat, Haroon; Mayet, Natasha (September 2012). "Minimum wage violation in South Africa" (PDF). International Labour Review. 151 (3): 277–287. doi:10.1111/j.1564-913X.2012.00149.x. hdl:1813/57850.
- Kanbur, Ravi; Chau, Nancy H. (May 2013). "On footloose industries and labor disputes with endogenous information asymmetry". Review of Development Economics. 17 (2): 319–341. doi:10.1111/rode.12034. S2CID 154583720.
- Kanbur, Ravi; Bhorat, Haroon; Mayet, Natasha (June 2013). "A note on measuring the depth of minimum wage violation" (PDF). Labour/Le Travail. 27 (2): 192–197. doi:10.1111/labr.12010. hdl:1813/57831. S2CID 154348206.
- Kanbur, Ravi; Tuomala, Matti (November 2013). "Relativity, inequality, and optimal nonlinear income taxation". International Economic Review. 54 (4): 1199–1217. doi:10.1111/iere.12033. hdl:1813/57817. S2CID 11925265.
- Kanbur, Ravi; Bhorat, Haroon; Mayet, Natasha (December 2013). "The impact of sectoral minimum wage laws on employment, wages, and hours of work in South Africa". IZA Journal of Labor & Development. 2 (1): 1. doi:10.1186/2193-9020-2-1. hdl:10.1186/2193-9020-2-1.
- Kanbur, Ravi; Ronconi, Lucas; Wedenoja, Leigh (December 2013). "Labour law violations in Chile". International Labour Review. 152 (3–4): 431–444. doi:10.1111/j.1564-913X.2013.00187.x.
- Kanbur, Ravi; Zhuang, Juzhong (March 2013). "Urbanization and Inequality in Asia". Asian Development Review. 30 (1): 131–147. doi:10.1162/adev_a_00006. hdl:1813/58085.
- Kanbur, Ravi; Basu, Arnab K.; Chau, Nancy H. (2014). "Contractual dualism, market power and informality". The Economic Journal. 125 (589): 1534–1573. doi:10.1111/ecoj.12222. hdl:10419/52076. S2CID 155495562.
- Kanbur, Ravi; Jäntti, Markus; Nyyssölä, Milla; Pirttilä, Jukka (March 2014). "Poverty and welfare measurement on the basis of prospect theory" (PDF). Review of Income and Wealth. 60 (1): 185–205. doi:10.1111/roiw.12095. hdl:1813/57707. S2CID 9050334.
- Kanbur, Ravi; Ghani, Ejaz; O'Connell, Stephen (April 2014). "Urbanization, gender, and business creation in the informal sector in India". Economic Premise. 141: 1–8.
- Kanbur, Ravi; Keen, Michael (August 2014). "Thresholds, informality, and partitions of compliance". International Tax and Public Finance. 21 (4): 536–559. doi:10.1007/s10797-014-9314-3. S2CID 17605906.
- Kanbur, Ravi; Fiszbein, Ariel; Yemtsov, Ruslan (September 2014). "Social protection and poverty reduction: global patterns and some targets". World Development. 61 (1): 167–177. doi:10.1016/j.worlddev.2014.04.010.
- Kanbur, Ravi; Bhorat, Haroon; Stanwix, Benjamin (October 2014). "Estimating the impact of minimum wages on employment, wages, and non-wage benefits: the case of agriculture in South Africa" (PDF). American Journal of Agricultural Economics. 96 (5): 1402–1419. doi:10.1093/ajae/aau049. hdl:11427/7297. S2CID 17870114.

2015 onwards

- Kanbur, Ravi; Chatterjee, Urmila (2015). "Regulation and non-compliance: magnitudes and patterns for India's factories act". International Labour Review. 154 (3): 393–412. doi:10.1111/j.1564-913X.2015.00027.x.
- Kanbur, Ravi; Keen, Michael (March 2015). "Reducing informality". Finance & Development. 52 (1): 52–54. Pdf.
- Kanbur, Ravi; Wagstaff, Adam (March 2015). "How useful is inequality of opportunity as a policy construct?". Discussion Paper, DP10508.
- Kanbur, Ravi (March 2015). "Informality: causes, consequences and policy responses". Discussion Paper, DP10509.
- Kanbur, Ravi; Bento, Antonio M.; Leard, Benjamin (March 2015). "Designing efficient markets for carbon offsets with distributional constraints". Journal of Environmental Economics and Management. 70: 51–71. Bibcode:2015JEEM...70...51B. doi:10.1016/j.jeem.2014.10.003.
- Kanbur, Ravi; Stiglitz, Joseph E. (April 2015). "Dynastic Inequality, Mobility and Equality of Opportunity". Discussion Paper, DP10542.

=== Media articles ===
- Kanbur, Ravi; Sumner, Andy (23 February 2011). "Why give aid to middle-income countries?". The Guardian.
- Kanbur, Ravi; Sumner, Andy (8 November 2011). "Poor countries or poor people? Development assistance and the new geography of global poverty". VoxEU.org - Centre for Economic Policy Research (CEPR). Archived from the original on 17 March 2013.

=== World Bank working papers ===
- Kanbur, Ravi; Haddad, Lawrence (1989). How serious is the neglect of intrahousehold inequality?. Washington, D.C.: Office of Vice President, Development Economics, The World Bank. OCLC 21337751. Policy Research Working Paper number 296. Pdf version.
- Kanbur, Ravi; Haddad, Lawrence (1990). Are better off households more unequal or less unequal?. Washington, D.C.: Office of Vice President, Development Economics, The World Bank. OCLC 21949065. Policy Research Working Paper number 373.
- Kanbur, Ravi; Haddad, Lawrence (1990). Is there an intra-household Kuznets curve?: some evidence from the Philippines. Washington, D.C.: Office of Vice President, Development Economics, The World Bank. OCLC 793528730. Policy Research Working Paper number 466.
- Kanbur, Ravi; Haddad, Lawrence (1991). Intrahousehold inequality and the theory of targeting. Washington, D.C.: Office of Vice President, Development Economics, The World Bank. OCLC 27188313. Policy Research Working Paper number 789.
- Kanbur, Ravi; Haddad, Lawrence (1991). The value of intra-household survey data for age-based nutritional targeting. Washington, D.C.: Office of Vice President, Development Economics, The World Bank. OCLC 26303032. Policy Research Working Paper number 684.
- Kanbur, S. M. Ravi; Keen, Michael; Toumala, Matti (1991). Optimal non-linear income taxation for the alleviation of income poverty. Washington, D.C.: Office of Vice President, Development Economics, The World Bank. OCLC 62773687. Policy Research Working Paper number 616.
- Kanbur, Ravi; Grootaert, Christiaan (1993). A new regional price index for Côte d'Ivoire using data from the International Comparisons Project. Washington, D.C.: Office of Vice President, Development Economics, The World Bank. OCLC 27864637. Policy Research Working Paper number 1080.
- Kanbur, Ravi (1994). Welfare economics, political economy, and policy reform in Ghana. Washington, D.C.: Ghana Resident Mission, Western Africa Department, The World Bank. OCLC 31699995. Policy Research Working Paper number 1381.

== See also ==
- Feminist economics
- List of feminist economists

Educational offices
Preceded by Henry S. Richardson	President of the Human Development and Capability Association; September 2016 – September 2018; President elect September 2015 – September 2016	Vacant Title next held by successful election candidate.
