= Mirai Chatterjee =

Indian social worker (born 1959)

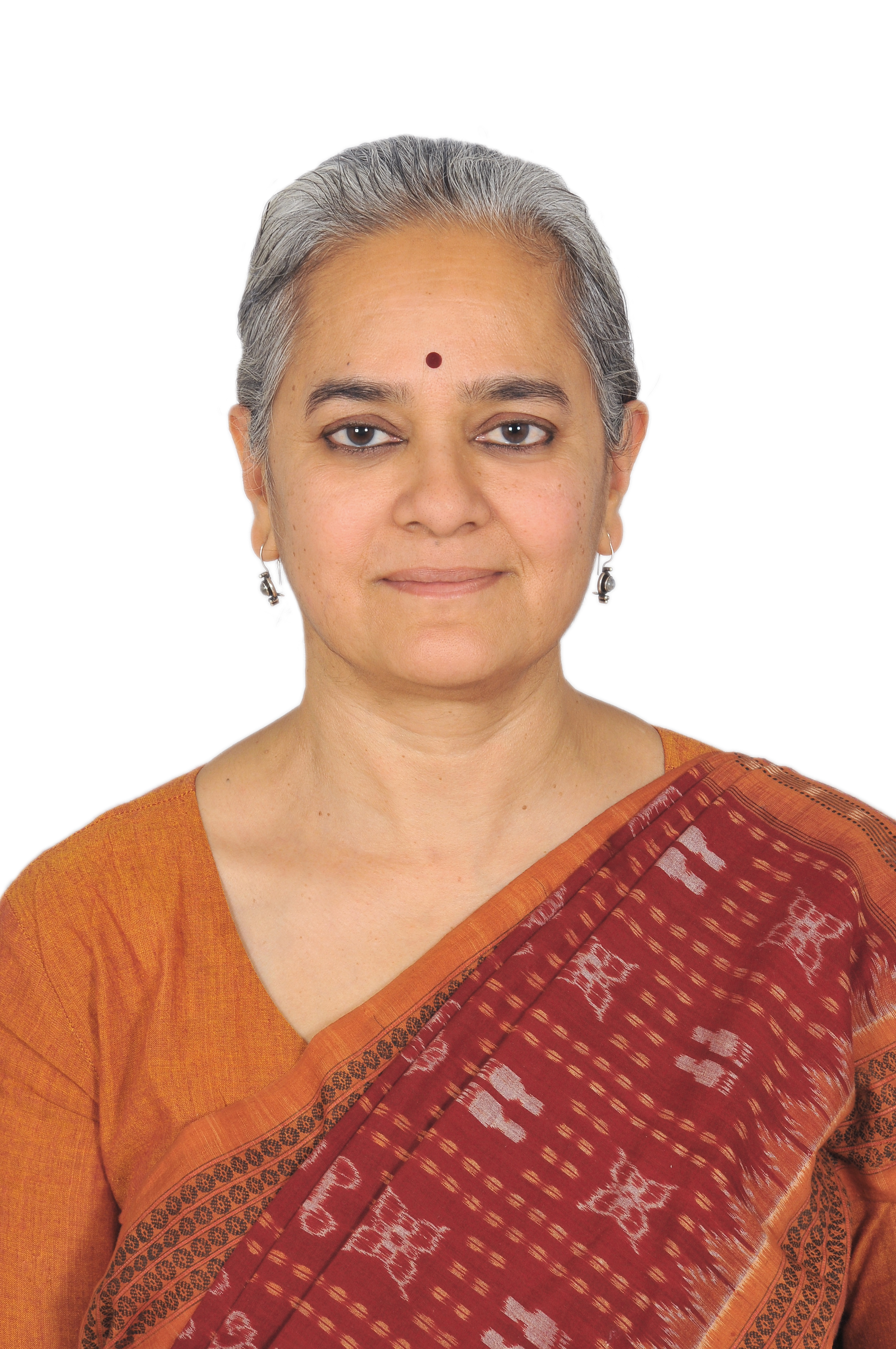
- Born: 17 August 1959 (age 67); India
- Education: The Cathedral & John Connon School, Harvard University, Johns Hopkins Bloomberg School of Public Health
- Occupations: Director, SEWA Social Security
- Organization: Self-Employed Women's Association (SEWA)
- Website: www.sewafederation.org www.sewainsurance.org lokswasthyasewatrust.org

Mirai Chatterjee is a leader of the Self-Employed Women's Association, SEWA (India). She joined SEWA in 1984 and was its General Secretary after its Founder, Ela Bhatt.

Mirai Chatterjee is currently the Director of the Social Security Team at SEWA. She is responsible for SEWA's Health Care, Child Care and Insurance programmes. She was Chairperson of the National Insurance VimoSEWA Cooperative Ltd and the Lok Swasthya Health Cooperative, both of which she is a founder. Both cooperatives are promoted by SEWA. In addition, she is Chairperson of the Gujarat State Women's SEWA Cooperative Federation of 106 primary cooperatives with 300,000 members.

She was also appointed a member of National Advisory Council by the Prime Minister of India in June, 2010.

Ms. Chatterjee serves and has served on the Boards of several organizations in India, including the Friends of Women's World Banking (FWWB), and the Public Health Foundation of India (PHFI). She was advisor to the National Commission for Enterprises in the Unorganized Sector and is in the Advisory Group of the National Health Mission. She was also a Commissioner in the World Health Organization’s Commission on the Social Determinants of Health.

Chatterjee has a B.A. from Harvard University in History and Science and a Masters from Johns Hopkins Bloomberg School of Public Health.

== Personal life ==
Mirai Chatterjee is married to Binoy Acharya, Director UNNATI, an organisation committed to capacity building of grassroots communities. They have three daughters - Kaveri, Ilina and Tara.

== Work experience ==
- 2015—present Chairperson, Gujarat State Women's SEWA Cooperative Federation Ltd.
- 2009—2019 Chairperson, National Insurance VimoSEWA Cooperative Ltd, with 100,000 insured women and their family members in five states of India; currently Board Member
- 1999—present Director, SEWA Social Security Team, involved in organising and managing health care, child care and insurance services for women of the informal economy, all members of the Self Employed Women’s Association, SEWA
- 1999—present Board Member, Lok Swasthya SEWA Health Worker’s Cooperative
- 1999—2010 Chairperson, Lok Swasthya Health Workers’ cooperative, promoted by SEWA. The cooperative is a state-wide organization of grassroots-level health workers
- 1996—1999 General Secretary, Self Employed Women's Association, SEWA; responsible for managing India's largest union of women workers of the informal economy
- 1984—1996 Coordinator, SEWA Health Team, involved in organising health services for and with informal women workers

== Other experience ==
- 2020—present Chairperson, Women in Informal Employment Globalising and Organising (WIEGO), a global network of grassroot practitioners, policy-makers and researchers
- 2020—present Board Member, Schwab Foundation for Social Entrepreneurship
- 2014—present Vice-Chairperson, PRADAN, an NGO working on rural livelihoods
- 2013—present Board Member, Save the Children (India)
- 2010—2014 Member, National Advisory Council (NAC), appointed by the Prime Minister of India
- 2010—2011 Member, High Level Expert Group on Universal Health Coverage, Planning Commission of India
- 2009—present Board Member, Indian Institute of Public Health (Gujarat)
- 2006—present Trustee, National Academy of Self-Employed Women
- 2006—present Trustee, Strishakti Trust, SEWA Bank
- 2006—present Board Member, Video SEWA Communication Cooperative
- 2005—present Board Member, Public Health Foundation of India
- 2005—2008 Commissioner, WHO's Commission on the Social Determinants of Health
- 2005-2008 Board Member, Public Affairs Centre
- 1999—2014 Board Member, Friends of Women's World Banking FWWB, Ahmedabad; an organisation committed to providing micro-finance to grass root women's organisations
- 1998—present Trustee, Mahila SEWA Trust, an organisation committed to the welfare of women workers and a part of the SEWA movement
- 1997—2000 Trustee, National Foundation for India, an organisation committed to strengthening voluntary action for development
- 1988—1990 Board Member, Voluntary Health Association of India (VHAI) a national coalition of community health organisations
- 1988—1989 President, Gujarat Voluntary Health Association (GVHA), regional coalition of health groups working involved in primary health care

== Academic honours ==
- 1983—1985 Aga Khan Foundation Scholarship for 1983 – 85 for graduate degree in public health, Johns Hopkins University, USA
- 1978—1982 Harvard University Scholarship
- 1976—1978 Jawaharlal Nehru Memorial Scholarship to attend the United World College of the Atlantic, Wales

== Other honours and appointments ==
- Named in Apolitical's list of 100 Most Influential People in Gender Policy 2021
- Global Achievement Award for Public Health, Johns Hopkins University School of Public Health, 2014
- Commissioner, Lancet Commission on Re-Imagining Health Care in India
- Commissioner, Lancet Commission on Oral Health
- Honours list of Earth Times Foundation, New York, for contribution to sustainable development
- Appointed as Member, National Advisory Council, June 2010 – May 2014
- Appointed to the National Commission on Enterprises in the Unorganised Sector, 2005
- Appointed as Commissioner, WHO Commission on Social Determinants of Health, March 2005 – 2008
- Member, Action Group on Community Action (AGCA), National Health Mission, Government of India (current)
- Member, India-EU Committee for Civil Society

== Publications ==
=== Books and book chapters ===
1. Mental health and its social determinants: Some experiences of the Self-Employed Women's Association (SEWA) in India, chapter in Oxford Textbook of Public Mental Health, published by Oxford University Press (2018)
2. Social protection in the changing world of work: experiences of informal women workers in India, chapter in Rethinking Informalisation: Poverty, Precarious Jobs and Social Protection, published by Cornell University (2005)

=== Selected journal articles and reports ===
1. Report of the Committee on Standalone Microinsurance Company, Insurance Regulatory and Development Authority of India (August 2020)
2. Universal Health Care: A view from informal women workers in India, Global Social Policy, SAGE Publications (2020)
3. Human resources for health in India, The Lancet (12-18 February 2011)
4. Making health insurance work for the poor: Learning from the Self-Employed Women's Association's (SEWA) community-based health insurance scheme in India
5. Equitable utilisation of Indian community based health insurance scheme among its rural membership: cluster randomised controlled trial (21 June 2007)
6. Decentralised Childcare Services: The SEWA Experience, Economic and Political Weekly (2006)
7. Barriers to accessing benefits in a community-based insurance scheme: lessons learnt from SEWA Insurance, Gujarat (22 December 2005)

=== Media articles ===
1. A lesson in Swaraj from Informal Women Workers, Hindustan Times, October 1, 2020 (https://www.hindustantimes.com/india-news/a-lesson-in-swaraj-from-informal-women-workers/story-9FPfjQex0Nr0fX10ldSScM.html)
2. Lack of social security for women in the informal economy needs to be addressed, May 21, 2020, The Indian Express, https://indianexpress.com/article/opinion/columns/social-security-women-informal-economy-india-mirai-chatterjee-6419938/
3. How Can We Ensure Social Security for Domestic Workers?, 16 April 2019, The Wire, https://thewire.in/labour/domestic-women-workers-informal-sector
4. Informal Workers Are Bearing the Cost of Inadequate Healthcare Investment, February 21, 2019, The Wire, https://thewire.in/health/informal-workers-are-bearing-the-cost-of-inadequate-healthcare-investment
5. As India rethinks labour rules, one item not on the agenda: Childcare facilities for women workers, 31 December 2018, Scroll.In, https://scroll.in/article/905727/as-india-rethinks-labour-rules-one-item-not-on-the-agenda-childcare-facilities-for-women-workers
