= Pankaj Pachauri =

Indian TV anchor and journalist

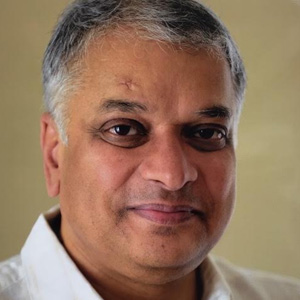
- Born: 24 September 1963 (age 62); New Delhi, India
- Education: St. John's College, Agra; Lal Bahadur Shastri Institute
- Occupations: News Anchor and Managing Editor of NDTV
- Years active: 1997 – present
- Notable credit(s): GoNews, Hum Log, Money Mantra
- Website: www.gonewsindia.com

Pankaj Pachauri (Hindi: पंकज पचौरी, born 24 September 1963) is an Indian TV anchor and journalist. He is the founder and editor-in-chief of Gonews, India's first app based TV News channel.

== Career ==
Pachauri was associated with NDTV for 15 years. He was also associated with other international media houses including the BBC, India Today, The Sunday Observer and tha Patriot newspaper. He has been a member of the National Integration Council.

In January 2012, Pachauri was appointed as the Communications Adviser to the Prime Minister's Office in India under Dr Manmohan Singh, where he designed and executed the PMO's media strategy across various platforms for international events. Pachauri participates in television debates and speaks at institutions like the Indian Institute of Management Calcutta, Kolkata and Indian School of Business, Hyderabad. He has served on the Academic Councils of Indian Institute of Mass Communication New Delhi and Mass Communication and Research Centre, Jamia Milia University, Delhi<https://jmi.ac.in/upload/jamiadocs/JAMIA/2010august17.pdf>. From 2015 to 2016 he was director at the Jaypee Business School, Noida.

== Awards ==
He won 'The Statesman Award for Rural Reporting' in 1989 for his exposé on the practice of female infanticide in Rajasthan. For his contribution to free and fair journalism, he has won many other awards like Indian Telly Award (2009) JayJaivanti Award(2009) Ganesh Shankar Vidyarthi Award (2008) and South Asia Journalism Award (1998)
