= Self Employed Women's Association =

Indian non-governmental organisation

SEWA
- Self-Employed Women's Association of India
- Founded: 1972
- Headquarters: Ahmedabad
- Location: India
- Members: 1,916,676 (2013)
- Key people: Ela Bhatt, Founder
- Affiliations: ITUC
- Website: www.sewa.org

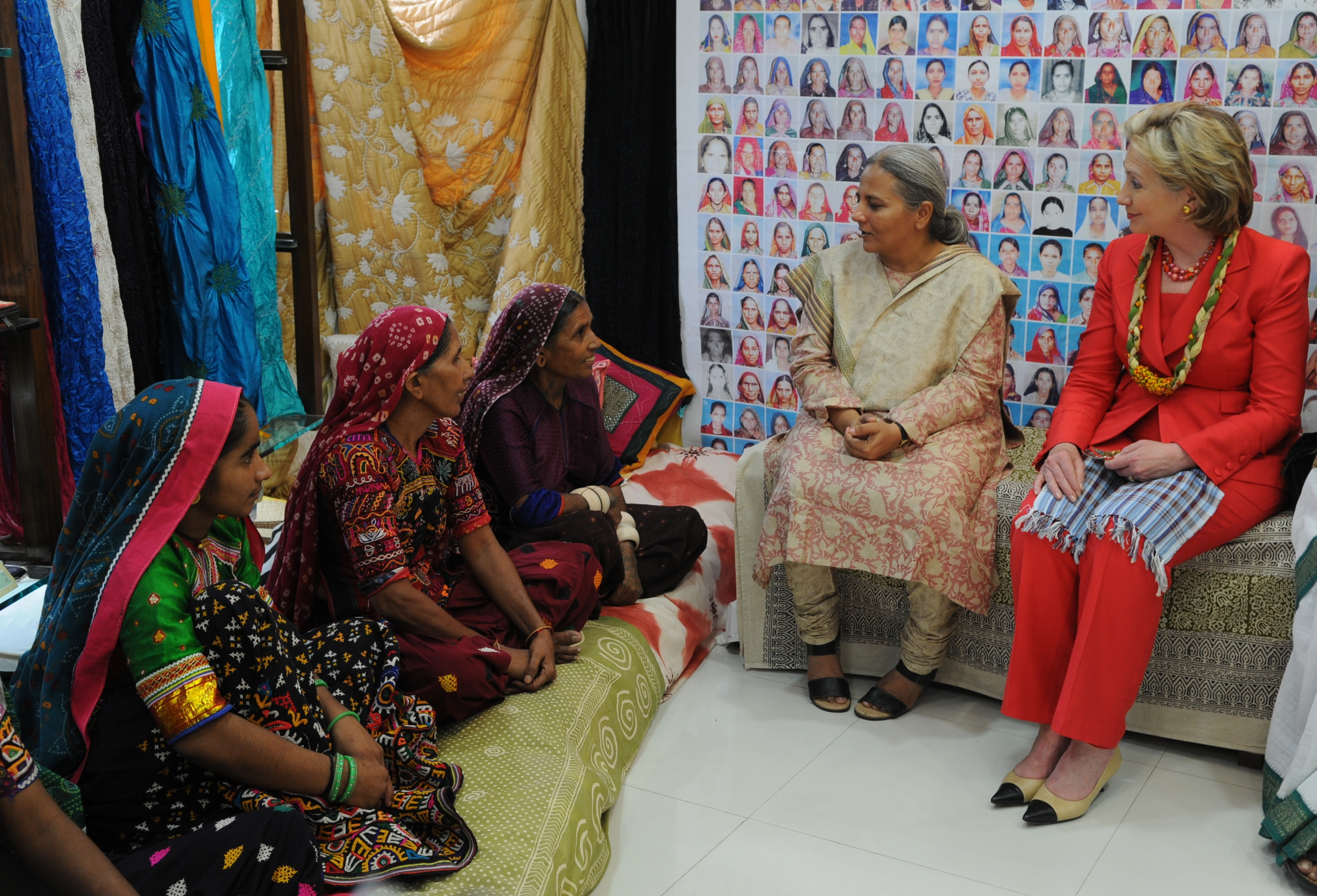
U.S. Secretary of State Hillary Rodham Clinton and SEWA Executive Director Reema Nanavaty listen as women artisans share stories of their involvement with SEWA at the Hansiba Store in Mumbai, India, 18 July 2009.

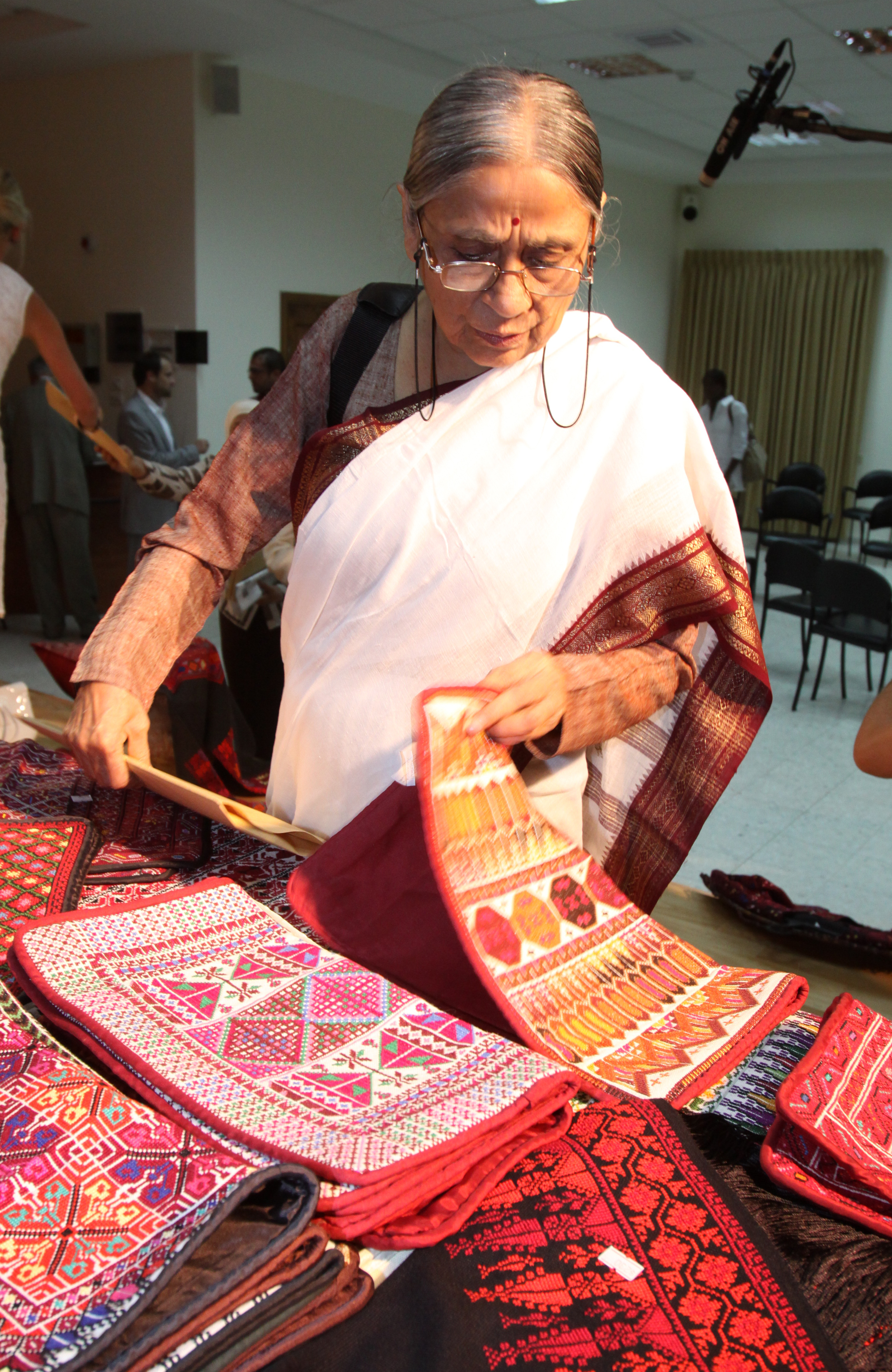
Ela Bhatt, founder and past president of SEWA, appreciating the fabrics at Qalandia Women's Cooperative

Self Employed Women's Association (SEWA), meaning "service" in several Indian languages, is a trade union based in Ahmedabad, India, that promotes the rights of low-income, independently employed female workers. Nearly 2 million workers are members of SEWA across eight states in India. Self-employed women are defined as those who do not have a fixed employer–employee relationship and do not receive a fixed salary and social protection like that of formally-employed workers and therefore have a more precarious income and life. SEWA organises around the goal of full employment in which a woman secures work, income, food, and social security like health care, child care, insurance, pension and shelter. The principles behind accomplishing these goals are struggle and development, meaning negotiating with stakeholders and providing services, respectively.

SEWA was founded in 1972 by labor lawyer and organiser Ela Bhatt. It emerged from the Women's Wing of the Textile Labour Association (TLA), a labour union founded by Gandhi in 1918. The organisation grew very quickly, with 30,000 members in 1996, to 318,527 in 2000, to 1,919,676 in 2013, and nearly 2 million in 2023. Even before the 2008 financial crisis, over 90% of India's working population was in the informal sector (Shakuntala 2015), and 94% of working women in 2009 worked in the informal sector (Bhatt 2009). India's history and patriarchal systems also contributes to this disparity because traditional gender roles exclude women from regular, secure forms of labour.

== History ==
=== TLA and Gandhian roots ===
SEWA originated in 1972 as the Association's Women's Wing of Textile Labour Association (TLA), which was established by Gandhi in 1918. SEWA is located in Ahmedabad, India, the city where Gandhi's ashram still exists and once served to facilitate much of the Mahatma's work. Gandhi's ethos of collective mobilization led to the founding of TLA, which is a labour union generally concerned with textile labourers in the formal sector. Around the era of SEWA's establishment, Ahmedabad youths were enthusiastic to interact with the poor because of Gandhi's legacy in the city. While not explicitly stated, low-income labourers in the formal sector are more likely to be men because of cultural practice putting men in positions of security and higher status. There were no unions protecting individuals who worked outside the formal sector, which tended to be women. As a young lawyer for TLA in the 1970s, Bhatt saw these women outside textile factories and created a department within the Women's Wing of TLA specifically devoted to women in the informal economy.

Gender discrimination was apparent in TLA, whose leading figures were all male during the time of SEWA's involvement in the organization.

Despite the rift between TLA and SEWA, there are clear influences of the Mahatma in SEWA's principles of truth, non-violence, and integration of all people that shape the organization to be so successful. Driving SEWA's every decision are satya (truth), ahimsa (non-violence), sarvadharma (integrating all faiths, all people) and khadi (propagation of local employment and self reliance), which all helped Gandhi organize poor people in the Indian independence movement.

=== Ela Bhatt ===
In 1972, SEWA materialized first as a collective of women that worked outside the textile mills and other formalized sources of income—individuals not targeted by TLA. An early survey of SEWA members found that 97% lived in slums, 93% were illiterate, the average member had four children, and one in three were the primary bread-winner. Its first large project was the SEWA Cooperative Bank, established in 1974 to provide loans to low-income members.

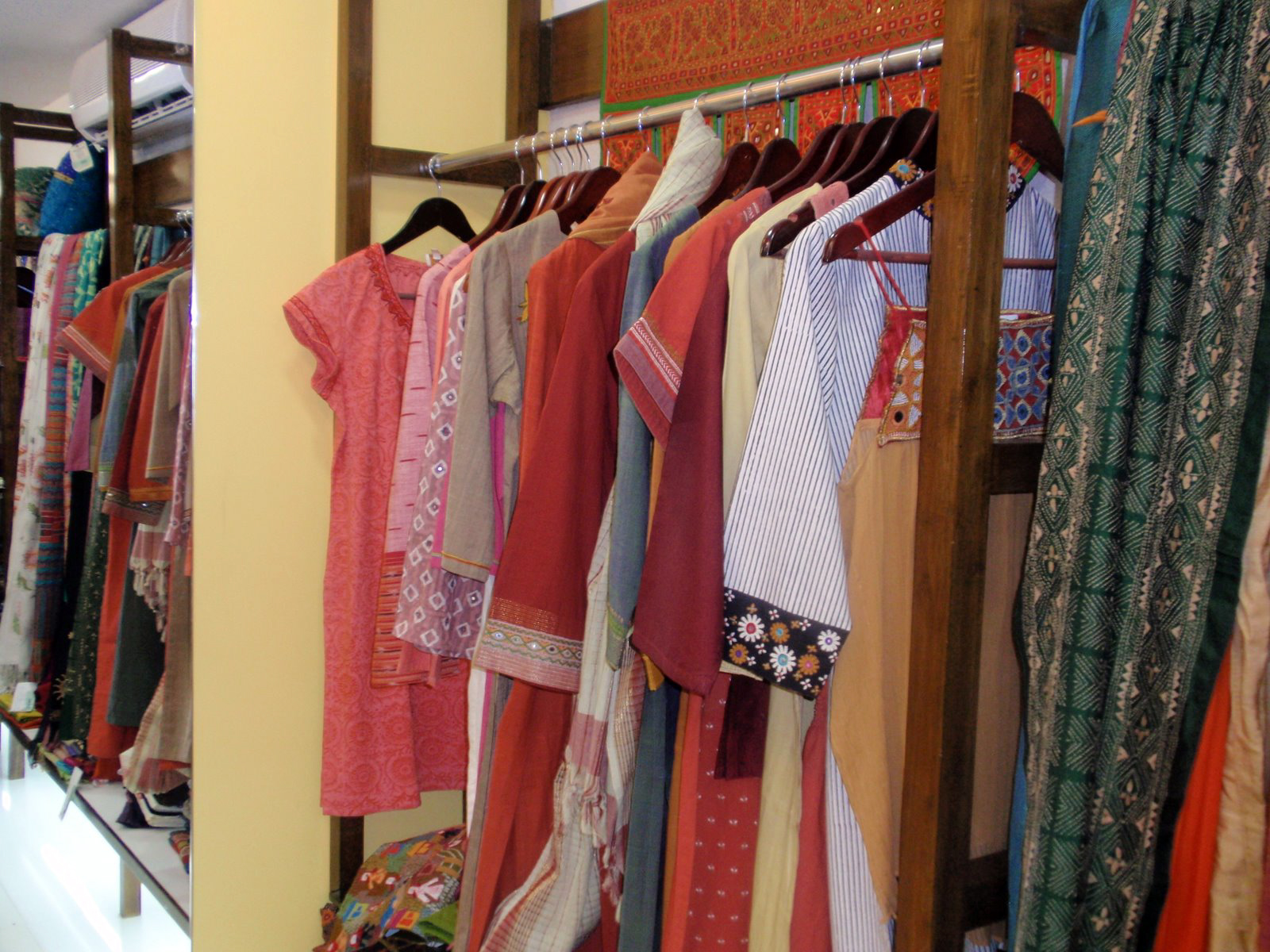
Products at the SEWA Hansiba Store in Mumbai

Behind all these accomplishments was SEWA's founder Ela Bhatt. Bhatt was born in Ahmedabad on 7 September 1933 to a Brahman caste family of lawyers and was, herself, a lawyer for TLA beginning in the early 1950s. Bhatt found that poor women in Ahmedabad were not just domestic workers, but conducted a variety of businesses at home—as hawkers, street vendors, construction labourers—and were not being represented in India's economy. Incredibly enough, 94% of Indian working women were self-employed in 2009, yet it took until 1972 for any sort of informal labour union to form. The former US Secretary of State Hillary Clinton saw Elaben Bhatt as one of her role models. Hillary visited SEWA first in 1995. In one of her speeches, she described Elaben as soft-spoken and a visionary leader.

== Recent history ==
In June 2024 a one-of-its-kind insurance policy has started making payouts to tens of thousands of women across India to help them cope with the impact of extreme heat. This policy covers 50,000 women in 22 districts across the states of Rajasthan, Maharashtra, and Gujarat.

== Tools for struggle and development ==
=== Organizing model ===
SEWA goes beyond being a labour union and additionally acts as a meeting point for poor, Indian women who are regularly marginalized across rural landscapes and isolated to urban slums. The model has spread from Ahmedabad to other parts of Gujarat as well as to other Indian states as part of the larger federation SEWA Bharat. SEWA's organizing model brings together women across castes and class who share experiences of labour exploitation. A survey of SEWA members show that its women achieve the goals of full employment and self-reliance through interpersonal recognition that also has been shown to increase productivity within the organization. SEWA also connects workers in the same business within over 50 cooperatives. SEWA serves as a model for successful bottom-up democratic organizations by emphasizing an organizational model.

Steps to organizing such a large union are outlined as follows:

1. Recruit members and assess needs of this unique cohort
2. Group members by trade, cooperative, region, etc.
3. Foster leadership within groups
4. Train leaders to promote SEWA programs either locally or within their profession
5. Elect members to positions of SEWA leadership councils

=== Economic tools ===
SEWA established its own bank in 1974 called the Shri Mahila Sewa Sahakari Bank, or SEWA Cooperative Bank, as a way to circumvent corrupt banks, moneylenders, and other middlemen. Everything about the bank is determined by SEWA members—the bankers and board members are organization members, the loan rates are set by members, the funds are entirely from members. SEWA Bank's philosophy is centered around saving and entrepreneurship, especially considering SEWA members have stock in the bank. SEWA gives microcredit, or microfinance, to members through its bank, which is considered by many to increase micro and macro productivity by lending to individuals to pursue a business, finance a home, and various other ways to establish one's self. Women have become a central demographic within microfinance because they are understood to be the most socially vulnerable population within poverty-stricken communities and also tend to generate wealth for the whole family rather than as an individual.

A large body of literature exists that critiques the merits of microcredit. Many (Keating, Rasmussen, Rishi 2015) argue that microcredits are indeed effective in bringing women into a liberated economy; however, the capitalist system women are introduced to is deeply violent and institutionally sexist. Mahajan (2005) argues that microcredit does nothing to promote economic growth for a nation as a whole for reasons that Surowiecki (2008) such as microloans stifling innovation and prohibiting job production—in other words stagnating business growth at "micro" level instead of "small" business level. Often, microloans simply have a crippling effect on the individual. A study by Jahiruddin (2011) of Bangladeshi microloan benefactors found that the poorest entrepreneurs (i.e. women) tend to be the most susceptible to business failure and increased debt because they have fewer resources as a safety net. The same study also found that entrepreneurs who reported worsening poverty also are the most dependent on microloans.

Research specific to SEWA Bank complicates the above narrative. A 1999 study by Chen and Snodgrass found that SEWA members using the microloan program experienced an increase in income and could more easily find gainful employment. Another study by Bhatt and Bhatt (2016) found that women in the program also find more self-esteem and confidence to conduct business. One reason for these differing experiences could be that SEWA provides both monetary support and financial guidance that other microloan programs do not. These individual experiences, however, do not speak to the deleterious macroeconomic implications of microloans.

Other economic tools used by SEWA include guidance in savings, insurance, housing, social security, pensions, fundamentals of personal finance, and counseling.

=== Governmental tools ===
As one of the largest organizations in India, SEWA uses its huge political influence in lobbying for various causes. They fight to incorporate the informal sector into national economic statistics and economic policies, as well as the provision of social securities, because their members do not have employers to provide insurance, healthcare, childcare, etc. In fact, women who work in the informal economy are often subject to police harassment because street vending is illegal, which provokes unnecessary force from law enforcement. SEWA educates street vendors on how to apply for permits and work within the justice system. In addition to protecting the rights of its members, SEWA is a loud voice in human rights for India in general. During the peak of Muslim–Hindu tension in the early 21st century, SEWA acted as a peacekeeper because of its nature as a bridge between the two religions, between castes, and between classes.

=== Action oriented research ===
SEWA Academy is a branch that conducts credible research on a range of subjects from childcare, to health reform, to professional experiences, and many other issues of importance to the organization. The method of research is variegated, too, from self-evaluation to surveys. In doing so, SEWA can assess its programming efficacy and determine what issues are most pressing for members. As a grassroots organization, SEWA researchers are members that undergo research training that thus provides another skill and connects women to education. Women in Informal Employment: Globalizing and Organizing (WIEGO), a sister group co-founded by Elaban Bhatt, produces extensive research on self-employed women at the global scale. WIEGO is within the Hauser Center for Non-Profit Organizations, a department of Harvard University's John F. Kennedy School of Government. Several studies are co-authored by SEWA and WIEGO.

=== Social platform ===
To counter the perception that Indian women are most useful in the household, SEWA makes visible the crafts, skills, and value of female labour to the Indian economy. More than the Indian economy, self-employed women have a role in social hemispheres with few outlets to participate—SEWA works to bridge that gap by acting as a platform for civic engagement in local communities.

== Goals ==
SEWA's main goals are to organize women workers for full employment and self-reliance. SEWA aims to mainstream marginalized, poor women in the informal sector and lift them out of their poverty. Their members have the possibility to take care of their children and their elderly while they can generate earnings for the family unit. Also, they produce low cost goods for the domestic and global markets. So, they allow low-income people to have the chance to purchase low cost goods and services.

SEWA has interacted and has been advised by many law firms like HSA.

=== Employment ===
SEWA Mahila Housing Trust, founded by Renana Jhabvala among others, created the Karmika School for Construction Workers in 2003 to help train women in the construction trades. Women made up 51 percent of employees in construction trades in India in 2003, but most women in the construction industry had been unskilled labourers. After training at Karmika, according to a 2007 survey of graduates, 40 percent reported working 21–30 days per month as opposed to 26 percent who reported similar work days before training. 30 percent became helpers to masons, and 20 percent became masons themselves. These increases come mostly from small private construction projects, such as housing, but there was very little success placing women in the more profitable public sector infrastructure projects. SEWA's childcare cooperatives in Sangini and Shaishav, have helped more than 400 women get regular work as providers of childcare.

=== Income ===
In 1994, members' earnings were Rs 39 million for 32,794 women (about Rs 1200 average). By 1998, members' average earnings had risen to Rs 304.5 million for 49,398 women (about Rs 6164 average). This is from aggregate numbers including urban and rural workers. Most of this increase occurred in urban areas. SEWA has had more difficulty pushing for higher wages in rural areas, due to the excess supply of labour in those regions, which weakens the bargaining position of women. In the construction trades, skilled women workers earn comparable salaries to their male counterparts. Mahila Housing SEWA Trust's Karmika School helps women in the construction trades in India to gain those skills. Providing childcare has led to income increases of 50% in Kheda and Surendranagar.

=== Food and nutrition ===
SEWA's push for food security brought about programs to deliver food grain in Gujarat. The child care centers established by SEWA have acted during natural disasters such as floods and droughts to provide necessary food as well as other emergency supplies and assistance. The two districts of Surendranagar and Patan in particular have 25 childcare centers in their communities, which were able to respond to droughts, epidemics, cyclones, floods and the earthquake in 2001 not only with childcare but also food, water, and shelter.

=== Health ===
In 1984, SEWA began offering health insurance, which cost their member Rs 85 annually. Health care has become one of their largest projects. Since 1992, Vimo SEWA has provided life and hospitalization insurance for its members and their families for as little as Rs 100 per person. Enrollment topped 130,000 people in 2005.

SEWA found that the very poor used this access to health care less than those slightly less poor. Some of the factors include distance to care providers and facilities and the "ex-post reimbursement" nature of health insurance, in which patients must pay upfront and then claim reimbursement. They continue studying the issue of how to bring access to all.

SEWA also has programs to improve water quality by training some of their members to repair pumps for wells and campaigning for underground water tanks for drought-prone areas.

=== Childcare ===
In studies in the Kheda and Surendranagar districts before 2006, poor women with access to child care earned 50 percent more. Childcare also encourages going to school for the entire community by improving the view of the value of education, as well as freeing older siblings from childcare responsibility, allowing them to continue their education. It removes social barriers by helping to alleviate the caste distinctions as children of all castes learn and play together. It aids poverty alleviation by allowing mothers to work and earn more. SEWA has childcare cooperatives in Sangini and Shaishav.

=== Housing ===
As of 1989, SEWA bank had 11,000 members. Nearly 40 percent of their loans were for purchasing or improving housing. One requirement of the borrower was purchasing shares in the bank worth 5 percent of the loan. However, most low-income households do not qualify for loans from the bank and still must seek other options. Also, SEWA has pushed for women to put their names on titles for property, in order to improve women's property rights.

=== Assets ===
The Shri Mahila Sewa Sahakari Bank, or SEWA bank, was created to help self-employed women gain access to financial resources. It began with 4000 women each contributing Rs 10. The bank encourages saving and has adapted the traditional banking approach to assist the mostly illiterate members, such as issuing ID cards with pictures and fingerprints, since many women cannot sign their name, as well as institute "mobile banks" that visit the rural areas and slums in order to provide banking services, since it is difficult for the women to come to the bank. The bank grew from 6,631 members in 1975 to 20,657 in 1997 and from 1,660,431 working capital to 167,331,000. SEWA Bank formed savings and credit groups in the 1990s. They began lending to rural women and encouraged these women to have their names included on title deeds to the lands purchased.

=== Workers' organizational strength ===
The Surendranagar child care cooperative, which is run locally, inspired the creation of the "Women and Children's Development Mandal". It consists of over 20,000 women and provides services such as finance, employment support, housing services, as well as childcare. SEWA's membership in Ahmedabad had grown to 55,000 workers in 1995, far outpacing the membership of the Textile Labour Association, SEWA's original parent organization, in that city. By organizing and collective action, the women of SEWA were able to achieve a voice in the government that did not listen to them individually. They were able to pool small amounts of money to form the SEWA Bank. They were able to draw attention to the unorganized sector of the economy, those who were self-employed or temporary workers without an explicit employer.

=== Workers' leadership ===
In a 2007 survey of Karmika School graduates, 68 percent report more confidence in their work and higher status within the family. SEWA's organization and leaders have directly created or indirectly iwomen'sed other organizations within India, in other countries and worldwide, including WIEGO Women in Informal Employment: Globalizing and Organizing and SEWU Self-Employed Women's Union, Participation in SEWA's programs and their models has increased women's participation in community affairs, reduced domestic violence, and raised their feeling of empowerment overall. SEWA was recognized as a Central trade union in 2009. SEWA assisted in passing India's Act on the Unorganized Sector, which establishes some welfare and social security for non-traditional employees. They continue to work for a better share of social security and the rights of labour standards enjoyed by traditional employees.

=== Self-reliance ===
According to personal interviews in July 1998, women who have worked with SEWA in their communities feel more confident and gain more respect from the men. They have managed co-operative businesses, in one case in the village of Baldana, better than the men who had managed that same business. The cooperative had been operating at a loss. SEWA helped convert it to women management. The men of the village "forcibly ousted women on renewed profitability. Soon, corruption led to huge losses again and women's and SEWA's intervention."

=== Literacy ===
Many of SEWA's members are illiterate, leading to problems in understanding laws, conducting business and daily life (for example, according to a SEWA member, "We cannot read the bus numbers, often we miss our bus". In 1992, SEWA began offering literacy classes in May 1992 for Rs 5 per month).
