= Ela Bhatt =

Indian cooperative organiser (1933–2022)

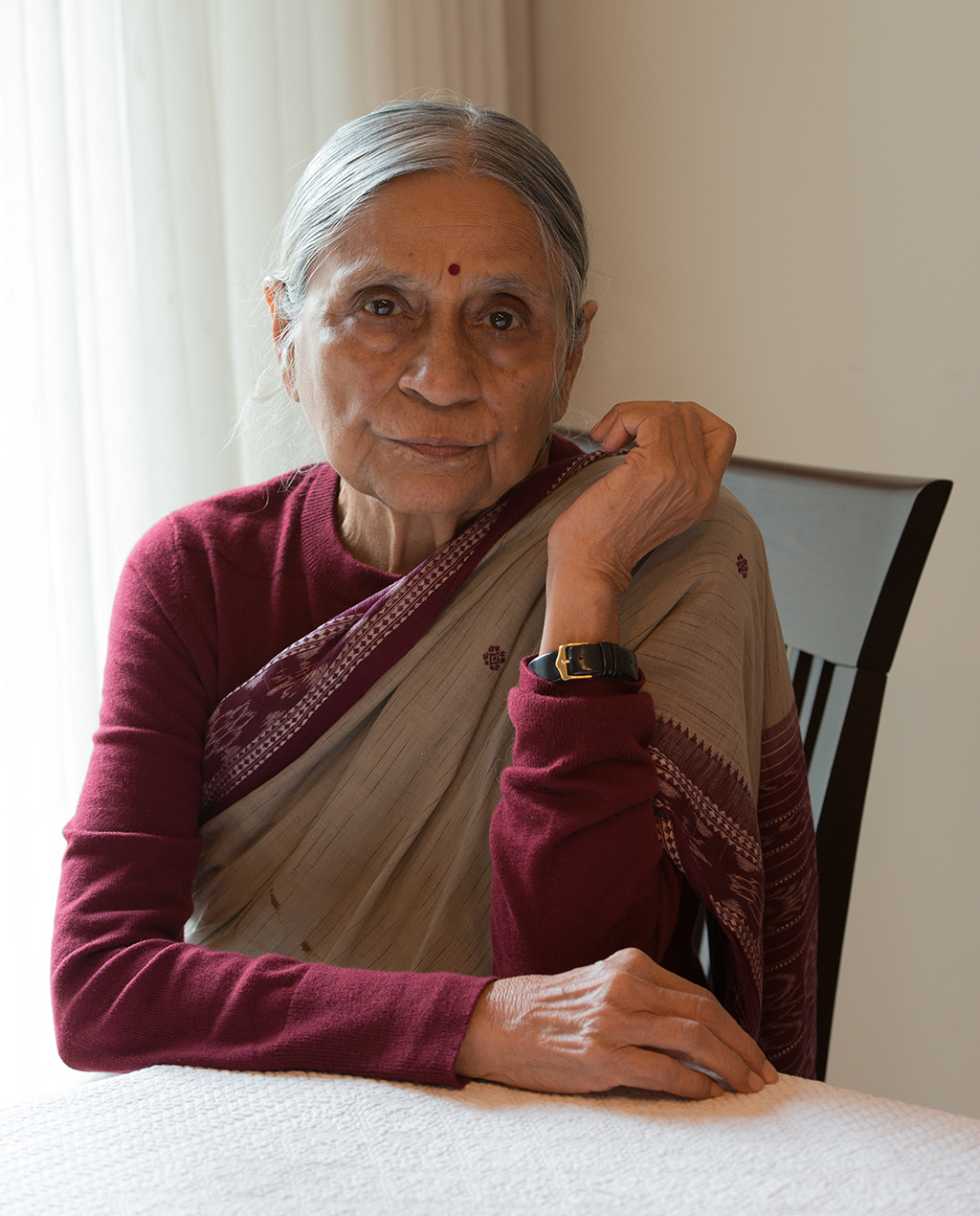
- Bhatt in 2013
- Born: 7 September 1933; Ahmedabad, Bombay Presidency, British India
- Died: 2 November 2022 (aged 89); Ahmedabad, Gujarat, India
- Education: Sarvajanik Girls High School, Surat; M.T.B. College, Surat; Afro-Asian Institute of Labor and Cooperatives, Tel Aviv
- Occupations: Lawyer, philanthropist
- Organization(s): SEWA, The Elders
- Known for: Founded SEWA
- Spouse: Ramesh Bhatt
- Awards: Padma Shri, Padma Bhushan, Ramon Magsaysay Award, Right Livelihood Award, Niwano Peace Prize, Indira Gandhi Prize for Peace, Disarmament and Development

Member of Parliament, Rajya Sabha
- In office 12 May 1986 – 26 September 1988
- Constituency: Nominated
- Website: sewa.org

Ela Ramesh Bhatt (7 September 1933 – 2 November 2022) was an Indian cooperative organiser, activist and Gandhian, who founded the Self-Employed Women's Association of India (SEWA) in 1972, and served as its general secretary from 1972 to 1996. She was the chancellor of the Gujarat Vidyapith from 7 March 2015 to 19 October 2022. A lawyer by training, Bhatt was a part of the international labour, cooperative, women, and micro-finance movements and won several national and international awards, including the Ramon Magsaysay Award (1977), Right Livelihood Award (1984) for "helping home-based producers to organise for their welfare and self-respect" and the Padma Bhushan (1986).

== Early life and background ==
Bhatt was born at Ahmedabad in India. Her father, Sumantrai Bhatt, was a successful lawyer, while her mother, Vanalila Vyas, was active in the women's movement and also remained secretary of All India Women's Conference, which in turn was founded by Kamaladevi Chattopadhyay.

The middle child of three sisters, her childhood was spent in Surat, where she attended the Sarvajanik Girls High School from 1940 to 1948. She received her Bachelor of Arts degree in English from the M.T.B. College (South Gujarat University) in Surat in 1952. Following graduation, she entered L.A. Shah Law College in Ahmedabad. In 1954, she received her degree in law and a gold medal for her work on Hindu law.

== Career ==
Bhatt started her career teaching English for a short time at SNDT Women's University, better known as SNDT, in Mumbai. In 1955 she joined the legal department of the Textile Labour Association (TLA), India's oldest unions for textile workers, in Ahmedabad.

=== TLA and SEWA ===
In 1956, Ela Bhatt married Ramesh Bhatt (now deceased). After working for sometime with the Gujarat government, Ela was asked by the TLA to head its women's wing in 1968. She went to Israel where she studied at the Afro-Asian Institute of Labour and Cooperatives in Tel Aviv for three months, receiving the International Diploma of Labor and Cooperatives in 1971. She was very much aware that thousands of female textile workers worked elsewhere to supplement the family income, but state laws protected only industrial workers and not these self-employed women.

With the co-operation of Arvind Buch, then-president of the TLA, she undertook to organise these self-employed women into a union under the auspices of the Women's Wing of the TLA. Then in 1972 the Self-Employed Women's Association (SEWA) was established with Bhatt as president and she served as its general-secretary from 1972 to 1996.

=== The Elders: 2007–2022 ===
On 18 July 2007 in Johannesburg, South Africa, Nelson Mandela, Graça Machel, and Desmond Tutu convened a group of world leaders to contribute their wisdom, independent leadership and integrity to tackle some of the world's toughest problems. Mandela announced the formation of this new group, The Elders, in a speech he delivered on the occasion of his 89th birthday.

Kofi Annan served as Chair of The Elders and Gro Harlem Brundtland as deputy chair. The Elders work globally, on thematic as well as geographically specific subjects. The Elders' priority issue areas include the Israeli–Palestinian conflict, the Korean Peninsula, Sudan and South Sudan, sustainable development, and equality for girls and women.

Bhatt was particularly involved in The Elders' initiative on equality for women and girls, including on the issue of child marriage. In February 2012, Bhatt travelled to Bihar, India with fellow Elders Desmond Tutu, Gro Harlem Brundtland and Mary Robinson. Together, the Elders visited Jagriti, a youth-led project aimed at preventing child marriage, and encouraged the state government's efforts to tackle the issue.

A Gandhian practitioner of non-violence, Bhatt also travelled to the Middle East with Elders delegations in August 2009 and October 2010.

In a blog post written for The Elders' website following the group's visit to Gaza in October 2010, Bhatt stated that non-violent struggle against injustice requires "more hard work than fighting" and that "it is the coward who uses weapons."

The Elders are independently funded by such donors as Sir Richard Branson and Jean Oelwang (Virgin Unite), Peter Gabriel (The Peter Gabriel Foundation), Kathy Bushkin Calvin (United Nations Foundation), Jeremy Coller and Lulit Solomon (J. Coller Foundation), Niclas Kjellström-Matseke (Swedish Postcode Lottery), Jeff Skoll and Sally Osberg (Skoll Foundation), and Marieke van Schaik (Dutch Postcode Lottery), among others. Mabel van Oranje, former CEO of The Elders, sits on the Advisory Council in her capacity as Advisory Committee Chair of Girls Not Brides: The Global Partnership to End Child Marriage.

== Personal life ==
Ela Bhatt married Ramesh Bhatt in 1956, with whom she had two children, Amimayi (b. 1958) and Mihir (b. 1959). She lived in Ahmedabad, Gujarat with her family. She died on 2 November 2022, at the age of 89.

== Awards and recognition ==
Bhatt was one of the founders of Women's World Banking in 1979 with Esther Ocloo and Michaela Walsh, and served as its chair from 1980 to 1998. She has served as Chair of the SEWA Cooperative Bank, of HomeNet, of the International Alliance of Street Vendors, and was formerly on the board of directors of WIEGO. She was also a trustee of the Rockefeller Foundation.

Bhatt was granted an honorary Doctorate degree in Humane Letters by Harvard University in June 2001. In 2012, she received a Doctor of Humane Letters, honoris causa from Georgetown University and an honorary doctorate from Université libre de Bruxelles in Brussels, Belgium. She also held honorary doctorates from Yale and the University of Natal.

Ela Bhatt was also awarded the civilian honour of Padma Shri by the Government of India in 1985, and the Padma Bhushan in 1986. She was awarded the Ramon Magsaysay Award for Community Leadership in 1977 and the Right Livelihood Award in 1984.

Bhatt was chosen for the Niwano Peace Prize in 2010 for her work empowering poor women in India.

In November 2010, US Secretary of State Hillary Clinton honoured Bhatt with the Global Fairness Initiative Award for helping move more than a million poor women in India to a position of dignity and independence.

Ela Bhatt was honoured with the prestigious Radcliffe Medal on 27 May 2011 on Radcliffe Day for her efforts in helping uplift women, which has had a significant impact on society.

In November 2011, Ela Bhatt was selected for the Indira Gandhi Prize for Peace, Disarmament and Development 2011 for her lifetime achievements in empowering women through grassroots entrepreneurship.

In June 2012, US Secretary of State Hillary Clinton identified Ela Bhatt as one of her 'heroines'. She said, "I have a lot of heroes and heroines around the world and one of them is Ela Bhatt, who started an organisation called the Self-Employed Women's Association (SEWA) in India many years ago".

== Writings ==
Bhatt's book has been translated into Gujarati, Urdu, Hindi and is currently being translated into French and Tamil.

- Bhatt, E. R. (2006). We are poor but so many: the story of self-employed women in India. Oxford, Oxford University Press. ISBN 0-19-516984-0
- Bhatt, E.R. (2015). Anubandh : Building Hundred Mile Communities. Ahmedabad, Navjeevan Publishing House. ISBN 9788172296759
