= Giovanni Andrea Cornia =

Italian economist (1947–2024)

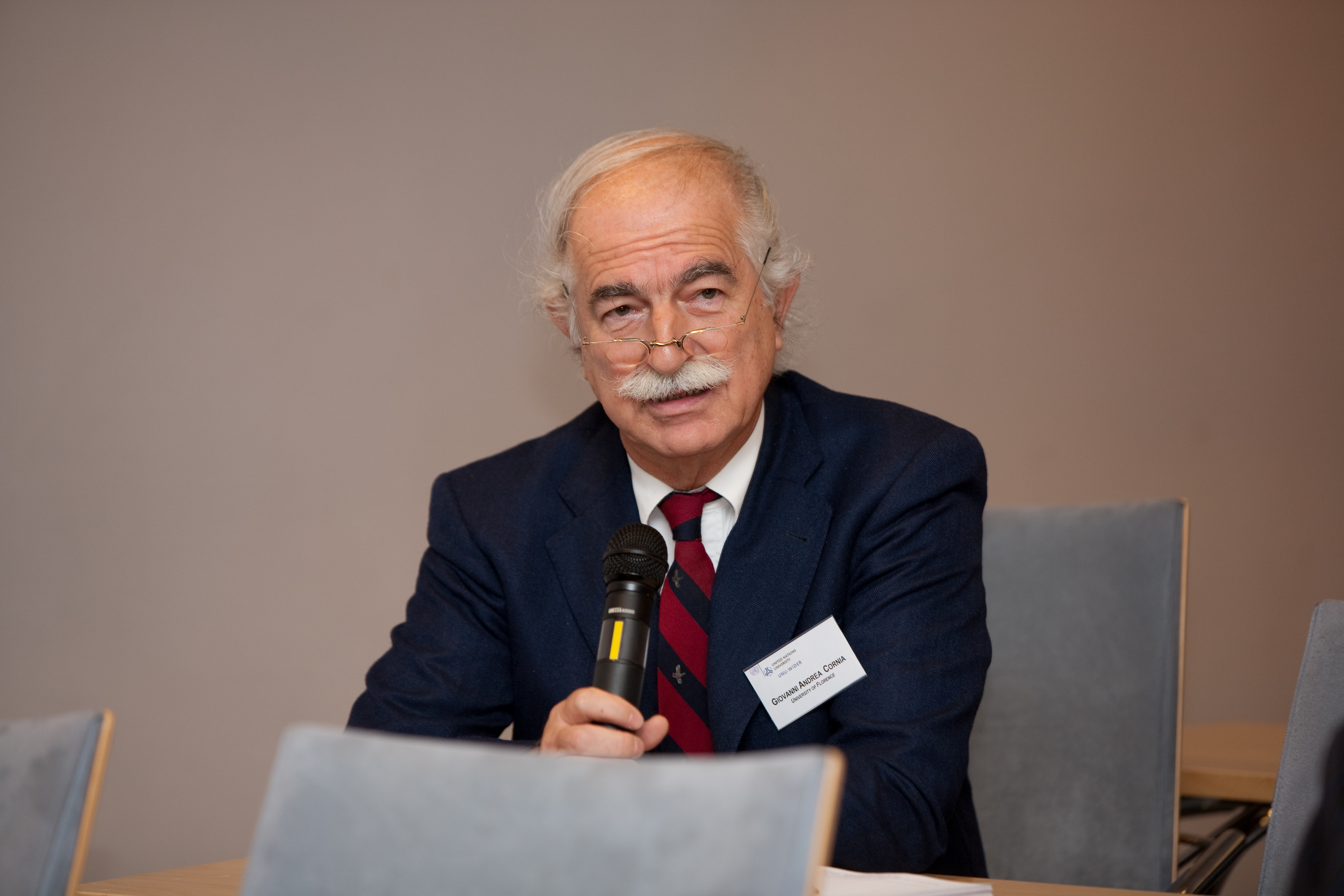
- Born: 9 April 1947
- Died: July 2024 (aged 77)

Academic work
- Discipline: Development economics
- Institutions: Department of Economics and Management, University of Florence
- Website: Information at IDEAS / RePEc

Giovanni Andrea Cornia (9 April 1947 – July 2024) was an Italian development economist. He was professor of economics, department of economics and management (formerly faculty of economics), at the University of Florence. He had previously been the director of the Regional Institute of Economic Planning of Tuscany (Istituto Regionale Programmazione Economica della Toscana, IRPET), the United Nations University World Institute for Development Economics Research (UNU-WIDER), in Helsinki, and the Economic and Policy Research Program, UNICEF Office of Research-Innocenti, in Florence. He was formerly also chief economist, UNICEF, New York. His main areas of professional interest were income and asset inequality, poverty, growth, child well-being, human development and mortality crises, transition economics, and institutional economics. He was author of over a dozen books and dozens of articles, reports and working papers on practical development economics issues in individual countries, regions and globally. Born on 9 April 1947, he died in July 2024, at the age of 77.

== Selected bibliography ==
=== Books ===
- Cornia, Giovanni A.; Jolly, Richard (1984). The impact of world recession on children. Oxford Oxfordshire New York: Pergamon Press. ISBN 978-0-08-031329-0.
- Cornia, Giovanni A.; Stewart, Frances; Jolly, Richard (1987). Adjustment with a human face: protecting the vulnerable and promoting growth (a study by UNICEF). Vol. 1. Oxford Oxfordshire Oxford Oxfordshire New York: Clarendon Press Oxford University Press. ISBN 978-0-19-828610-3.
- Cornia, Giovanni A.; Stewart, Frances; Jolly, Richard (1987). Adjustment with a human face: ten country case studies (a study by UNICEF). Vol. 2. Oxford Oxfordshire Oxford Oxfordshire New York: Clarendon Press Oxford University Press. ISBN 978-0-19-828611-0.
- Cornia, Giovanni A.; van der Hoeven, Rolph; Mkandawire, Thandika (1992). Africa's Recovery in the 1990s: From Stagnation and Adjustment to Human Development. London New York: Macmillan.
- Cornia, Giovanni A.; Helleiner, Gerald K. (1994). From adjustment to development in Africa: conflict, controversy, convergence, consensus. New York, New York: St. Martin's Press. ISBN 978-0-333-61362-7.
- Cornia, Giovanni A.; Paniccià, Renato (2000). The mortality crisis in transitional economies. Oxford New York: Oxford University Press United Nations University. ISBN 978-0-19-829741-3.
- Cornia, Giovanni A.; Popov, Vladimir L. (2001). Transition and institutions: the experience of gradual and late reformers. Oxford New York: Oxford University Press. ISBN 978-0-19-924218-4.
- Cornia, Giovanni A. (2004). Inequality, growth, and poverty in an era of liberalization and globalization. Oxford New York: Oxford University Press. ISBN 978-0-19-927141-2.
- Cornia, Giovanni A. (2006). Pro-Poor Macroeconomics: Potential and Limitations. London New York: Palgrave.
- Cornia, Giovanni A. (2007). AIDS, child well-being and public policy. Florence: UNICEF-IRC.
- Cornia, Giovanni A. (2014). Falling Inequality in Latin America: Policy Changes and Lessons. Oxford New York: Oxford University Press.
- Cornia, Giovanni A.; Stewart, Frances (2014). Towards human development: new approaches to macroeconomics and inequality. Oxford, Oxfordshire: Oxford University Press. ISBN 978-0-19-870608-3.
