= Anthony Shorrocks =

British development economist

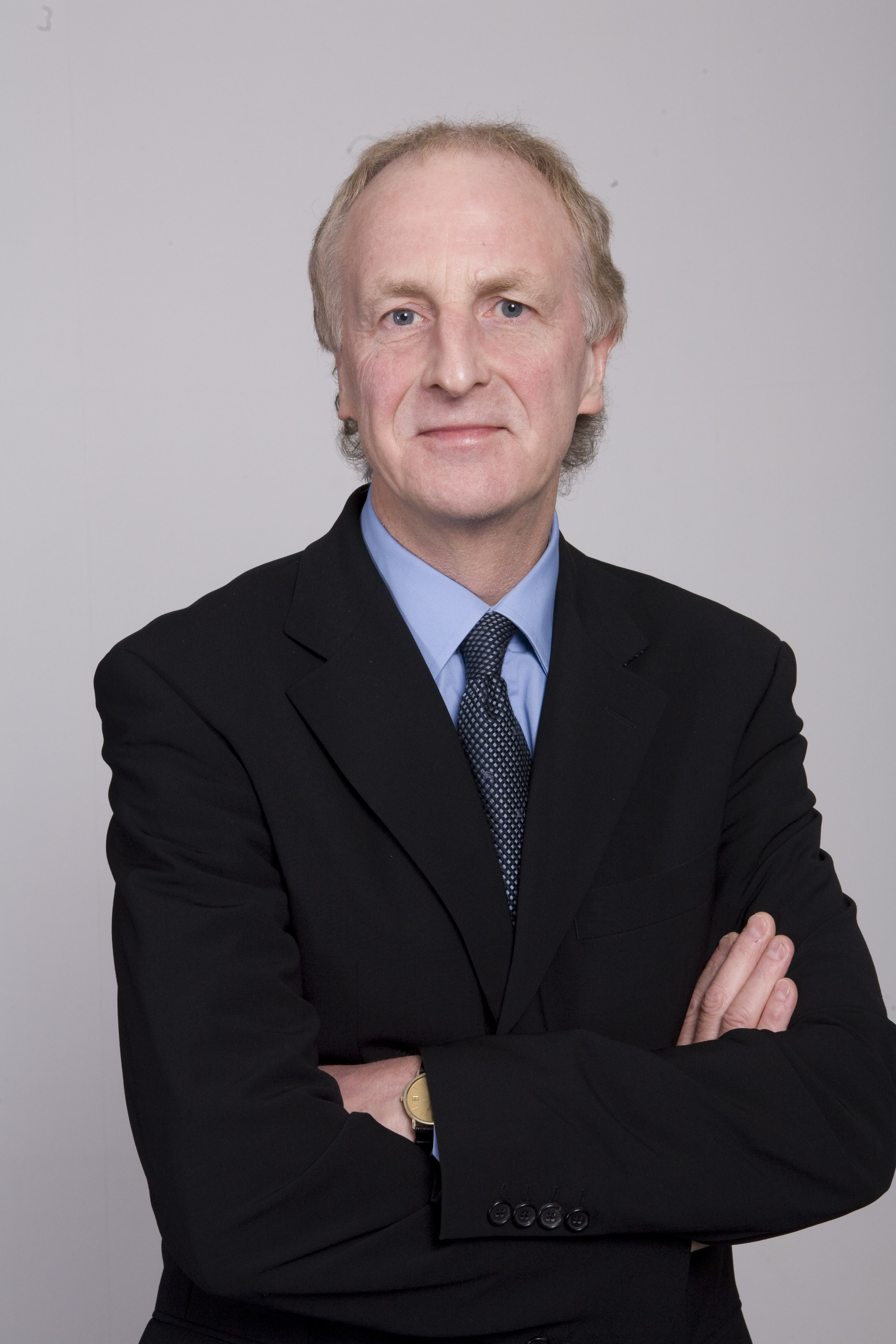
- Born: 30 October 1946 (age 79); London, England

Academic background
- Education: University of Sussex (BSc); Brown University (MA); London School of Economics (PhD)
- Doctoral advisor: Frank Hahn; Terence Gorman

Academic work
- Discipline: Development economics

Anthony F. Shorrocks is a British development economist.

== Academic career ==
Between January 2001 and April 2009 he was Director of UNU-WIDER. Prior to that he was Professor at the London School of Economics and before that he worked at the University of Essex. He has also had several visiting appointments in the US, Canada, Italy, and Russia.

He has many publications in leading economic journals on income and wealth distribution, inequality, poverty, and mobility.

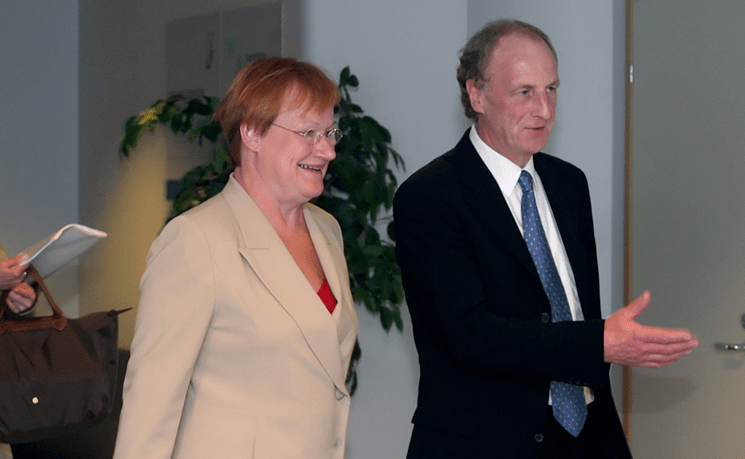
Shorrocks together with Tarja Halonen, then President of Finland

== Education ==
His first degree was a B.Sc. in Mathematics from the University of Sussex. This was followed by a Masters in Economics from Brown University. He took his Ph.D. in Economics at the London School of Economics in 1973 (being awarded the Bowley Prize in 1975).

== Shorrocks index ==
In 1978, he introduced a measure based on income Gini coefficients to estimate income mobility. This measure, generalized by Maasoumi and Zandvakili, is now generally referred to as Shorrocks index, sometimes as Shorrocks mobility index or Shorrocks rigidity index. It attempts to estimate whether the income inequality Gini coefficient is permanent or temporary, and to what extent a country or region enables economic mobility to its people so that they can move from one (e.g. bottom 20%) income quantile to another (e.g. middle 20%) over time. In other words, Shorrocks index compares inequality of short-term earnings such as annual income of households, to inequality of long-term earnings such as 5-year or 10-year total income for same households.

== Professional recognition ==
He was elected a Fellow of the Econometric Society in 1996.

== Noted works ==
=== Books ===
- Shorrocks, A.F.; Blackorby, C. (1995). Collected works of W.M. Gorman. Oxford New York: Clarendon Press Oxford University Press. ISBN 9780198285212.
- Shorrocks, A.F.; van der Hoeven, Rolph (2003). Perspectives on growth and poverty. Tokyo New York: United Nations University Press. ISBN 9789280810912.
- Shorrocks, A.F.; van der Hoeven, Rolph (2004). Growth, inequality, and poverty: prospects for pro-poor economic development. Oxford New York: Oxford University Press. ISBN 9780199268658.
- Shorrocks, Anthony; Mavrotas, George (2007). Advancing development: core themes in global economics. Houndmills, Basingstoke Hampshire New York: Palgrave Macmillan in association with the United Nations University World Institute for Development Economics Research. ISBN 9780230019027.

=== Chapters in books ===
- Shorrocks, Anthony; Wan, Guanghua (2009), "Ungrouping income distributions: synthesizing samples for inequality and poverty analysis", in Kanbur, Ravi; Basu, Kaushik (eds.), Arguments for a better world: essays in honor of Amartya Sen | Volume I: Ethics, welfare, and measurement, Oxford New York: Oxford University Press, pp. 414–434, ISBN 9780199239115

=== Journal articles ===
- Shorrocks, Anthony (December 1978). "Income inequality and income mobility". Journal of Economic Theory. 19 (2): 376–393. doi:10.1016/0022-0531(78)90101-1.
- Shorrocks, Anthony; Wan, Guanghua (January 2005). "Spatial decomposition of inequality". Journal of Economic Geography. 5 (1): 59–81. doi:10.1093/jnlecg/lbh054. hdl:10419/52738.
