= Wan Guanghua =

Wan Guanghua (Chinese: 万广华; born 1961 in Jiangdu, Jiangsu) is a Chinese economist. He is Principal Economist at the Asian Development Bank. Formerly Project Director at UNU-WIDER, he has taught and researched in development economics an applied econometrics at a range of universities including the University of New England and the University of Sydney and he is an honorary professor at several leading universities in China. He is particularly noted for pioneering work in the development of regression-based decomposition techniques for inequality and poverty accounting. He has many academic papers published in peer reviewed journals.

== Key works ==
=== Books ===
- Wan, Guanghua (2008). Understanding inequality and poverty in China: methods and applications. Houndmills, Basingstoke, Hampshire New York: Palgrave Macmillan. ISBN 9780230538047.
- Wan, Guanghua (2008). Inequality and growth in modern China. Oxford New York: Oxford University Press. ISBN 9780199535194.

=== Chapters in books ===
- Wan, Guanghua; Shorrocks, Anthony (2009), "Ungrouping income distributions: synthesizing samples for inequality and poverty analysis", in Kanbur, Ravi; Basu, Kaushik (eds.), Arguments for a better world: essays in honor of Amartya Sen | Volume I: Ethics, welfare, and measurement, Oxford New York: Oxford University Press, pp. 414–434, ISBN 9780199239115
