= Thatcherism =

British conservative ideology from the 1980s onward

Thatcherism is a form of British conservative ideology named after Conservative Party leader Margaret Thatcher that relates to not just her political platform and particular policies, but also her personal character and style of management while in office. Proponents of Thatcherism are referred to as Thatcherites. The term has been used to describe the principles of the British government under Thatcher from the 1979 general election to her resignation in 1990. In international terms, Thatcherites have been described as a part of the general socio-economic movement known as neoliberalism, with different countries besides the United Kingdom (such as the United States) sharing similar policies around expansionary capitalism.

Thatcherism represents a systematic, decisive rejection and reversal of the post-war consensus inside Great Britain in terms of governance, whereby the major political parties largely agreed on the central themes of Keynesianism, the welfare state, nationalised industry, and close regulation of the British economy before Thatcher's rise to prominence. Under her administration, there was one major exception to Thatcherite changes: the National Health Service (NHS), which was widely popular with the British public. In 1982, Thatcher promised that the NHS was "safe in our hands".

The exact terms of what makes up Thatcherism and its specific legacy in British history over the past decades are controversial. Ideologically, Thatcherism has been described by Nigel Lawson, Thatcher's Chancellor of the Exchequer from 1983 to 1989, as a political platform emphasising free markets with restrained government spending and tax cuts that gets coupled with British nationalism both at home and abroad. Thatcher herself rarely used the word "Thatcherism". However, she gave a speech in Solihull during her campaign for the 1987 general election and included in a discussion of the economic successes the remark: "that's what I call Thatcherism".

The Daily Telegraph stated in April 2008 that the programme of the next non-Conservative government, with Tony Blair's "New Labour" organisation governing the nation throughout the 1990s and 2000s, basically accepted the central reform measures of Thatcherism such as deregulation, privatisation of key national industries, maintaining a flexible labour market, marginalising the trade unions and centralising power from local authorities to central government. While Blair distanced himself from certain aspects of Thatcherism earlier in his career, in his 2010 autobiography A Journey, he argued both that "Britain needed the industrial and economic reforms of the Thatcher period" and as well that "much of what she wanted to do in the 1980s was inevitable, a consequence not of ideology but of social and economic change."

== Overview ==
[A] mixture of free markets, financial discipline, firm control over public expenditure, tax cuts, nationalism, "Victorian values" (of the Samuel Smiles self-help variety), privatisation and a dash of populism.

— Nigel Lawson's definition of Thatcherism

Thatcherism attempts to promote low inflation, the small state and free markets through tight control of the money supply, privatisation and constraints on the labour movement. It is often compared with Reaganomics in the United States, economic rationalism in Australia and Rogernomics in New Zealand and as a key part of the worldwide economic liberal movement.

Thatcherism is thus often compared to classical liberalism. Milton Friedman said that "Margaret Thatcher is not in terms of belief a Tory. She is a nineteenth-century Liberal". Thatcher herself stated during a speech in 1983: "I would not mind betting that if Mr Gladstone were alive today he would apply to join the Conservative Party". In the 1996 Keith Joseph memorial lecture, Thatcher argued: "The kind of Conservatism which he and I [...] favoured would be best described as 'liberal', in the old-fashioned sense. And I mean the liberalism of Mr Gladstone, not of the latter day collectivists". Thatcher once told Friedrich Hayek: "I know you want me to become a Whig; no, I am a Tory". Hayek believed "she has felt this very clearly". The relationship between Thatcherism and liberalism is complicated. Thatcher's former defence secretary John Nott claimed that "it is a complete misreading of her beliefs to depict her as a nineteenth-century Liberal".

As Ellen Meiksins Wood has argued, Thatcherite capitalism was compatible with traditional British political institutions. As prime minister, Thatcher did not challenge ancient institutions such as the monarchy or the House of Lords, but some of the most recent additions, such as the trade unions. Indeed, many leading Thatcherites, including Thatcher herself, went on to join the House of Lords, an honour which William Ewart Gladstone, for instance, had declined. Thinkers closely associated with Thatcherism include Keith Joseph, Enoch Powell, Friedrich Hayek and Milton Friedman. In an interview with Simon Heffer in 1996, Thatcher stated that the two greatest influences on her as Conservative leader had been Joseph and Powell, who were both "very great men".

Thatcher was a strong critic of communism, Marxism and socialism. Biographer John Campbell reports that in July 1978, when asked by a Labour MP in Commons what she meant by socialism, "she was at a loss to reply. What in fact she meant was Government support for inefficient industries, punitive taxation, regulation of the labour market, price controls – everything that interfered with the functioning of the free economy".

=== Thatcherism before Thatcher ===
Several commentators have traced the origins of Thatcherism in post-war British politics. The historian Ewen Green claimed there was resentment of the inflation, taxation and the constraints imposed by the labour movement, which was associated with the so-called Buttskellite consensus in the decades before Thatcher came to prominence. Although the Conservative leadership accommodated itself to the Clement Attlee government's post-war reforms, there was continuous opposition in the lower ranks of the party, pressure groups like the Middle Class Alliance and the People's League for the Defence of Freedom and later in think tanks like the Centre for Policy Studies. For example, in the 1945 general election, the Conservative Party chairman Ralph Assheton had wanted 12,000 abridged copies of The Road to Serfdom (a book by the economist Friedrich Hayek later closely associated with Thatcherism), taking up one-and-a-half tons of the party's paper ration, distributed as election propaganda.

The historian Christopher Cooper traced the formation of the monetarist economics at the heart of Thatcherism back to the resignation of the Conservative chancellor of the Exchequer, Peter Thorneycroft, in 1958.

As early as 1950, Thatcher accepted the consensus of the day about the welfare state, claiming the credit belonged to the Conservatives in a speech to the Conservative Association annual general meeting. Biographer Charles Moore states:

Neither at the beginning of her career nor when she was prime minister, did Margaret Thatcher ever reject the wartime foundations of the welfare state, whether in health, social policy or education. In this she was less radical than her critics or some of her admirers supposed. Her concern was to focus more on abuse of the system, on bureaucracy and union militancy, and on the growth of what later came to be called the dependency culture, rather than on the system itself.

Historian Richard Vinen is sceptical about there being Thatcherism before Thatcher.

=== Ideological definition ===
In 1976, a year into Thatcher's leadership, the Conservatives published The Right Approach. This provided the intellectual basis for Thatcherism - reduced spending and taxes, stronger rule of law, "self help", improving educational standards and committing to the European Community.

Thatcher saw herself as creating a libertarian movement, rejecting traditional Toryism. Thatcherism is associated with libertarianism within the Conservative Party, albeit one of libertarian ends achieved by using strong leadership. British political commentator Andrew Marr has called libertarianism the "dominant, if unofficial, characteristic of Thatcherism". Whereas some of her heirs, notably Michael Portillo and Alan Duncan, embraced this libertarianism, others in the Thatcherite movement such as John Redwood sought to become more populist.

Some commentators have argued that Thatcherism should not be considered properly libertarian. Noting the tendency towards strong central government in matters concerning the trade unions and local authorities, Andrew Gamble summarised Thatcherism as "the free economy and the strong state". Simon Jenkins accused the Thatcher government of carrying out a nationalisation of Britain. Libertarian political theorist Murray Rothbard did not consider Thatcherism to be libertarian and heavily criticised Thatcher and Thatcherism, stating that "Thatcherism is all too similar to Reaganism: free-market rhetoric masking statist content". Stuart McAnulla said that Thatcherism is actually liberal conservatism, a combination of liberal economics and a strong state.

=== Thatcherism as a form of government ===
Another important aspect of Thatcherism is the style of governance. Britain in the 1970s was often referred to as "ungovernable". Thatcher attempted to redress this by centralising a great deal of power to herself as prime minister, often bypassing traditional cabinet structures (such as cabinet committees). This personal approach also became identified with personal toughness at times, such as the Falklands War in 1982, the IRA bomb at the Conservative conference in 1984 and the miners' strike in 1984–85.

Sir Charles Powell, the foreign affairs private secretary to the Prime Minister (1984–1991 and 1996), described her style as such: "I've always thought there was something Leninist about Mrs Thatcher which came through in the style of government: the absolute determination, the belief that there's a vanguard which is right and if you keep that small, tightly knit team together, they will drive things through ... there's no doubt that in the 1980s, No. 10 could beat the bushes of Whitehall pretty violently. They could go out and really confront people, lay down the law, bully a bit".

=== Criticism ===
By 1987, after Thatcher's successful third re-election, criticism of Thatcherism increased. At the time, Thatcher claimed it was necessary to tackle the "culture of dependency" by government intervention to stop socialised welfare. In 1988, she caused controversy when she made the remarks, "You do not blame society. Society is not anyone. You are personally responsible" and, "Don't blame society – that's no one." These comments attracted significant criticism, including from other conservatives due to their belief in individual and collective responsibility. In 1988, Thatcher told the party conference that her third term was to be about 'social affairs'. During her last three years in power, she attempted to reform socialised welfare, differing from her earlier stated goal of "rolling back the state".

== Economic positions ==
=== Thatcherite economics ===
Thatcherism is associated with the economic theory of monetarism, notably put forward by Friedrich Hayek's The Constitution of Liberty which Thatcher had banged on a table while saying "this is what we believe". In contrast to previous government policy, monetarism placed a priority on controlling inflation over controlling unemployment. According to monetarist theory, inflation is the result of there being too much money in the economy. It was claimed that the government should seek to control the money supply to control inflation. By 1979, it was not only the Thatcherites arguing for stricter inflation control. The Labour Chancellor Denis Healey had already adopted some monetarist policies, such as reducing public spending and selling off the government's shares in BP.

Moreover, it has been argued that the Thatcherites were not strictly monetarist. A common theme centres on the Medium Term Financial Strategy, issued in the 1980 budget, which consisted of targets for reducing the growth of the money supply in the following years. After overshooting many of these targets, the Thatcher government revised the targets upwards in 1982. Analysts have interpreted this as an admission of defeat in the battle to control the money supply. The economist C. F. Pratten claimed that "since 1984, behind a veil of rhetoric, the government has lost any faith it had in technical monetarism. The money supply, as measured by M3, has been allowed to grow erratically, while calculation of the public sector borrowing requirement is held down by the ruse of subtracting the proceeds of privatisation as well as taxes from government expenditure. The principles of monetarism have been abandoned".

Thatcherism is also associated with supply-side economics. Whereas Keynesian economics holds that the government should stimulate economic growth by increasing demand through increased credit and public spending, supply-side economists argue that the government should instead intervene only to create a free market by lowering taxes, privatising state industries and increasing restraints on trade unionism.

=== Trade union legislation ===
Reduction in the power of the trades unions was made gradually, unlike the approach of the Edward Heath government, and the most significant single confrontation with the unions was the National Union of Mineworkers (NUM) strike of 1984–1985, in which the miners' union was eventually defeated. Evidence shows that the Conservative Party and the NUM anticipated this confrontation with the trade unions. The outcome contributed to the resurgence of the power of capital over labour.

== Domestic and social positions ==
All too often the ills of this country are passed off as those of society. Similarly, when action is required, society is called upon to act. But society as such does not exist except as a concept. Society is made up of people. It is people who have duties and beliefs and resolve. It is people who get things done. [Thatcher] prefers to think in terms of the acts of individuals and families as the real sinews of society rather than of society as an abstract concept. Her approach to society reflects her fundamental belief in personal responsibility and choice. To leave things to society is to run away from the real decisions, practical responsibility and effective action.

— No. 10, Statement, The Sunday Times (10 July 1988)

=== Thatcherite morality ===
Thatcherism is associated with a conservative stance on morality. Sutcliffe-Braithwaite (2012) argues that Thatcherism married conservatism with free-market economics. Thatcherism did not propose dramatic new panaceas such as Milton Friedman's negative income tax. Instead, the goal was to create a rational tax-benefit economic system that would increase British efficiency while supporting a conservative social system based on traditional morality. There would still be a minimal safety net for the poor, but the major emphasis was on encouraging individual effort and thrift. Thatcherism sought to minimise the importance of welfare for the middle classes and reinvigorate Victorian bourgeois virtues. Thatcherism was family centred, unlike the extreme individualism of most neoliberal models. It had its roots in historical experiences such as Methodism and the fear of the too-powerful state that had troubled Hayek.

Norman Tebbit, a close ally of Thatcher, laid out in a 1985 lecture what he thought to be the permissive society that conservatives should oppose:

Bad art was as good as good art. Grammar and spelling were no longer important. To be clean was no better than to be filthy. Good manners were no better than bad. Family life was derided as an outdated bourgeois concept. Criminals deserved as much sympathy as their victims. Many homes and classrooms became disorderly; if there was neither right nor wrong there could be no basis for punishment or reward. Violence and soft pornography became accepted in the media. Thus was sown the wind; and we are now reaping the whirlwind.

Despite her association with social conservatism, Thatcher voted in 1966 to legalise homosexuality, one of the few Conservative MPs to do so. That same year, she also voted in support of legal abortion. However, in the 1980s during her time as prime minister, the Thatcher government enacted Section 28, a law that opposed the "intentional promotion" of homosexuality by local authorities and "promotion" of the teaching of "the acceptability of homosexuality as a pretended family relationship" in schools. In her 1987 speech to the Conservative Party conference, Thatcher stated:

Children who need to be taught to respect traditional moral values are being taught that they have an inalienable right to be gay ... All of those children are being cheated of a sound start in life—yes, cheated.

The law was opposed by many gay rights advocates such as Stonewall and OutRage!. Tony Blair's Labour government repealed it in 2000 (in Scotland) and 2003. Conservative prime minister David Cameron later issued an official apology for previous Conservative policies on homosexuality, specifically the introduction of the controversial Section 28 laws from the 1980s, viewing past ideological views as "a mistake" with his ideological direction.

Regarding feminism Thatcher said "The feminists hate me, don't they? And I don't blame them. For I hate feminism. It is poison" and "I owe nothing to Women's lib".

=== Sermon on the Mound ===
In May 1988, Thatcher gave an address to the General Assembly of the Church of Scotland. In the speech, Thatcher offered a theological justification for her ideas on capitalism and the market economy. She said, "Christianity is about spiritual redemption, not social reform", and she quoted St Paul by saying, "If a man will not work he shall not eat". Choice played a significant part in Thatcherite reforms, and Thatcher said that choice was also Christian, stating that Jesus Christ chose to lay down his life and that all individuals have the God-given right to choose between good and evil.

== Foreign policy ==
=== Atlanticism ===
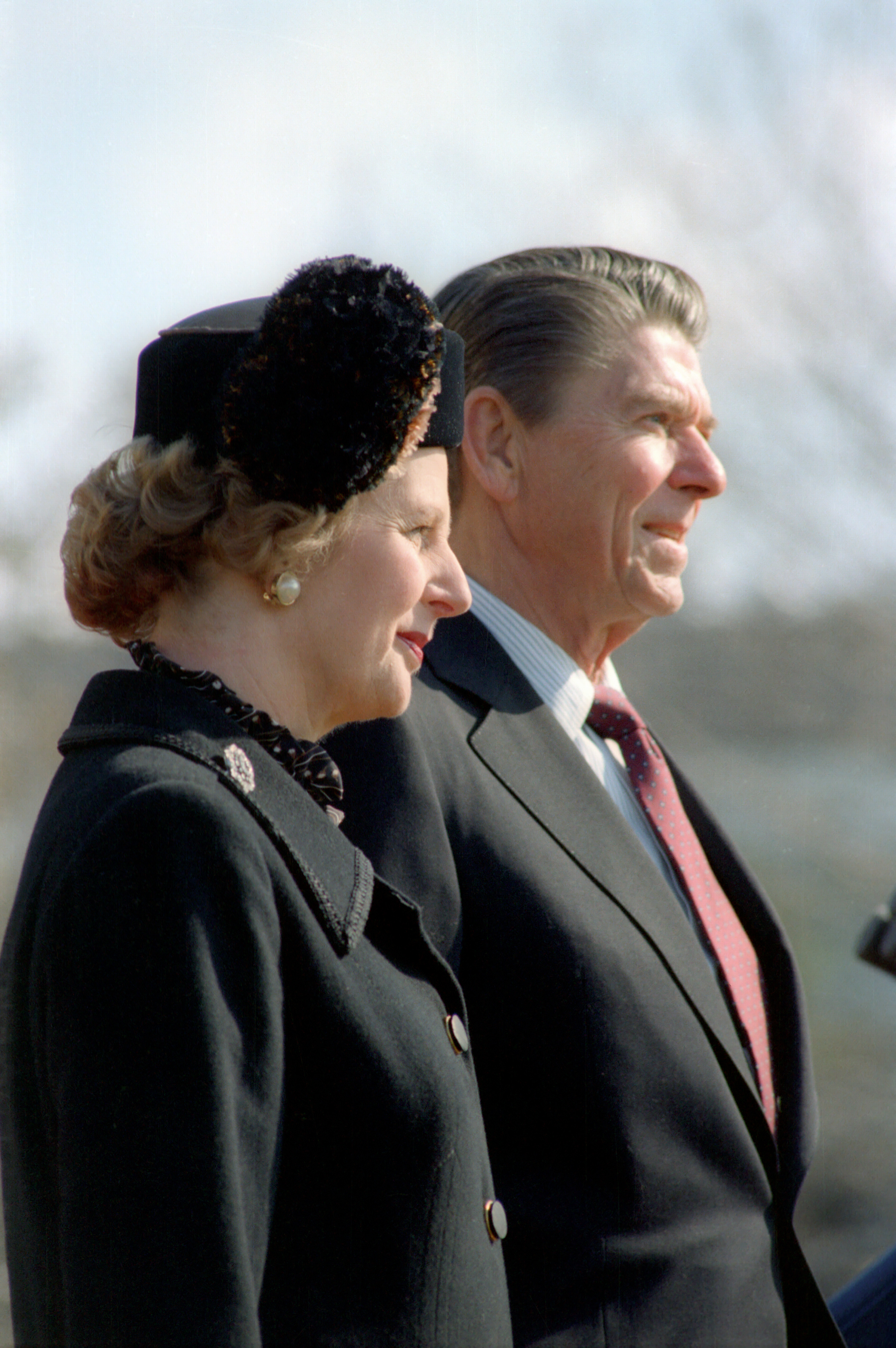
Thatcher and Reagan publicly appear together on the South Lawn in 1981.

Whilst Thatcher was prime minister, she greatly embraced transatlantic relations with US president Ronald Reagan. She often publicly supported Reagan's policies even when other Western allies were not as vocal. For example, she granted permission for American planes to use British bases for raids, such as the 1986 United States bombing of Libya, and allowed American cruise missiles and Pershing missiles to be housed on British soil in response to Soviet deployment of SS-20 nuclear missiles targeting Britain and other Western European nations.

=== Europe ===
While Euroscepticism has for many become a characteristic of Thatcherism, Thatcher was far from consistent on the issue, only becoming truly Eurosceptic in the last years of her time as prime minister. Thatcher supported Britain's entry into the European Economic Community in 1973, campaigned for a "Yes" vote in the 1975 referendum and signed the Single European Act in 1986.

Towards the end of the 1980s, Thatcher (and so Thatcherism) became increasingly vocal in its opposition to allowing the European Community to supersede British sovereignty. In a famous 1988 Bruges speech, Thatcher declared: "We have not successfully rolled back the frontiers of the state in Britain, only to see them reimposed at a European level, with a European superstate exercising a new dominance from Brussels".

== Dispute over the term ==
It is often claimed that the word Thatcherism was coined by cultural theorist Stuart Hall in a 1979 Marxism Today article. However, this is not true as Tony Heath first used the term in an article he wrote that appeared in Tribune on 10 August 1973. Writing as Tribune's education correspondent, Heath wrote: "It will be argued that teachers are members of a profession which must not be influenced by political considerations. With the blight of Thatcherism spreading across the land that is a luxury that only the complacent can afford". Although the term had been widely used before then, not all social critics have accepted the term as valid, with the High Tory journalist T. E. Utley believing "There is no such thing as Thatcherism".

Utley contended that the term was a creation of Thatcher's enemies who wished to damage her by claiming that she had an inflexible devotion to a particular set of principles and also by some of her friends who had little sympathy for what he called "the English political tradition" because it facilitated "compromise and consensus". Utley argued that a free and competitive economy, rather than being an innovation of Thatcherism, was one "more or less permanent ingredient in modern Conservative philosophy":

It was on that principle that Churchill fought the 1945 election, having just read Hayek's Road to Serfdom. [...] What brought the Tories to 13 years of political supremacy in 1951 was the slogan 'Set the people free'. [...] There is absolutely nothing new about the doctrinal front that she presents on these matters. [...] As for 'privatisation', Mr. Powell proposed it in [...] 1968. As for 'property-owning democracy', I believe it was Anthony Eden who coined the phrase.

In foreign policy, Utley claimed Thatcher's desire to restore British greatness did not mean "primarily a power devoted to the preservation of its own interests" but that she belonged "to that militant Whig branch of English Conservatism...her view of foreign policy has a high moral content". In practical terms, he claimed this expressed itself in her preoccupation with "the freedom of Afghanistan rather than the security of Ulster".

Such leftist critics as Anthony Giddens claim that Thatcherism was purely an ideology and argue that her policies marked a change which was dictated more by political interests than economic reasons:

Rather than by any specific logic of capitalism, the reversal was brought about by voluntary reductions in social expenditures, higher taxes on low incomes and the lowering of taxes on higher incomes. This is the reason why in Great Britain in the mid 1980s the members of the top decile possessed more than a half of all the wealth. To justify this by means of economic "objectivities" would be an ideology. What is at play here are interests and power.

The Conservative historian of Peterhouse, Maurice Cowling, also questioned the uniqueness of "Thatcherism". Cowling claimed that Thatcher used "radical variations on that patriotic conjunction of freedom, authority, inequality, individualism and average decency and respectability, which had been the Conservative Party's theme since at least 1886". Cowling further contended that the "Conservative Party under Mrs Thatcher has used a radical rhetoric to give intellectual respectability to what the Conservative Party has always wanted".

Historians Emily Robinson, Camilla Schofield, Florence Sutcliffe-Braithwaite and Natalie Thomlinson have argued that by the 1970s, Britons were keen on defining and claiming their individual rights, identities and perspectives. They demanded greater personal autonomy and self-determination and less outside control. They angrily complained that the establishment was withholding it. They argue that this shift in concerns had helped cause Thatcherism and was incorporated into its appeal.

== Criticism ==
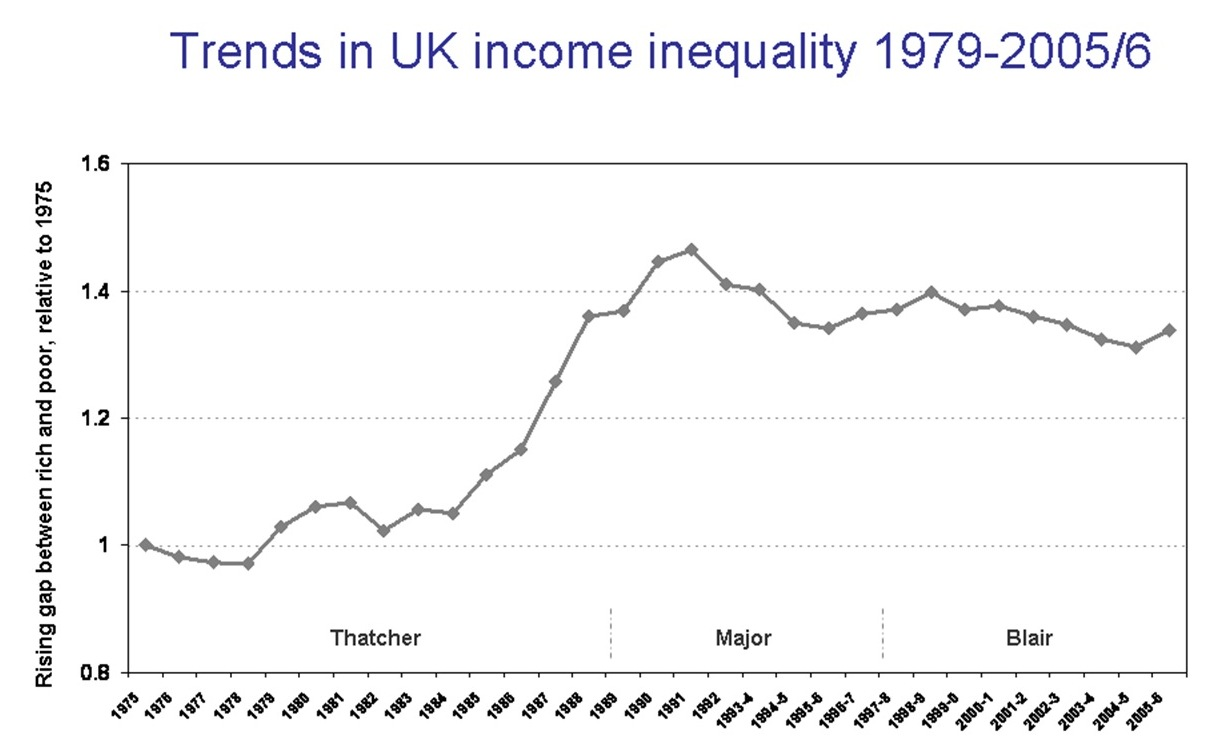
Trends in British income inequality, 1979–2009

Critics of Thatcherism claim that its successes were obtained only at the expense of great social costs to the British population. There were nearly 3.3 million unemployed in Britain in 1984, compared to 1.5 million when she first came to power in 1979, though that figure had reverted to 1.6 million by the end of 1990.

While credited with reviving Britain's economy, Thatcher also was blamed for spurring a doubling of the relative poverty rate. Britain's childhood-poverty rate in 1997 was the highest in Europe. When she resigned in 1990, 28% of the children in Great Britain were considered to be below the poverty line, a number that kept rising to reach a peak of nearly 30% during the government of Thatcher's successor, John Major. During her government, Britain's Gini coefficient reflected this growing difference, going from 0.25 in 1979 to 0.34 in 1990, at about which value it remained for the next 20 years, under both Conservative and Labour governments.

== Thatcher's legacy ==
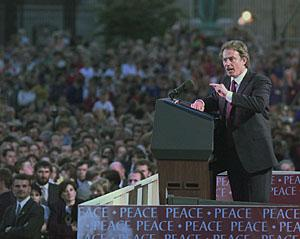
Prime Minister Tony Blair, shown speaking in 1998 while visiting Armagh, has publicly proclaimed his support for various aspects of Thatcherism despite leading an opposing political party years after Thatcher left office.

The extent to which one can say Thatcherism has a continuing influence on British political and economic life is unclear. It could be said that a "post-Thatcherite consensus" exists in modern British political culture, especially regarding monetary policy. In the 1980s, the now defunct Social Democratic Party adhered to a "tough and tender" approach in which Thatcherite reforms were coupled with additional welfare provisions. Neil Kinnock, leader of the Labour Party from 1983 to 1992, initiated Labour's rightward shift across the political spectrum by largely concurring with the economic policies of the Thatcher government. The New Labour governments of Tony Blair and Gordon Brown were described as "neo-Thatcherite" by some on the left since many of their economic policies mimicked those of Thatcher.

Thatcherism was continued under the administration of Thatcher's successor as prime minister, John Major, with policies such as the elimination of wages councils and the privatisation of British Rail carried out. As one study has noted

His government, consolidating Britain’s unhealthy position on the extreme right wing of Western Europe, maintained the Thatcherite contempt for public service and hostility to the state. In the grip of fundamentalist dogma, in 1993 it even abolished the wages councils, which was the very antithesis of One-Nation politics. Wages councils had been set up by Winston Churchill to protect the lowest paid. Their abolition was fully in line with the Thatcher Government’s equally retrograde withdrawal – unique in the developed world – of all employment protection from the young in 1986; but reducing the pay of the lowest paid seemed a curious way for the Government to further its declared ambition of creating a classless society.

According to the same study, Major “kept to the Thatcherite path; in many ways his government became even more right-wing than hers.”

In 1999, twenty years after Thatcher had come to power, the Conservative Party held a dinner in London Hilton to honour the anniversary. During the dinner, several speeches were given. To Thatcher's astonishment, the Conservatives had decided that it was time to shelve the economic policies of the 1980s. The Conservative Party leader at the time, William Hague, said that the party had learnt its lesson from the 1980s and called it a "great mistake to think that all Conservatives have to offer is solutions based on free markets". His deputy at the time Peter Lilley elaborated and said, "belief in the free market has only ever been part of Conservatism".

In 2002, Peter Mandelson, who had served in Blair's Cabinet, famously declared that "we are all Thatcherites now".

Most major British political parties today accept the trade union legislation, privatisations and general free market approach to government that Thatcher's governments installed. Before 2010, no major political party in the United Kingdom had committed to reversing the Thatcher government's reforms of the economy, although in the aftermath of the Great Recession from 2007 to 2012, the then Labour Party leader Ed Miliband had indicated he would support stricter financial regulation and industry-focused policy in a move to a more mixed economy. Although Miliband was said by the Financial Times to have "turned his back on many of New Labour's tenets, seeking to prove that an openly socialist party could win the backing of the British electorate for the first time since the 1970s", in 2011 Miliband had declared his support for Thatcher's reductions in income tax on top earners, her legislation to change the rules on the closed shop and strikes before ballots, as well as her introduction of Right to Buy, saying Labour had been wrong to oppose these reforms at the time.

Moreover, the UK's comparative macroeconomic performance has improved since implementing Thatcherite economic policies. Since Thatcher resigned as British prime minister in 1990, British economic growth was, on average, higher than the other large European economies (i.e. Germany, France and Italy). Such comparisons have been controversial for decades.

Tony Blair wrote in his 2010 autobiography A Journey that "Britain needed the industrial and economic reforms of the Thatcher period". He described Thatcher's efforts as "ideological, sometimes unnecessarily so" while also stating that "much of what she wanted to do in the 1980s was inevitable, a consequence not of ideology but of social and economic change." Blair additionally labelled these viewpoints as a matter of "basic fact".

On the occasion of the 25th anniversary of Thatcher's 1979 election victory, the BBC surveyed opinions which opened with the following comments:

To her supporters, she was a revolutionary figure who transformed Britain's stagnant economy, tamed the unions and re-established the country as a world power. Together with US presidents Reagan and Bush, she helped bring about the end of the Cold War. But her 11-year premiership was also marked by social unrest, industrial strife and high unemployment. Her critics claim British society is still feeling the effect of her divisive economic policies and the culture of greed and selfishness they allegedly promoted.

From the viewpoint of late 2019, the state of British politics showed that Thatcherism had suffered a "sad fate", according to The Economist Bagehot column. As a political-economic philosophy, Thatcherism was originally built upon four components: commitment to free enterprise; British nationalism; a plan to strengthen the state by improving efficiency; and a belief in traditional Victorian values especially hard work and civic responsibility. The tone of Thatcherism was establishment bashing, with intellectuals a prime target, and that tone remains sharp today. Bagehot argues that some Thatcherisms have become mainstream, such as a more efficient operation of the government. Others have been sharply reduced, such as insisting that deregulation is always the answer to everything. The dream of restoring traditional values by creating a property-owning democracy has failed in Britain – ownership in the stock market has plunged, as has the proportion of young people who are homebuyers. Her privatisation programme became suspect when it appeared to favour investors rather than customers.

Recent developments in Britain reveal a deep conflict between Thatcherite free enterprise and Thatcherite nationalism. She wanted to reverse Britain's decline by fostering entrepreneurship – but immigrants have often played an important role as entrepreneurial leaders in Britain. Bagehot says Britain is "more successful at hosting world-class players than producing them." In the course of the Brexit process, nationalists denounced European controls over Britain's future, while business leaders often instead prioritise the maintenance of their leadership of the European market. Thatcher herself showed a marked degree of Euroscepticism when she warned against a "European superstate".

Evaluating whether or not political conservatives of the 2020s continue the neoliberal legacy of prior years, Theresa May's Conservative Party election manifesto has attracted attention due to its inclusion of the lines: "We do not believe in untrammelled free markets. We reject the cult of selfish individualism. We abhor social division, injustice, unfairness and inequality." Journalists such as Ross Gittins of The Sydney Morning Herald have cited this as a move away from the standard arguments made historically by Thatcherites and related advocates.

== See also ==
- Blairism
- Brownism
- Gladstonian liberalism
- History of the Conservative Party (UK)
- New public management
- Orbanomics
- Pinochetism
- Powellism
- Privatisation of British Rail
- Water privatisation in England and Wales
