= Euromod =

European Union Tax Benefit Model

Euromod, officially stylised as EUROMOD, is a European Union-wide tax-benefit model originally maintained, developed and managed by the Institute for Social and Economic Research at the University of Essex. Since 2021 Euromod is maintained, developed and managed by the Joint Research Centre of the European Commission, in collaboration with Eurostat and national teams from the EU countries. It belongs to the class of static microsimulation models and has modules for all 27 EU member states (and the UK until 2021).

== Summary of the model ==
Euromod allows researchers and analysts to simulate, evaluate and compare the impact of tax-benefit policies in terms of households' disposable, as well as computing poverty, inequality and budgetary indicators. The model can be used for analysing the effects of already existing policies and to evaluate tax-benefit policy reforms. The model also offers extended functionalities that allow the user, among other features, to compute marginal tax rates and net replacement rates (as indicators of work incentives), apply tax compliance adjustments, construct hypothetical families or change labour market conditions. Euromod is intended to produce models and results that are comparable across EU countries.

Euromod is an open access platform, with active users across Europe but also the Global South where the platform is used with Southmod models. It is based on three key components: software, model (coded policy rules) and the input microdata. The policy rules embedded in Euromod are updated to the existing policies on the 30 June of each year. The underlying microdata are based on EU-SILC and set to Euromod's standard set of protocols.

Since April 2021, the Euromod website offers the Euromod-JRC interface, a simplified version of EUROMOD in which users can change parameters of personal income taxes and social insurance contributions. Researchers and policy analysts can access it upon request.

== Publications ==
Euromod has been producing several studies and have released hundreds of publications about various policy changes across the EU. Euromod's most common types of publication are books, research papers, parliamentary papers and journal articles. The subjects of the publications vary from income dynamics and poverty, to welfare benefits and taxation.

== Selected list of works ==
- An update, a correction, and an extension, of an evaluation of an illustrative Citizen’s Basic Income scheme - addendum to EUROMOD working paper EM12/17 (Torry. M, 22 March 2018)
- Income tax in Scotland: 2017 update (Berthier. A and Hudson. N, 15 Dec 2017)
- Incentives to enter the labour market in Latvia (Pluta. A, 2 May 2016)
- Inequalities within couples: market incomes and the role of taxes and benefits in Europe (Figari. F, Immervoll. H, Levy.H and Sutherland. H, 1 Nov 2007)
