= Matti Pohjola =

Finnish economist (born 1950)

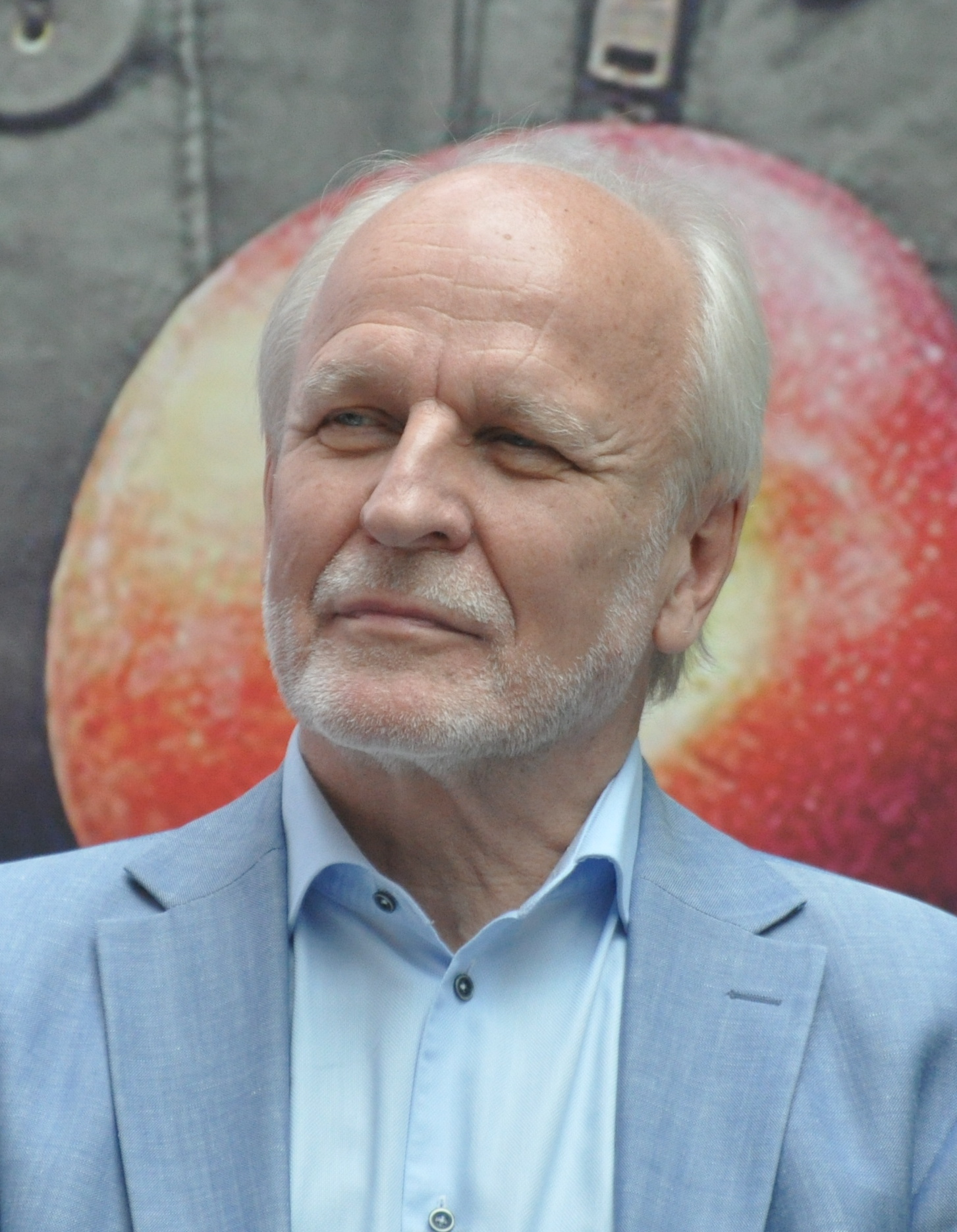
Matti Pohjola in 2016

Matti Tapani Pohjola (born 4 November 1950) is a Finnish economist. He is a noted economist working on the economics of growth, productivity, technological change, and most notably information and communications technology. He is a professor at the Helsinki School of Economics since 1992 and is the editor of the Finnish Economic Journal. Pohjola is the deputy director of the World Institute for Development Economics Research (WIDER), United Nations University, and since 1992 Professor of Economics, Helsinki School of Economics and Business Administration.

Born in Huruksela, Kymi, he graduated in 1973 from Tampere University as Master of Science in Social Sciences (yhteiskuntatieteiden maisteri). He obtained in 1976 from Tampere University the postgraduate degree of Licentiate of Science in Social Sciences. He holds a PhD Degree from the University of Cambridge, since 1981.

Pohjola has contributed to a number of research areas in economics, including applications of chaotic dynamic systems and dynamic game theory, labour economics, environmental economics, and economic growth. He has recently edited a volume entitled Information Technology, Productivity, and Economic Growth: International Evidence and Implications for Economic Development published by Oxford University Press (2001) and a special issue on the New Economy to be published in Information Economics and Policy in June 2002. His current research focuses on the impacts of the New Economy on productivity and economic growth and on the factors affecting the adoption and diffusion of information and communication technology.

== Selected publications ==
- Social Corporatism: A Superior Economic System?, Clarendon Press 1991 (edited with Jukka Pekkarinen and Bob Rowthorn)
