= Kunal Sen =

Economist

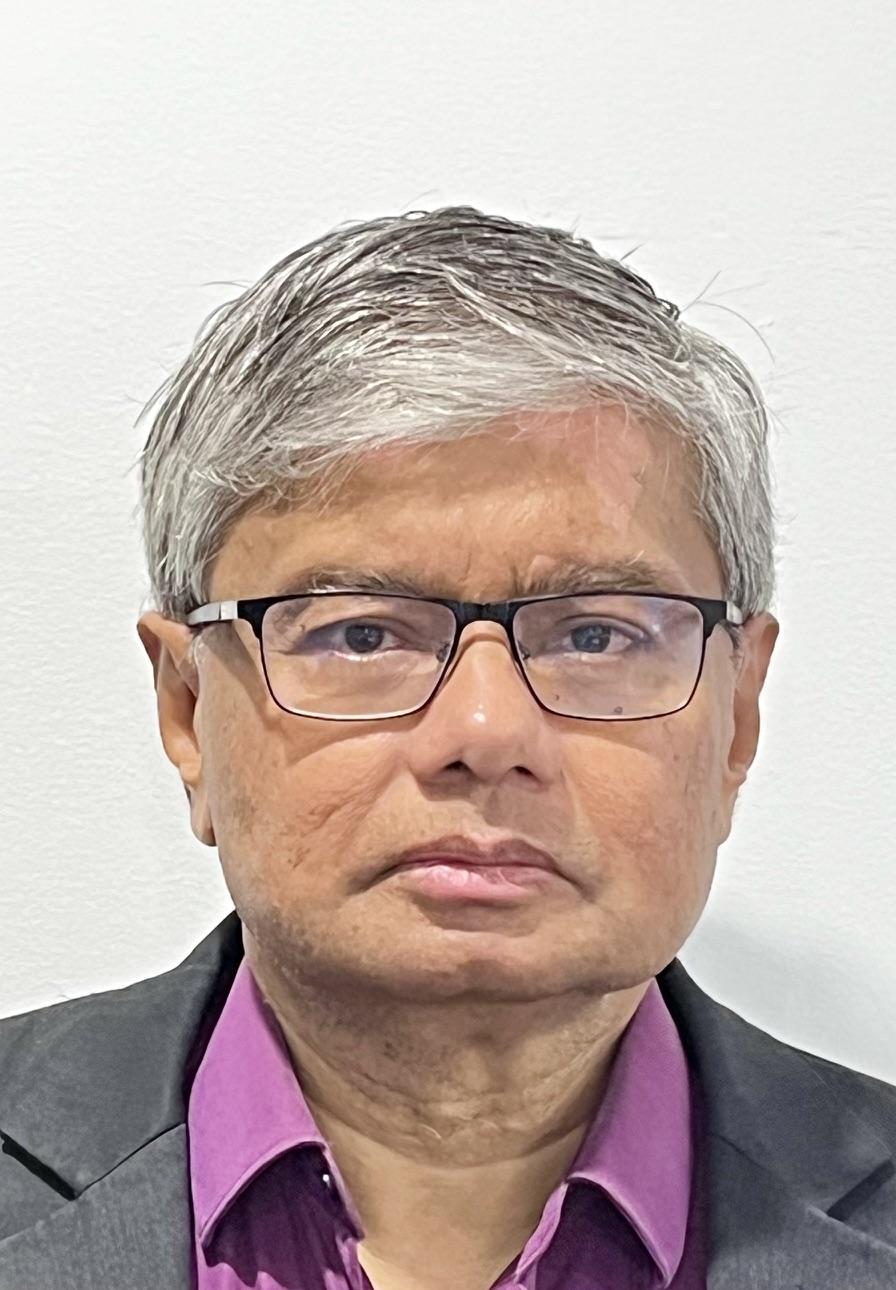
- Born: Kunal Kalyan Sen

Academic background
- Education: Rutgers University (PhD, MA); Jawaharlal Nehru University (MA); University of Bombay (BA)

Academic work
- Discipline: Development economics
- Institutions: University of Manchester; United Nations University World Institute for Development Economics Research
- Website: Information at IDEAS / RePEc

Kunal Sen is an economist whose work is in development economics. He is a professor of development economics at the University of Manchester and served as director of the United Nations University World Institute for Development Economics Research (UNU-WIDER).

== Education ==
Sen received his PhD in economics from Rutgers University in 1989. He previously completed a Master of Arts in economics at Rutgers University in 1987. He earned an MA in economics from Jawaharlal Nehru University in 1984 and a BA in economics and mathematics from the University of Bombay in 1982.

== Academic career ==
Sen worked at the Indira Gandhi Institute of Development Research in Mumbai, where he was assistant professor and later associate professor between 1990 and 1995. He subsequently held academic positions at the Australian National University, Massey University in New Zealand, and the University of East Anglia, where he worked from 1999 to 2006.

In 2006, Sen joined the University of Manchester as professor of development economics at the Global Development Institute. He served as research director there from 2011 to 2016.

In January 2019, Sen was appointed director of the United Nations University World Institute for Development Economics Research (UNU-WIDER), a United Nations research institute based in Helsinki.

Sen has been a Research Fellow at the IZA Institute of Labor Economics since 2006. From 2020 to 2022, he held the Dr. V. R. V. Rao Chair Professorship at the Institute for Social and Economic Change in India.

In 2025, he was elected a Founding Fellow of the Royal Economic Society.

== Publications ==
Sen has authored, co-authored, edited, and co-edited books on development economics, political economy, structural transformation, labour markets, and economic policy.

=== Authored and co-authored books ===
- Pathways to Development: From Politics to Power (with S. Hickey). Oxford: Oxford University Press, 2024.
- Varieties of Structural Transformation: Patterns, Determinants and Consequences. Cambridge: Cambridge University Press, 2023.
- The Political Economy of India’s Growth Episodes (with S. Kar). London: Palgrave Macmillan, 2016.
- Out of the Shadows? The Informal Sector in Post-Reform India (with R. Raj). Oxford: Oxford University Press, 2016.
- Trade Policy, Inequality and Performance in Indian Manufacturing. London: Routledge, 2008.
- International Competitiveness, Investment and Finance: A Case-study of India (with A. G. Kumar and R. Vaidya). London: Routledge, 2003.
- Saving, Investment and Growth in India (with P. Athukorala). Delhi: Oxford University Press, 2002.
- Policy Regimes and Industrial Competitiveness: A Comparative Study of East Asia and India (with P. Agrawal, S. Gokarn, V. Mishra and K. S. Parikh). Basingstoke: Macmillan, 2000.
- The Process of Financial Liberalization in India (with R. R. Vaidya). Delhi: Oxford University Press, 1997.
- Economic Restructuring in East Asia and India: Perspectives on Policy Reform (with P. Agrawal, S. Gokarn, V. Mishra and K. S. Parikh). Basingstoke: Macmillan; New York: St. Martin's Press, 1995.

=== Edited and co-edited books ===
- The Domestic Savings Shortfall in Sub-Saharan Africa: What Can Be Done About It? (with R. Ngugi). Oxford: Oxford University Press, 2025.
- COVID-19 and the Informal Economy: Impact, Recovery and the Future (with M. Chen and M. Rogan). Oxford: Oxford University Press, 2024.
- Tasks, Skills and Institutions: The Changing Nature of Work and Inequality (with C. Gradin, P. Lewandowski and S. Schotte). Oxford: Oxford University Press.
- Climbing the Job Ladder? Transforming Informal and Formal Work in a Dynamic Context (with G. Field, T. H. Gindling, M. Danquah and S. Schotte). Oxford: Oxford University Press, 2022.
- The Developer’s Dilemma: Structural Transformation, Inequality Dynamics and Inclusive Growth (with A. Alisjahbana, A. Sumner and A. Yusuf). Oxford: Oxford University Press, 2022.
- Social Mobility in Developing Countries: Concepts, Methods and Determinants (with V. Iversen and A. Krishna). Oxford: Oxford University Press, 2021.
- Deals and Development: The Political Dynamics of Growth Episodes (with L. Pritchett and E. Werker). Oxford: Oxford University Press, 2018.
- The Politics of Inclusive Development: Interrogating the Evidence (with S. Hickey and B. Bukenya). Oxford: Oxford University Press, 2014.
- Productivity in Indian Manufacturing: Measurements, Methods and Analysis (with V. Kathuria and R. Raj). Delhi: Routledge India, 2014.
- State-Business Relations and Economic Development in Africa and India. London: Routledge, 2013.
- Research Collection on Institutions and Governance in Developing Countries. Cheltenham: Edward Elgar, 2013.
