= Gustav Ranis =

- Born: 24 October 1929
- Died: 15 October 2013 (aged 83)
- Spouse: Ray Lee

Academic background
- Education: Brandeis University

Gustav Ranis (24 October 1929 – 15 October 2013) was a leading development economist and the Frank Altschul Professor Emeritus of International Economics at Yale University.

== Career ==
He was a part of the first ever graduating class at Brandeis University in 1952. He was Director of the Yale Center for International and Area Studies (1995 to 2003), a Carnegie Corporation Scholar (2004 to 2006), Director of the Economic Growth Center at Yale (1967 to 1975), Assistant Administrator for Program and Policy at USAID (1965 to 1967), and Director of the Pakistan Institute of Development Economics (1958 to 1961).

== Academic output ==
Ranis first made his name with the 1964 book "Development of the Labor Surplus Economy: Theory and Policy," (an extension and formalisation of the Lewis model)which he coauthored with John Fei and which has been credited with opening up new literature and debate in the development field. He has written over 20 books and 300 theoretical and policy-oriented development economics articles.

== Personal life ==
Ranis is survived by his wife of 55 years, Rachel Ranis; his children, Michael and Jonathan Ranis and Bettina Altschuler; and his grandchildren, Benjamin and Daniel Altschuler, Hanna and Sasha Ranis.

== Selected bibliography ==
=== Books ===
- Ranis, Gustav; Stewart, Frances; Angeles-Reves, Edna (1990). Linkages in developing economies: a Philippine study. San Francisco, California: International Center for Economic Growth ICS Press distributor. ISBN 9781558150492.
- Ranis, Gustav; Hu, Sheng-Cheng; Chu, Yun-Peng (1999). The political economy of Taiwan's development into the 21st century. Cheltenham, UK: Northampton, Massachusetts Elgar. ISBN 9781858988795.

=== Journal articles ===
- Ranis, Gustav; Stewart, Frances; Ramirez, Alejandro (February 2000). "Economic growth and human development" (PDF). World Development. 28 (2): 197–219. doi:10.1016/S0305-750X(99)00131-X.

== Festschrift ==
Gustav Ranis, Gary R. Saxonhouse, T. N. Srinivasan (1999) Development, duality, and the international economic regime: essays in honor of Gustav Ranis, University of Michigan Press, ISBN 0-472-10982-0, ISBN 978-0-472-10982-1
