= World Institute for Development Economics Research =

Coordinates: 35.6623718°N 139.7083631°E

World Institute for Development Economics Research (UNU-WIDER)
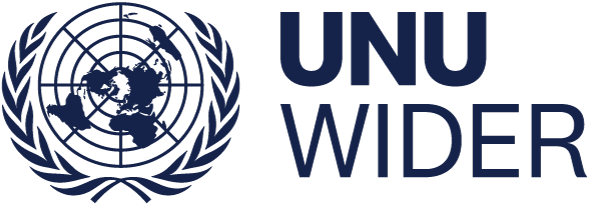
- Formation: February 1984; 42 years ago
- Type: Research Institute
- Headquarters: Helsinki, Finland
- Director: Kunal Sen
- Parent organization: United Nations; United Nations University
- Website: www.wider.unu.edu

The United Nations University World Institute for Development Economics Research (UNU-WIDER) is part of the United Nations University (UNU). UNU-WIDER, the first research and training centre to be established by the UNU, is an international academic organization set up with the aim of promoting peace and progress by bringing together leading scholars from around the world to tackle pressing global problems.

== UNU-WIDER ==
=== The establishment of the UNU and UNU-WIDER ===
In 1969 the UN Secretary-General U Thant suggested that the time had arrived when serious consideration might be given to establishing an international university. An international university, the Secretary-General said, would be devoted to the Charter objectives of peace and progress. It would be staffed with professors from many nations and all parts of the world. The university would thus serve to break down the barriers that created misunderstanding and mistrust between nations and cultures.

The UNU was established by the General Assembly on 6 December 1973 to be an international community of scholars engaged in research, advanced training, and the dissemination of knowledge related to the pressing global problems of human survival, development, and welfare. The UNU started its activities in 1975 at its headquarters in Tokyo.

The UNU established UNU-WIDER following a brainstorming of leading economists of the day outlining the need for an institution to undertake a sustained effort for a more comprehensive understanding of the forces at work in the global economic system and their consequences for specific developing country situations and at the international level

In November 1983 Finland offered to host UNU-WIDER in its capital Helsinki, providing premises for the Institute and an endowment fund of US$25 million.

UNU-WIDER was founded by a Host Country Agreement and Memorandum of Understanding signed by the then Foreign Minister of Finland, Paavo Väyrynen, and the Rector of UNU, Soedjatmoko, on 4 February 1984.

=== Mandate ===
UNU-WIDER's mandate is to undertake multidisciplinary research and policy analysis on structural changes affecting the living conditions of the world's poorest people; provide a forum for professional interaction and advocacy of policies leading to equitable and environmentally sustainable growth; and train researchers and government officials in the field of economic and social policy making.

=== History ===
Following the approval by the Finnish Parliament, the Host Country Agreement came into force on 20 June 1984. Lal Jayawardena was appointed the inaugural director on 1 March 1985, and the institute was initially located at premises at Annankatu 42C in Helsinki, Finland.

==== Research ====
During its existence, UNU-WIDER has produced a large amount of research on the broad topics of poverty, inequality and growth. The Research Programme changes every two years. It is constructed by the Director in consultation with the UNU-WIDER Board following extensive discussions with UNU-WIDER research staff, leading economists, and donor government representatives. Areas of research have spanned all facets and levels of development economics including topics like finance and trade; economic growth and the environment; women and development; international migration and refugees; microsimulation of tax-benefit reforms (SOUTHMOD); social impact of privatization; fiscal policies for growth; transition and institutions; development aid; global trends in inequality and poverty; personal assets from a global perspective and many more. During the mid-1980s the Horn of Africa was confronting widespread famine. As this coincided with the launch of the very first UNU-WIDER research programme, the theme of "Hunger and Poverty: The Poorest Billion" was included in it. This research was directed by Jean Drèze and Nobel Laureate Amartya Sen. It has been argued that the resulting three volumes of study transformed the thinking on issues of famine and food security at the time. In the late 1990s, WIDER undertook a major study of income inequality trends throughout the world under the direction of its then-director Giovanni Andrea Cornia. The study uncovered so-called "new causes" of inequality linked to excessively liberal economic policies and the way in which economic reforms have been implemented. Furthermore, the study produced the first version of the World Income Inequality Database (WIID). It is a comprehensive and freely available database of statistics on inequality trends within countries. Since 2009, under director Finn Tarp, UNU-WIDER has concentrated widely on the "triple crisis" of food, climate change and finance.

==== Nobel laureates in economics associated with UNU-WIDER ====
Elinor Ostrom, 2009

Paul Krugman, 2008

Joseph E. Stiglitz, 2001

Amartya Sen, 1998

John C. Harsanyi, 1994

Douglass C. North, 1993

Robert W. Fogel, 1993

Robert M. Solow, 1987

==== Other Nobel laureates and Prize winners connected with UNU-WIDER activities ====
Martti Ahtisaari (Nobel Peace Prize, 2008)

Edmund S. Phelps (2006)

James A. Mirrlees (1996)

==== Controversy ====
During the late 1980s and early 1990s, the press reported on various financial and organisational irregularities about UNU-WIDER and its management.

=== Institutional framework ===
The Council of UNU determines the principles and policies guiding the whole university. The Board of UNU-WIDER, comprising well-known economists, policy-makers, and social scientists from all over the world, advises on research and other activities. The Director of UNU-WIDER has overall responsibility for the research and management of the Institute and implements the research programme in keeping with guidelines set out by the Board and the Council. UNU functions as a decentralized 'network of networks' with an interdisciplinary and global perspective. The UNU system comprises the UNU Centre in Tokyo and a worldwide network of Research and Training Centres and Programmes (RTC/Ps) assisted by numerous associated and cooperating institutions.

=== Organization ===
Research is coordinated by Helsinki-based staff consisting of resident researchers and support staff. A network of external project directors, located at their universities or institutes, contribute to current projects along with several hundred network participants around the world. This group includes research staff from the UNU, UN, ECLAC, UNDP, FAO, International Labour Organization, the United Nations Conference on Trade and Development (UNCTAD), UNICEF and the Bretton Woods institutions including the World Bank and International Monetary Fund. Visiting scholars typically spend two to three months in Helsinki working on topics related to the current research programme. The internship programme allows PhD students in economics or related social sciences to spend two to three months at UNU-WIDER.

==== Funding ====
UNU-WIDER was founded with contributions from the governments of Finland and India, the Swedish International Development Cooperation Agency (Sida), and the Nippon Foundation (Sasakawa Foundation, Japan). Income from the endowment fund has largely covered core expenditures. Supplementary financial support for research and other activities has been received from the governments of Denmark, Finland, Italy, Norway, Sweden and the United Kingdom; the Arab Fund for Economic and Social Development( Kuwait), Ford Foundation, Yrjö Jahnsson Foundation (Finland), MacArthur Foundation, Oracle (Finland), Rockefeller Foundation, SITRA (Finnish National Fund for Research and Development), United Nations Department of Economic and Social Affairs (UN-DESA), United Nations Development Programme (UNDP), and the World Bank. In-kind contributions, such as assistance in hosting workshops and conferences, are also regularly received from various universities, United Nations agencies and other international organizations.

=== Directors ===
- Kunal Sen (2019–incumbent) (India)
- Finn Tarp (2009–2018) (Denmark)
- Anthony Shorrocks (2001–2009) (United Kingdom)
- Matti Pohjola (2000) (Finland)
- Giovanni Andrea Cornia (1996–1999) (Italy)
- Mihály Simai (1993–1995) (Hungary)
- Lal Jayawardena (1985–1993) (Sri Lanka)

== Activities ==
=== Research ===
The Research Programme is reformulated every two years by the Institute's director in consultation with the UNU-WIDER Board following extensive discussions with UNU-WIDER research staff, leading economists in the UN and elsewhere, and donor government representatives. Research projects are led by scholars (Research Fellows and External Project Directors) who elaborate on the proposals before the projects are launched. Each project typically invites selected authors to write original research papers which are later presented and discussed at project workshops and conferences. In some cases, a more general 'call for papers' may be announced on the Institute's website. Typically, two large development conferences are organized annually in Helsinki, each of which brings together around 100 individuals to present papers and discuss current problems on development issues. Participants are usually researchers and policymakers from the academic, government, and development communities. Special attempts are made to encourage researchers from developing countries to achieve a gender balance at these events. The research studies are published as WIDER working papers. The outcomes also often include a policy brief and an article in the WIDERAngle.

=== Annual lecture ===
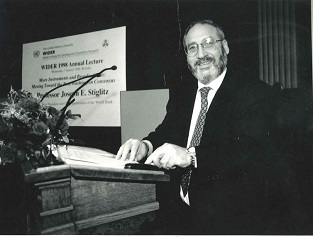
Joseph Stiglitz presenting the WIDER Annual Lecture

The WIDER Annual Lecture is delivered by a senior scholar who has made a significant contribution to the field of economics of development and transition.

2023 Pinelopi Goldberg - Globalization in Crisis – Confronting a New Economic Reality

2022 Daron Acemoglu - In the name of progress

2021 Bina Agarwal - Women's Struggle for Land in South Asia: Can Legal Reforms Trump Social Norms?

2020 Mark Malloch-Brown - UN at 75: Slow Death or a New Direction

2019 Santiago Levy - Informality – Addressing the Achilles Heel of Social Protection in Latin America

2018 Ernest Aryeetey - The Political Economy of Structural Transformation – Has Democracy Failed African Economies?

2017 Sabine Alkire - How Are People Poor? – Measuring Global Progress Towards Zero Poverty and the SDGs

2016 Martin Ravallion - Direct Interventions Against Poverty in Poor Places

2015 Amartya Sen - Three Decades of Change in Development

2014 C. Peter Timmer - Managing Structural Transformation Post-2015

2013 Martti Ahtisaari - Egalitarian Principles – The Foundation for Sustainable Peace

2012 Lant Pritchett - Folk and the Formula: Fact and Fiction in Development

2011 Justin Yifu Lin - From Flying Geese to Leading Dragons: New Opportunities and Strategies for Structural Transformation in Developing Countries

2010 José Antonio Ocampo - Reforming the International Monetary and Financial Architecture

2009 Ronald Findlay - The Trade-Development Nexus in Theory and History

2009 Deepak Nayyar - Developing Countries in the World Economy: The Future in the Past?

2008 Kemal Derviş - The Climate Change Challenge

2006 Angus Deaton - Global Patterns of Income and Health: Facts, Interpretations, and Policies

2005 Nancy Birdsall - The World is not Flat: Inequality and Injustice in our Global Economy

2004 Dani Rodrik - Rethinking Growth Strategies

2003 Kaushik Basu - Global Labour Standards and Local Freedoms

2002 Jeffrey G. Williamson - Winners and Losers in Two Centuries of Globalization

2001 Frances Stewart - Horizontal Inequality: A Neglected Dimension of Development

2000 Jagdish N. Bhagwati - Globalization and Appropriate Governance

1999 A. B. Atkinson - Is Rising Income Inequality Inevitable? A Critique of the Transatlantic Consensus

1998 Joseph E. Stiglitz - More Instruments and Broader Goals: Moving Toward the Post-Washington Consensus

1997 Douglass C. North - The Contribution of the New Institutional Economics to an Understanding of the Transition Problem

== Ranking ==
In 2010 UNU-WIDER was ranked as 7th best International Development Think Tank by the University of Pennsylvania Think Tanks and Civil Societies Program.

== See also ==
- SOUTHMOD

== Video clips ==
- UNU Video Portal
- UNU YouTube channel
- UNU Vimeo channel
