= Southmod =

Tax-benefit model

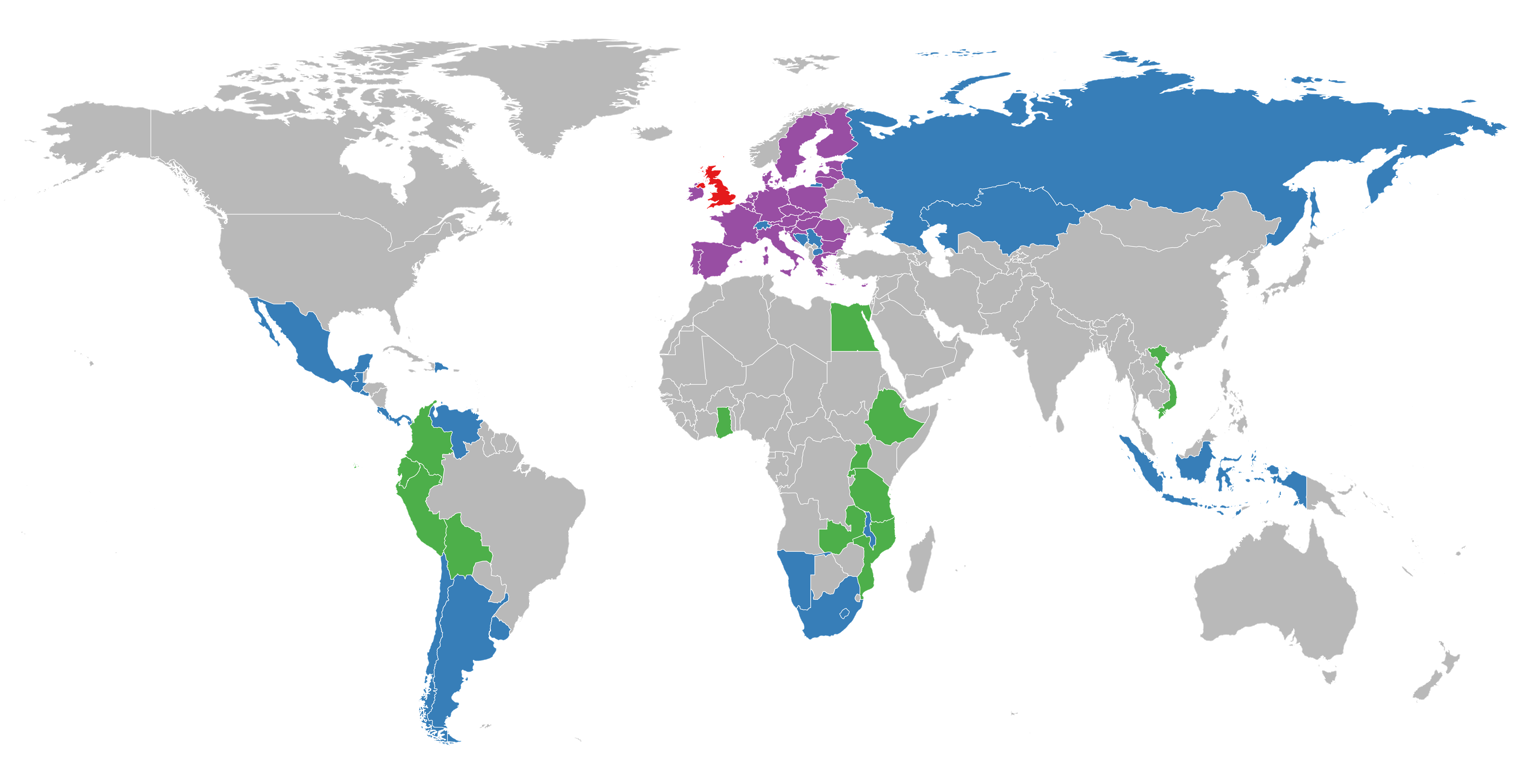
SOUTHMOD EUROMOD for EU-27 UKMOD Other EUROMOD-based models World map showing tax-benefit microsimulation models built on the EUROMOD platform, per the Joint Research Centre (European Commission) (retrieved June 2026). The countries in green belong to the SOUTHMOD model family, the rest represent other EUROMOD-based microsimulation models, including EUROMOD models for countries of the European Union.

SOUTHMOD is a collection of tax-benefit models for countries in the Global South, maintained and managed by the United Nations University World Institute for Development Economics Research (UNU-WIDER) and partners. It belongs to the class of static microsimulation models and currently has 13 modules for eight countries in Africa (Egypt, Ethiopia, Ghana, Mozambique, Rwanda, Mainland Tanzania and Zanzibar, Uganda, Zambia), four in Latin America (Bolivia, Colombia, Ecuador, Peru), and one in Southeast Asia (Vietnam). The models are freely available for non-commercial research use.

SOUTHMOD draws inspiration from EUROMOD, a tax-benefit microsimulation model designed for European Union member states and managed by the Joint Research Centre of the European Commission.

== SOUTHMOD model bundle ==
SOUTHMOD is a bundle of tax-benefit microsimulation models developed on the open-access EUROMOD software platform. Apart from the platform, each country module in SOUTHMOD is based on two key components: coded policy rules (the model) and input microdata. The policy rules are updated to the existing policies once per year based on relevant national legislation. The underlying input datasets are derived from nationally representative household surveys.

SOUTHMOD allows researchers and analysts to simulate, evaluate and compare the impact of tax-benefit policies in several developing countries in terms of disposable income and household consumption. Users can also compute various poverty, inequality and budgetary indicators. The model makes it possible to evaluate the effects of both existing policies and tax-benefit policy reforms.

SOUTHMOD is highly standardized, as it is intended to produce results that are comparable across countries, including those in the EU-wide EUROMOD model. The standardization has been achieved by harmonizing the input datasets and the coding of policy rules according to common protocols.

== SOUTHMOD project at UNU-WIDER ==
The tax-benefit models are developed and maintained under the SOUTHMOD – simulating tax and benefit policies for development project, an international collaboration between UNU-WIDER, the International Inequalities Institute at LSE, the Southern African Social Policy Research Insights (SASPRI), and researchers from the countries for which the models have been built.

In addition to model development, the SOUTHMOD project is concerned with building capacity in the host countries to encourage the use of microsimulation techniques among academics and policymakers. Research under the project promotes using the models to analyse the distributional and fiscal effects of tax-benefit policy reforms in the Global South.

== Publications ==
SOUTHMOD models have been used for producing a number of studies evaluating various policy reforms across developing countries. SOUTHMOD's most common types of publication are research papers and journal articles. The subjects of the publications vary from income dynamics and poverty to social protection benefits and taxation.

== Selected list of works ==
- Decoster, A., Pirttilä, J., Sutherland, H. and Wright, G. (2019). SOUTHMOD: Modelling tax-benefit systems in developing countries. International Journal of Microsimulation, 12(1): 1–12.
- McLennan, D., Noble, M., Wright, G., Barnes, H. and Masekesa, F. (2021). Exploring the quality of income data in two African household surveys for the purpose of tax-benefit microsimulation modelling: Imputing employment income in Tanzania and Zambia. WIDER Working Paper 134/2021. Helsinki: UNU-WIDER.
- Gasior, K., Leventi, C., Noble, M., Wright, G. and Barnes, H. (2022). The distributional impact of tax and benefit systems in five African countries. International Journal of Sociology and Social Policy, 42(1/2): 92–105.
- Lastunen, J., Rattenhuber, P., Adu-Ababio, K., Gasior, K., Jara, H. X., Jouste, M., McLennan, D., Nichelatti, E., Oliveira, R. C., Pirttilä, J., Richiardi, M. and Wright, G. (2021). The mitigating role of tax and benefit rescue packages for poverty and inequality in Africa amid the COVID-19 pandemic. WIDER Working Paper 148/2021. Helsinki: UNU-WIDER.
- Sutherland, H. and Figari, F. (2013). EUROMOD: The European Union tax-benefit microsimulation model. International Journal of Microsimulation, 6(1): 4–26.
