= W. M. Gorman =

Irish economist and academic

- Born: 17 June 1923; Kesh, Northern Ireland
- Died: 12 January 2003 (aged 79); Oxford, England

Academic background
- Education: Trinity College Dublin
- Doctoral advisor: George Alexander Duncan

Academic work
- Institutions: Stanford University; Johns Hopkins University; London School of Economics; University of Oxford; University of Birmingham
- Doctoral students: Edwin Mills; Martin Feldstein; Tim Besley; Stephen Nickell; Anthony Shorrocks; James M. Poterba

William Moore "Terence" Gorman (17 June 1923 – 12 January 2003) was an Irish economist and academic. He was predominantly a theorist and is most famous for his work on aggregation and separability of goods, and in this context he developed his famous Gorman polar form. Gorman's career saw him teach at University of Birmingham, Oxford, and the London School of Economics. He was honoured with the Presidency of the Econometric Society in 1972. His work was often highly technical and theoretical in nature, which made him incomprehensible to many of his contemporaries, but his keen eye for applications has given his work a lasting influence on modern economics.

== Early life ==
Gorman was born in Kesh in County Fermanagh, Northern Ireland, on 17 June 1923. He spent his early childhood in Lusaka, Rhodesia, where his African nanny called him Terence, saying that William was not a proper Irish name; he was subsequently known as Terence, or 'Terry', throughout his life. After his father was shot dead when Gorman was only four years old, he returned with his mother and her staff to her family estate in County Fermanagh, Northern Ireland, where he was brought up.

He attended Mount Temple School in Rathgar, and Foyle College in Derry before moving on to Trinity College Dublin, in 1941, where he was elected a Scholar in mathematics in 1943. From 1943 to 1946, he interrupted his studies to serve in the Royal Navy as a rating and then petty officer, before returning to graduate in 1948 in economics and in 1949 in mathematics. While at Trinity, he met his future wife, Dorinda. Gorman was highly influenced by Trinity Professor George A. Duncan, as well as by Professor James Davidson at Foyle College.

== Academic career ==
He began his academic career at the University of Birmingham in England, where he taught from 1949 to 1962. Birmingham, at that time, was a leading centre for theoretical research, employing professors including Frank Hahn, and Maurice McManus. It was during this period that what is now called Gorman polar form was rigorously introduced in an article entitled, "On a class of preference fields," published in the journal Metroeconomica, in August 1961.

After Birmingham, he held the chair of economics at Oxford from 1962, and subsequently the chair at the London School of Economics in 1967, where he introduced an American-style mathematical economics programme. He was a fellow of Nuffield College at Oxford from 1979, a senior research fellow in 1984 and an emeritus fellow in 1990. He also spent some time in the United States as a visiting fellow, when he was engaged in research at the Iowa, Johns Hopkins, the North Carolina, and at Stanford.

After retirement, he continued to live in Oxford, although he spent his summers in County Cork, until in his last years illness impaired his mobility.

== Approach to economics ==
Gorman credited his early education at Foyle College and Trinity College Dublin for teaching him "to think of mathematics and economics as styles of thought, not collections of theorems," and his experience at Birmingham taught him "to think of the social sciences as a unity with history as one way of holding them together". With this foundation, Gorman's theory was based both in empirical research and on the opinions and views of social scientists. Above all, however, Gorman was a mathematically talented economist, and his penchant for inter-disciplinarianism was only present in as much as that diversity presented him with tools to use or develop to explore the links between individual preferences and market behaviour.

== Awards, honors and honorary positions ==
- Presidency of the Econometric Society in 1972
- Fellowship of the British Academy
- Membership of Academia Europaea
- Honorary foreign membership of the American Academy of Arts and Sciences
- Honorary foreign membership of the American Economic Association
- Honorary doctorate from University College London
- Honorary doctorate from the University of Birmingham
- Honorary doctorate from the University of Southampton
- Honorary doctorate from the National University of Ireland in 1986
- Honorary fellowship from Trinity College, Dublin in 1990

== The Gorman Lectures ==
The Gorman Lectures in Economics, named after W. M. Gorman, is an annual event that takes place at the Department of Economics of University College London. The lectures are not confined to any sub-discipline of economics, and they are usually developed into a book, published by co-sponsor, Princeton University Press. The first lectures were delivered by the Nobel Laureate Professor James Heckman of Chicago University in December 2001. Avinash Dixit delivered the lectures in 2003. Robert M. Townsend of MIT delivered them in 2010. The 2011 lecture was given by Jerry Hausman of MIT and the 2013 lecture by Pierre-Andre Chiappori of Columbia.

== Resources ==
- On a class of preference fields, Metroeconomica, 13, August 1961, 53–56.
- "Probably the greatest Irish economist of his generation". www.irishtimes.com. Irish Times. 1 February 2003.
- Besley, Tim; Blackorby, Charles; Blundell, Richard (31 January 2003). "Terence Gorman". The Guardian.
