= Mihály Simai =

Hungarian economist

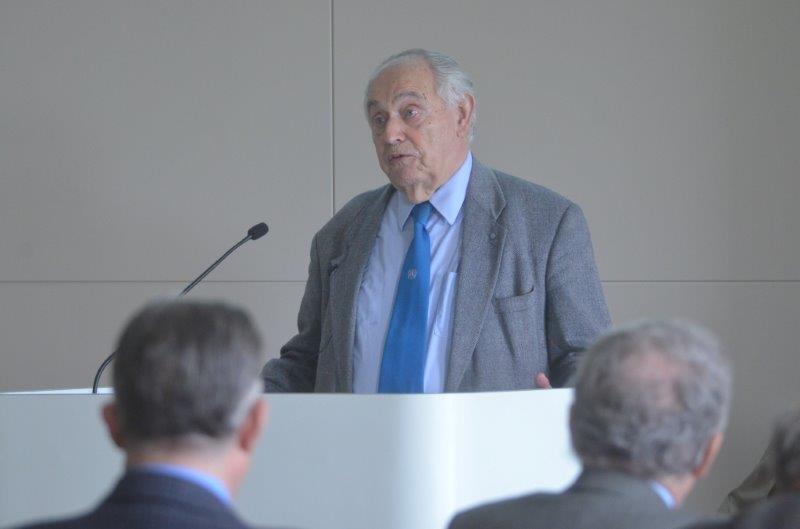
Mihály Simai

Mihály Simai (born 1930, in Budapest) is a noted Hungarian economist, researcher at the Institute for World Economics, Research Centre for Economic and Regional Studies of the Hungarian Academy of Sciences and professor at Corvinus University. His main area of specialization is world economics and the transformation of the world economic system. Previous posts include his directorship of the World Institute for Development Economics Research, Helsinki between 1993 and 1995, membership and presidency of the United Nations University Council between 1987 and 1993, directorship of the Institute for World Economics, Hungarian Academy of Sciences between 1987 and 1991, and vice-chairmanship of the UNICEF Governing Council between 1979 and 1985.

== Membership ==
- Member of the Hungarian Academy of Sciences
- Honorary President of the World Federation of United Nations Associations

== Awards ==
- UN Meritorious Service Award (1995)
- Széchenyi Prize (2007)

== Selected publications ==
- Simai, Mihály (1994) The future of global governance: managing risk and change in the international system, US Institute of Peace Press
- Simai, Mihály (ed.) (1999, 2007) The Democratic Process and the Market: Challenges of the Transition, Tokyo: United Nations University Press
- Simai, Mihaly (2001) The Age of Global Transformations: the Human Dimension, Budapest: Akadémiai Kiadó
