= Frances Stewart (economist) =

British economist (born 1940)

The Honourable Frances Julia Stewart
- Born: 4 August 1940 (age 86); Kendal, Westmorland, England, UK

Academic background
- Education: Somerville College, Oxford

Academic work
- Discipline: Development economics
- Institutions: Oxford Department of International Development (ODID), Oxford University
- Website: Information at IDEAS / RePEc

Notes
- Parents: Nicholas Kaldor (deceased); relatives: Mary Kaldor (sister)

Frances Julia Stewart (born 4 August 1940) is professor emeritus of development economics and director of the Centre for Research on Inequality, Human Security and Ethnicity (CRISE), University of Oxford. A pre-eminent development economist, she was named one of fifty outstanding technological leaders for 2003 by Scientific American. She was president of the Human Development and Capability Association from 2008 to 2010.

== Early life ==
Frances Stewart was born in Kendal on 4 August 1940, the daughter of Clarissa Goldschmidt, a history graduate from Somerville College, Oxford, and the economist Nicholas Kaldor. Her sister is the London School of Economics political scientist Mary Kaldor. The family moved to Cambridge in 1950.

She studied at Cambridgeshire High School for Girls and then gained a first-class degree from Oxford University in philosophy, politics and economics (PPE).

== Views ==
Stewart uses the concept to "virtuous circles" to express how development policies can target drivers of conflict like poverty, inequality, and inadequate social services. Virtuous circles begin with conflict prevention, which leads to enhanced development, a more secure state, and thus further enhanced development. Stewart notes that virtuous circles are fragile and that if economic growth excludes sufficiently large population segments, resulting horizontal inequality may break the virtuous circle and trigger conflict.

== Selected bibliography ==
=== Books ===
- Stewart, Frances (1977). Technology and underdevelopment. Boulder, Colorado: Westview Press. ISBN 9780891587187.
- Stewart, Frances (1985). Basic needs in developing countries. Baltimore, Maryland: Johns Hopkins University Press. ISBN 9780801823831.
- Stewart, Frances (1985). Planning to meet basic needs. London: Macmillan. ISBN 9780333340196.
- Lall, Sanjaya (1986). Stewart, Frances (ed.). Theory and reality in development: essays in honour of Paul Streeten. New York: St. Martin's Press. ISBN 9780312797263.
- Stewart, Frances; Jolly, Richard; Cornia, Giovanni A. (1987). Adjustment with a human face: protecting the vulnerable and promoting growth (a study by UNICEF). Vol. 1. Oxford, Oxfordshire; New York: Clarendon Press Oxford University Press. ISBN 9780198286103.
- Stewart, Frances; Jolly, Richard; Cornia, Giovanni A. (1987). Adjustment with a human face: ten country case studies (a study by UNICEF). Vol. 2. Oxford, Oxfordshire; New York: Clarendon Press Oxford University Press. ISBN 9780198286110.
- Stewart, Frances; Ranis, Gustav; Angeles-Reves, Edna (1990). Linkages in developing economies: a Philippine study. San Francisco, California: International Center for Economic Growth ICS Press distributor. ISBN 9781558150492.
- Stewart, Frances; Lall, Sanjaya; Wangwe, Samuel (1992). Alternative development strategies in subSaharan Africa. New York: St. Martin's Press. ISBN 9780312067380.
- Stewart, Frances (1992). North-South and South-South: essays on international economics. Basingstoke: Macmillan. ISBN 9780333490884.
- Stewart, Frances; FitzGerald, Valpy; and Associates (2001). War and underdevelopment: the economic and social consequences of conflict. Vol. 1. Oxford, New York: Oxford University Press. ISBN 9780199241866.
- Stewart, Frances; FitzGerald, Valpy; and Associates (2001). War and underdevelopment: country experiences. Vol. 2. Oxford, New York: Oxford University Press. ISBN 9780199241897.
- Stewart, Frances; Saith, Ruhi; Harriss-White, Barbara (2007). Defining poverty in the developing world. Basingstoke, England; New York: Palgrave Macmillan. ISBN 9780230516724.
- Stewart, Frances (2008). Horizontal inequalities and conflict: understanding group violence in multiethnic societies (Foreword by Kofi Annan). Basingstoke, England; New York: Palgrave Macmillan. ISBN 9780230245501.
- Stewart, Frances; Cornia, Giovanni A. (2014). Towards human development new approaches to macroeconomics and inequality. Oxford, Oxfordshire: Oxford University Press. ISBN 9780198706083.

=== Chapters in books ===
- Stewart, Frances (1994), "Are adjustment policies in Africa consistent with long-run development needs?", in Cornia, Giovanni A.; Helleiner, Gerald K. (eds.), From adjustment to development in Africa: conflict, controversy, convergence, consensus, New York, New York: St. Martin's Press, ISBN 9780333613627.
- Stewart, Frances; Ranis, Gustav; Samman, Emma (2009), "Country patterns of behavior on broader dimensions of human development", in Kanbur, Ravi; Basu, Kaushik (eds.), Arguments for a better world: essays in honor of Amartya Sen | Volume II: Society, institutions and development, Oxford New York: Oxford University Press, pp. 119–138, ISBN 9780199239979.

=== Journal articles ===
- Stewart, Frances (December 1991). "Are adjustment policies in Africa consistent with long-run development needs?". Development Policy Review. 9 (4): 413–436. doi:10.1111/j.1467-7679.1991.tb00196.x.
- Stewart, Frances; Cornia, Giovanni A. (September–October 1993). "Two errors of targeting". Journal of International Development. 5 (5): 459–496. doi:10.1002/jid.3380050503.
- Stewart, Frances; Ranis, Gustav; Ramirez, Alejandro (February 2000). "Economic growth and human development" (PDF). World Development. 28 (2): 197–219. doi:10.1016/S0305-750X(99)00131-X. hdl:10419/98286.
- Stewart, Frances; Deneulin, Séverine (June 2002). "Amartya Sen's contribution to development thinking" (PDF). Studies in Comparative International Development. 37 (2): 61–70. doi:10.1007/BF02686262. S2CID 154800212.
- Stewart, Frances; Saith, Ruhi; Laderchi, Caterina R. (2003). "Does it matter that we do not agree on the definition of poverty? A comparison of four approaches". Oxford Development Studies. 31 (3): 243–274. doi:10.1080/1360081032000111698. S2CID 14792333.
- Stewart, Frances (September 2011). "Inequality in political power: a fundamental (and overlooked) dimension of inequality". The European Journal of Development Research. 23 (4, special debate section: the politics of poverty and inequality): 541–545. doi:10.1057/ejdr.2011.23. S2CID 153662459.

=== Papers ===
- Stewart, Frances (2003). Horizontal inequalities: a neglected dimension of development (working paper 1). Queen Elizabeth House, University of Oxford, Oxfordshire, UK: Centre for Research on Inequality, Human Security and Ethnicity, CRISE. OCLC 50161455. Pdf version.

Educational offices
Preceded by Martha Nussbaum	President of the Human Development and Capability Association; September 2008 – September 2010	Succeeded by Kaushik Basu
