= Vladimir Popov (mathematician) =

Russian mathematician

Vladimir Leonidovich Popov
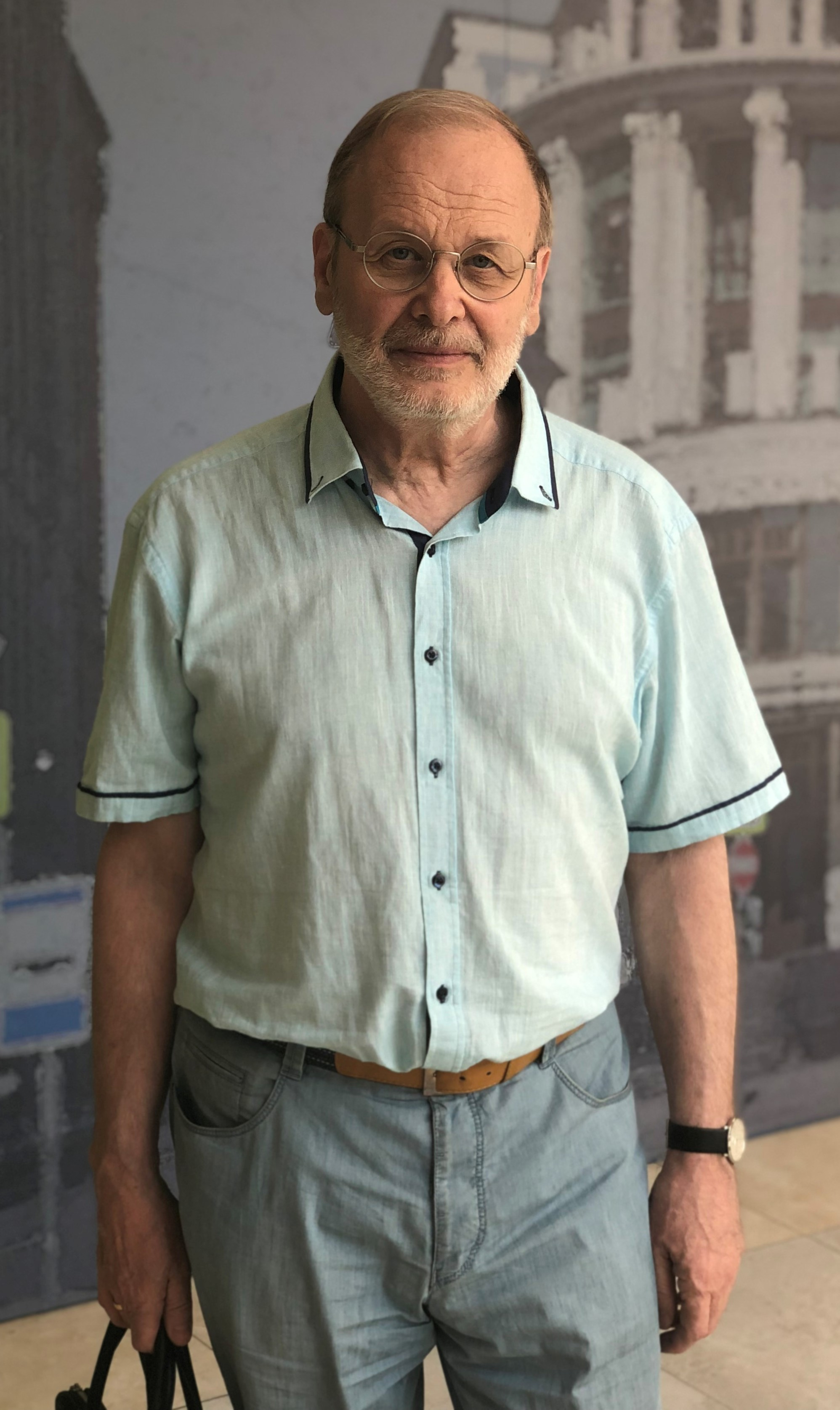
- Born: 3 September 1946 (age 80); Moscow

Academic work
- Discipline: Mathematics
- Website: Information at IDEAS / RePEc

Vladimir Leonidovich Popov (Russian: Влади́мир Леони́дович Попо́в; born 3 September 1946) is a Russian mathematician working in the invariant theory and the theory of transformation groups.

== Education and career ==
In 1969 he graduated from the Faculty of Mechanics and Mathematics of Moscow State University. In 1972 he received his Candidate of Sciences degree (PhD) with thesis Стабильность действия алгебраических групп и арифметика квазиоднородных многообразий (Stability of the action of algebraic groups and the arithmetic of quasi-homogeneous varieties). In 1984 he received his Russian Doctor of Sciences degree (habilitation) with thesis Группы, образующие, сизигии и орбиты в теории инвариантов (Groups, generators, syzygies and orbits in the theory of invariants).

He is a member of the Steklov Institute of Mathematics and a professor of the National Research University – Higher School of Economics. In 1986, he was an invited speaker at the International Congress of Mathematicians (Berkeley, USA), and in 2008–2010 he was a core member of the panel for Section 2, "Algebra" of the Program Committee for the 2010 International Congress of Mathematicians (Hyderabad, India).

In 1987 he published a proof of a conjecture of Claudio Procesi and Hanspeter Kraft. In 2006, with Nicole Lemire and Zinovy Reichstein, Popov published a solution to a problem posed by Domingo Luna in 1973.

== Awards ==
In 2012, he was elected a member of the inaugural class of Fellows of the American Mathematical Society which recognizes mathematicians who have made significant contributions to the field.

In 2016, he was elected a corresponding member of the Russian Academy of Sciences.

== Books ==
- Popov, Vladimir L. (1982). Discrete complex reflection groups. Utrecht: Communications of the Mathematical Institute Rijksuniversiteit Utrecht, Vol. 15.
- Popov, Vladimir L. (1992). Groups, generators, syzygies, and orbits in invariant theory. Providence RI: Translations of Mathematical Monographs, Vol. 100, Providence RI: Amer. Math. Soc. ISBN 0-8218-4557-8.
- Popov, V. L.; Vinberg, E. B. (1994). "Invariant Theory". Algebraic Geometry IV. Encyclopaedia of Mathematical Sciences. Vol. 55. Berlin; Heidelberg: Springer. pp. 123–278. doi:10.1007/978-3-662-03073-8_2. ISBN 978-3-642-08119-4.
- Popov, Vladimir L. (2004). Algebraic transformation groups and algebraic varieties: proceedings of the conference Interesting algebraic varieties arising in algebraic transformation group theory held at the Erwin Schrödinger Institute, Vienna, October 22-26, 2001. Berlin New York: Springer. ISBN 9783540208389.
