= Rolph van der Hoeven =

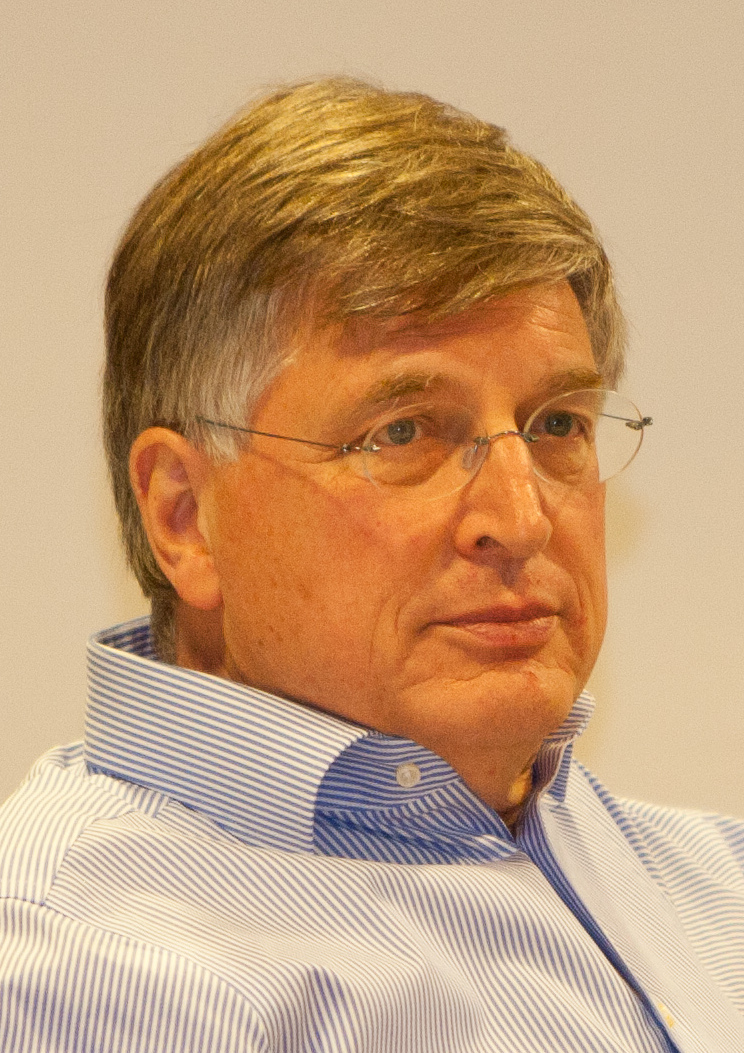
- Rolph van der Hoeven in 2011
- Born: 23 June 1948 (age 78)
- Citizenship: Dutch
- Education: PhD in development economics
- Alma mater: University of Amsterdam
- Occupations: Author, editor, professor
- Writing career
- Language: Dutch, English, German, French
- Years active: 1974–present
- Subject: Development economics
- Notable awards: Order of Orange-Nassau
- Website: rolph.vanderhoeven.ch

Rolph Eric van der Hoeven (born 23 June 1948) is emeritus professor on employment and development economics at the International Institute of Social Studies in The Hague and was appointed in 2009 as a member of the Committee on Development Cooperation of the International Advisory Council (AIV) to the Dutch Government. Van der Hoeven is a member of the Board of Trustees of the KNCV Tuberculosis Fund.

== Education ==
Van der Hoeven read econometrics at the University of Amsterdam where in 1969 he earned a MSc (Drs.) in 1974. He was awarded a PhD in development economics in 1987 with his thesis Planning for Basic Needs in Kenya: A Basic Needs Simulation Model at the Free University of Amsterdam.

== Career ==
Van der Hoeven has worked for over 30 years in various places in the world for UNICEF and International Labour Organization (ILO), where he was manager of the Technical Secretariat of the World Commission on the Social Dimension of Globalization, established by the International Labour Organization in Geneva. He previously held positions in the Employment Strategy Department of the ILO and with UNICEF in New York.

At the beginning of his career, he worked in Zambia and Ethiopia. In the 1980s following the introduction of structural adjustment programs by the World Bank and the IMF, Van der Hoeven researched and advocated that employment and other social concerns should be taken into account in structural adjustment programs. He played a role in the meeting on structural adjustment and employment of the ILO in 1987 and joined in 1988 the team in UNICEF, under the leadership of Sir Richard Jolly that worked on Adjustment with a Human Face.

In the early 1990s he returned to the ILO to manage the Interdepartmental Project on Structural Adjustment in the ILO.

Since 2000 he warns of the globalization effects on income inequality and employment, and became in 2002 the manager of the technical secretariat of the World Commission on the Social Dimension of Globalization.

Van der Hoeven has focused primarily on the functional inequality of income distribution between labor and capital, i.e. the share of gross domestic product received by workers and capital owners. Van der Hoeven argues that politicians should use the power of macroeconomic policies to reduce inequality. Van der Hoeven has called for an inequality goal based on the Palma index of inequality to be included in the post-2015 development agenda (SDGs).

== Select bibliography ==
- Jolly, Richard; et al. (2012). Be Outraged: There Are Alternatives. Oxford: Oxfam. ISBN 978-0-9573620-0-0. (collective work co-authored by R. van der Hoeven)
- van der Hoeven, Rolph (1988). Planning for Basic Needs: A Soft Option or a Solid Policy? A Basic Needs Simulation Model Applied to Kenya. Aldershot: Gower. ISBN 978-0-566-05680-2.
- Hopkins, Michael; van der Hoeven, Rolph (1983). Basic Needs in Development Planning. Aldershot: Gower. ISBN 978-0-566-00626-5.
