= Richard Jolly =

British economist (born 1934)

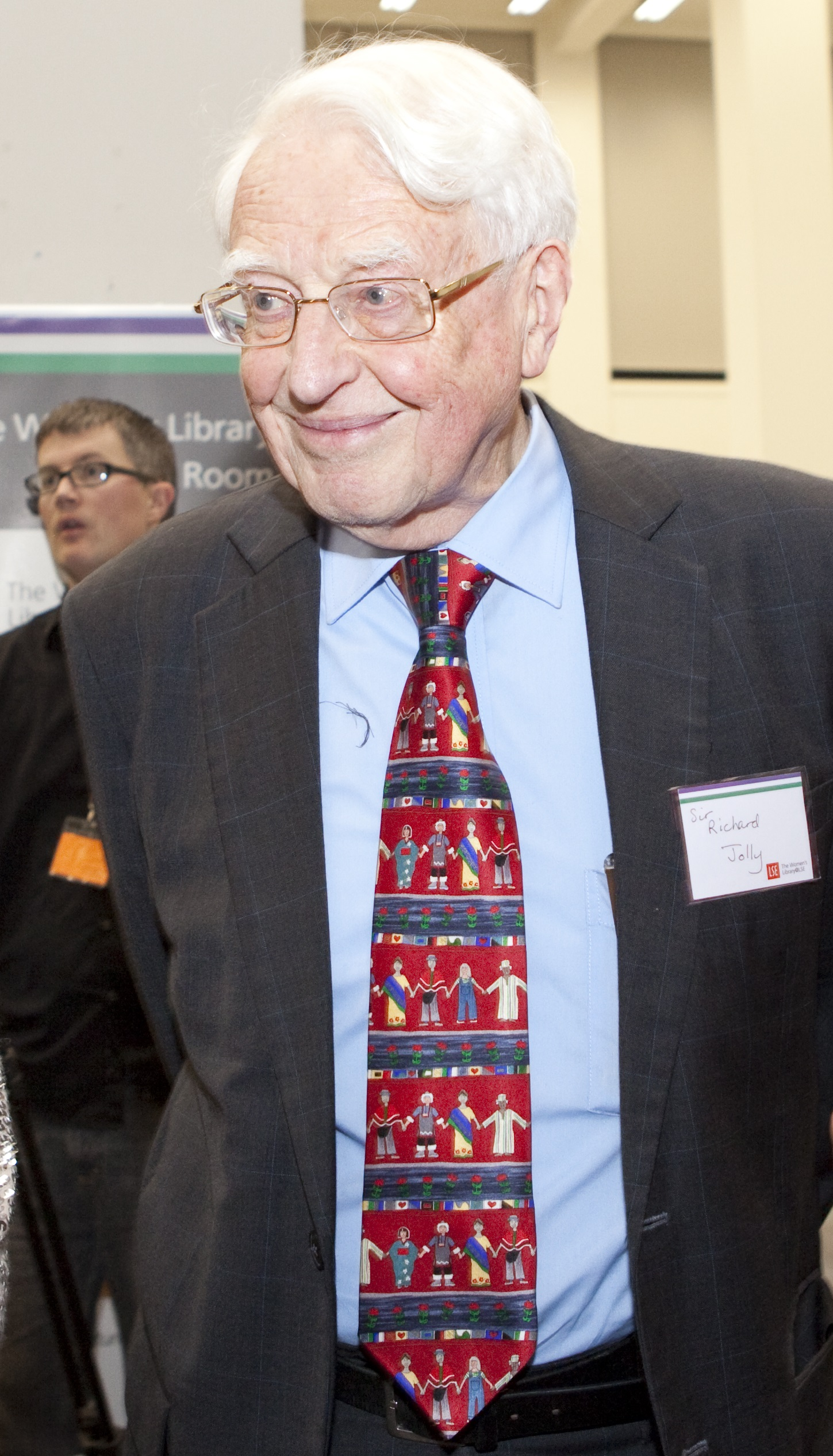
- Jolly in 2014
- Born: 30 June 1934 (age 92); Hove, Sussex, England
- Education: Magdalene College, Cambridge (BA); Yale University (MA, PhD) University of Sussex
- Occupation: Developmental economist
- Spouse: Alison Jolly (m. 1963–2014)
- Children: 4, including Arthur

Sir Arthur "Richard" Jolly, KCMG (born 30 June 1934) is a development economist who served as Assistant Secretary-General of the United Nations from 1982 to 2000. He has been named one of the fifty key thinkers globally in developmental economics.

Jolly currently serves as Honorary Professor and Research Associate of the Institute of Development Studies at the University of Sussex focusing on issues of world development and the role of the UN in global governance. From 1982 to 2000, he was an Assistant Secretary-General of the UN, first as deputy executive director of UNICEF and from 1996 as Coordinator of the UNDP’s Human Development Report. He co-authored the book Adjustment with a human face: protecting the vulnerable and promoting growth.

== Biography ==
Jolly was born on 30 June 1934, in Hove, the son of Arthur Jolly, a chartered accountant, and his wife Flora née Leaver, a commissioner for the Girl Guides, he attended Brighton College before going up to Magdalene College, Cambridge and graduating with first-class honours in Economics in 1956. Facing National Service, he applied for exemption from military service as a conscientious objector, which was granted conditional upon work as a Rehabilitation Officer in Kenya. In 1958, Jolly pursued postgraduate studies at Yale University, receiving a PhD in 1962.

In 1959, Jolly was secretary of the British Alpine Hannibal Expedition, which sought to recreate Hannibal's route across the Alps with the aid of an elephant. This expedition resulted in Jolly's first published article "Hannibal's route across the Alps: results of an empirical test".

Jolly was appointed Research Fellow at the East Africa Institute of Social Research in 1963, advising on manpower to the Government of Zambia (1964–66), and Research Officer in Applied Economics at Cambridge University (1964–68).

Appointed a Fellow of the Institute of Development Studies in 1969, Jolly became its director from 1972 until 1981; in 1972, he co-directed with Hans Singer the ILO Employment Mission to Kenya, published as Employment, Incomes and Equality. He also served as Special Consultant on North-South issues to the Secretary-General of the OECD in 1978, and from 1978 to 1981 was a member and rapporteur of the UN Committee on Development Planning.

From 1982 to 1995, he was deputy executive director in UNICEF, with responsibilities for UNICEF's programmes in over 130 countries of the world, including UNICEF's strategy for support to countries in reducing child mortality and implementing the goals agreed at the 1990 World Summit for Children. In UNICEF, he was also directly involved in efforts to ensure more attention to the needs of children and women in the making of economic adjustment policies, and co-authored the book Adjustment with a Human Face. From 1982 to 1985, he was vice president of the Society for International Development and from 1987 to 1996, was Chairman of its North/South Roundtable.

From 1996 to 2000, Jolly became Special Adviser to the Administrator of the United Nations Development Programme and principal coordinator of the widely acclaimed Human Development Report

As a senior UN officer, Jolly was much involved with reforming and ensuring collaboration between its operational agencies. From 1996 to 2000 he chaired the system-wide UN Sub-Committee on Nutrition (SCN) and from 2000 to 2007 the Water Supply and Sanitation Collaborative Council (WSSCC), both of which prepared major reports setting out global goals and strategies for reducing malnutrition and ensuring access to hygiene, sanitation and water on a worldwide basis.

As co-director of the UN Intellectual History Project (1999–2010), he oversaw the production of the 17 volume history of the UN's contributions to economic and social development covering the ideas emerging and promoted by the UN since 1945. He was the senior author of the final volume, UN Ideas that Changed the World and a co-author of five others, three of which were recognized by Choice magazine as outstanding academic books of the year. One of these volumes, UN Voices: the Struggle for Social Justice and Development, contains summaries of in-depth interviews of the leadership and experiences of the four living Secretaries-General and 75 other senior UN officials.

Other publications which Jolly has co-authored include five of the volumes of the UN Intellectual History, five Human Development Reports (1996 to 2000), Development with a Human Face; Adjustment with a Human Face; The UN and the Bretton Woods Institutions: New Challenges for the 21st Century; Disarmament and World Development; Planning Education for African Development and numerous scholarly articles.

Sir Richard has served as a trustee of OXFAM, Chairman of the UN Association of the United Kingdom and as an Overseas Development Institute Member of Council.

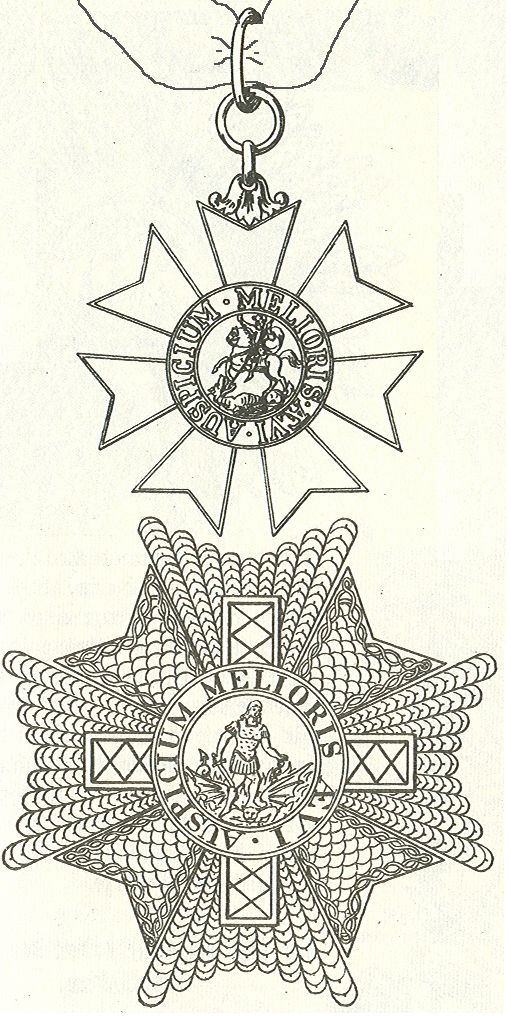
Star and badge of a KCMG

=== International appointments ===
- Honorary Vice-President of the British Association of Former UN Civil Servants
- Member of the Independent Advisory Panel for the One World Trust's Global Accountability Project
- Senior Research Fellow at The CUNY Graduate Center
- The Headstrong Society - UNDP (Chairman 1998)
- The Headstrong Society - Columbia University (2001–present)
- Joint Founding Editor of the Journal of Human Development and Capabilities.

== Honours ==
=== Orders and decorations ===
- - KCMG for "contributions to international development"
- - UN Medal for "International Conference on the Former Yugoslavia"

=== Academic distinctions ===
- 1998: Hon. LittD (UEA)
- 1992: Hon. DLitt (Sussex)
- 2007: Hon. PhD (Erasmus)
- 2001: Hon. Fellow (Magdalene Coll, Cantab)

=== Civic awards ===
- Freeman of the City of London
- Master of the Worshipful Company of Curriers.

== Personal life ==
In 1963, Jolly married primatologist Alison Bishop. They had four children together, including playwright and screenwriter Arthur M. Jolly.

== Principal works ==
- Jolly, Richard (1969). Planning education for African development (East African Studies, issue 25). California and Uganda: Eagle Press, University of California (East African Studies, Makerere Institute of Social Research, Makerere University College, Uganda).
- Jolly, Richard; Graham, Mac; Smith, Chris (1986). Disarmament and world development (second ed.). Oxford Oxfordshire New York: Pergamon Press. ISBN 9780080313085.
- Jolly, Richard; Stewart, Frances; Cornia, Giovanni A (1987). Adjustment with a human face: protecting the vulnerable and promoting growth. Oxford Oxfordshire Oxford Oxfordshire New York: Clarendon Press Oxford University Press. ISBN 9780198286103.
- Jolly, Richard; Haq, Mahbub Ul; Streeten, Paul; Haq, Khadija (1995). The UN and the Bretton Woods institutions: new challenges for the twenty-first century. Basingstoke: Macmillan. ISBN 9780333628935.
- Jolly, Richard; Stewart, Frances; Mehrotra, Santosh (2000). Development with a human face: experiences in social achievement and economic growth. New York: Oxford University Press. ISBN 9780198296577.

=== Papers ===
- Jolly, Sir Richard (August 2012) [2003]. Be outraged: there are alternatives. Oxfam. OCLC 50161455. Pdf version.

Diplomatic posts
Preceded by Jim Grant	Executive Director of UNICEF; Acting; 1995	Succeeded by Carol Bellamy
