= Erik Thorbecke =

American economist (1929–2026)

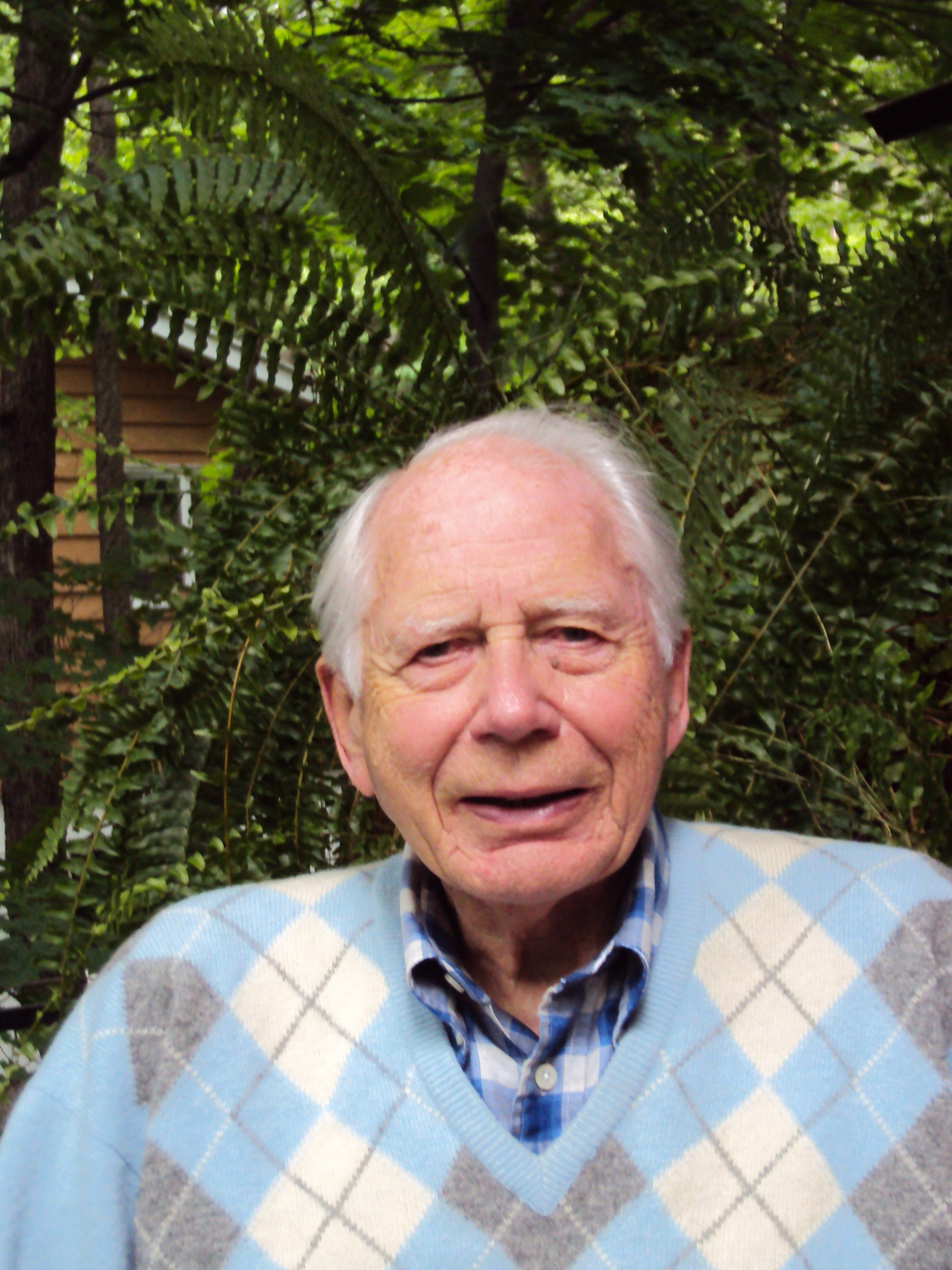
- Born: February 17, 1929
- Died: April 26, 2026 (aged 97)

Academic background
- Education: Erasmus University Rotterdam; University of California, Berkeley

Academic work
- Discipline: Development Economics
- Institutions: Iowa State University; Cornell University
- Notable ideas: Foster Greer Thorbecke inequality measure, Social Accounting Matrix

Erik Thorbecke (February 17, 1929 – April 26, 2026) was an American development economist. He was a co-originator of the widely used Foster-Greer-Thorbecke poverty measure and played a significant role in the development and popularization of Social Accounting Matrix. He was H. E. Babcock Professor of Economics, emeritus, and Graduate School Professor at Cornell University.

== Life and career ==
Thorbecke was born into a prominent Dutch family. His great-grandfather Johan Rudolf Thorbecke virtually singlehandedly drafted the revision of the Constitution of the Netherlands and served as Prime Minister of the country on three occasions. His father Willem J. R. Thorbecke was a professor and served as an ambassador to China. His mother Madelaine Salisbury's great-grandfather Fernando Wood was a Mayor of New York City. He married Charla J. Westerberg in 1954 and was the father of three sons.

He spent his early years in Europe. He was a student at the International School of Geneva (1939–1947) and at the Netherlands School of Economics (now part of Erasmus University Rotterdam) (1948–51). He obtained his Ph.D. from the University of California, Berkeley in 1957.

Thorbecke was awarded an honorary doctorate by the Ghent University in 1981.

After teaching at Iowa State University from 1957 to 1973, Thorbecke moved to Ithaca and spent the rest of his professional career at Cornell University. He also served as economic adviser to the National Planning Institute, Lima, Peru (1963–64); associate assistant administrator for program policy USAID, Washington (1966–68); member of the USAID's Research Advisory Committee (1976–81); senior economist at the World Employment Program at the International Labor Office, Geneva, (1972–73); visiting professor, Erasmus University Rotterdam (1980–81); Member of Committee on International Nutritional Programs NRC-NAS (1979–81); Director, Program on Comparative Economic Development, Cornell U. (1988–2001), senior research fellow, Institute for Policy Reform (1990–97). At Cornell, he was affiliated with the departments of economics (which he chaired in 1974–78), agricultural economics, and nutritional sciences.

Thorbecke died on April 26, 2026, at the age of 97.

== Works ==
Thorbecke's academic contributions have been primarily in the field of development economics. He has authored or edited (often with collaborators) over 25 books and monographs and published over 200 technical articles in professional journals including the American Economic Review, American Journal of Agricultural Economics, Econometrica, Economic Development and Cultural Change, the Economic Journal, Journal of African Economies, Journal of Development Economics, Journal of Policy Modeling, and World Development.

=== Foster-Greer-Thorbecke Poverty Measure ===
In 1984, Thorbecke published a seminal article "A Class of Decomposable Poverty Measures" in Econometrica with his former student Joel Greer and another graduate student at Cornell at the time, James Foster. The Foster-Greer-Thorbecke (sometimes referred to as FGT) metric is a generalized measure of poverty within an economy. It combines information on the extent of poverty (as measured by the Headcount ratio, i.e., the proportion of poor in the population), the intensity of poverty (as measured by the Total Poverty Gap) and inequality among the poor (as measured by the Gini and the coefficient of variation for the poor). The entry "Foster-Greer-Thorbecke Index" by Yanan Chen in "The SAGE Encyclopedia of World Poverty" explains the working of the measure. The article is one of the most highly cited papers on poverty.

FGT measure is widely used. It has been adopted as the standard poverty measure by the World Bank and many UN agencies and is used extensively by researchers doing empirical work on poverty (the book "Multidimensional Poverty Measurement and Analysis" by Alkire et al. introduces the FGT measure, discusses extensions of the measure, and their applications) At one time the FGT measure (the squared poverty gap) was used to allocate inter-regionally funds from the Federal Government in Mexico for educational, health and nutritional programs benefitting the poor. In 2010 the Government of Mexico adopted a multidimensional poverty measure based on a variant of the FGT measure that is to be used in targeting the allocation of social funds to poor households at the municipality level.

=== Social Accounting Matrix ===
Following in the footsteps of Sir Richard Stone, Graham Pyatt and Erik Thorbecke played a significant role in the development and popularization of the Social Accounting Matrix (SAM). SAMs capture flows of all economic and financial transactions that take place within an economy (regional or national) among and between disaggregated production sectors, factors of production, institutions (including the government and socio-economic household groups) and the rest of the world.

== Conferences ==
A conference on "Poverty, Inequality, and Development: A Conference in Honor of Erik Thorbecke" was held at Cornell University in 2003. In 2013, a Symposium in his honor on "Growth, Poverty and Inequality: Confronting the Challenges of a Better Life for All of Africa" was organized by the Institute for African Development at Cornell University and the African Economic Research Consortium.

== Later activities ==
From the early 1990s, Thorbecke was closely associated with the African Economic Research Consortium, a "public not-for-profit organization devoted to the advancement of economic policy research and training." He served as the Chairman of the Thematic Research Group on "Poverty, Income Distribution and Food Security" and was a coordinator of a number of collaborative research projects.

In April 2015, Thorbecke was one of the four panelists in the symposium "Cornell and Global Poverty Reduction: Philanthropy, Policy, and Scholarship" as part of Cornell University's Sesquicentennial celebrations.
