= Foster–Greer–Thorbecke indices =

Family of poverty metrics

The Foster–Greer–Thorbecke indices are a family of poverty metrics. The most commonly used index from the family, FGT_{2}, puts higher weight on the poverty of the poorest individuals, making it a combined measure of poverty and income inequality and a popular choice within development economics. The indices were introduced in a 1984 paper by economists Erik Thorbecke, Joel Greer, and James Foster.

The individual indices within the family are derived by substituting different values of the parameter α into the following equation:

$FGT_\alpha=\frac {1} {N} \sum_{i=1}^H \left(\frac {z-y_i} {z}\right)^\alpha$

where z is the poverty threshold, N is the number of people in the economy, H is the number of poor (those with incomes at or below z), y_{i} is the income of each individual i. When α > 0, one can also render the FGT index using positive-part notation and summing over all units:

$FGT_\alpha=\frac {1} {N} \sum_{i=1}^N \left(\left[\frac {z-y_i} {z}\right]_+\right)^\alpha$

If $\alpha$ is low then the FGT metric weights all the individuals with incomes below z roughly the same. The higher the value of α, the greater the weight placed on the poorest individuals. The higher the FGT statistic, the more poverty there is in an economy.

== FGT_{0}and FGT_{1} ==
With α = 0, the formula reduces to the headcount ratio: the fraction of the population that lives below the poverty line.

$FGT_0=\frac {H} {N}$

With α = 1, the formula reduces to the poverty gap index.

$FGT_1=\frac {1} {N} \sum_{i=1}^H \left(\frac {z-y_i} {z}\right)$

The FGT_{1} can be rewritten as:

$FGT_1=\frac {H} {N} \left(\frac {z-\bar{y}_p} {z}\right)$ ,

where $\bar{y}_p=\sum_{i=1}^H\frac {y_i} {H}$ is the average income of the poor. Thus, the FGT_{1} can be expressed as the product of the FGT_{0} and the average income gap of the poor.

== FGT_{2} ==
While the two reduced indexes are widely used, the most common FGT-specific index in development economics is the α = 2 version, which is the lowest (whole) parameter to weigh income inequality along with poverty.

$FGT_2=\frac {1} {N} \sum_{i=1}^H \left(\frac {z-y_i} {z}\right)^2$

The FGT_{2} can be rewritten as:

$FGT_2=\frac {H} {N} [\mu^2 + (1-\mu^2) C_v^2]$

where C_{v} is the coefficient of variation among the incomes of the poor, H is the total number of the poor, and μ is given by:

$\mu=\frac {1} {H}\sum_{i=1}^H \left(\frac {z-y_i} {z}\right)$.

Other decompositions of the index are also possible. The only measure that combines FGT_{0}, FGT_{1}, and the Gini index is the Sen index.

In Mexico, this version of the index was used to allocate federal government funds between regions for educational, health, and nutritional programs benefiting the poor. In 2010, the Government of Mexico adopted a multidimensional poverty measure based on a variant of the FGT measure that is to be used in targeting the allocation of social funds to poor households at the municipality level.
