= James Foster (economist) =

American economist

James E. Foster
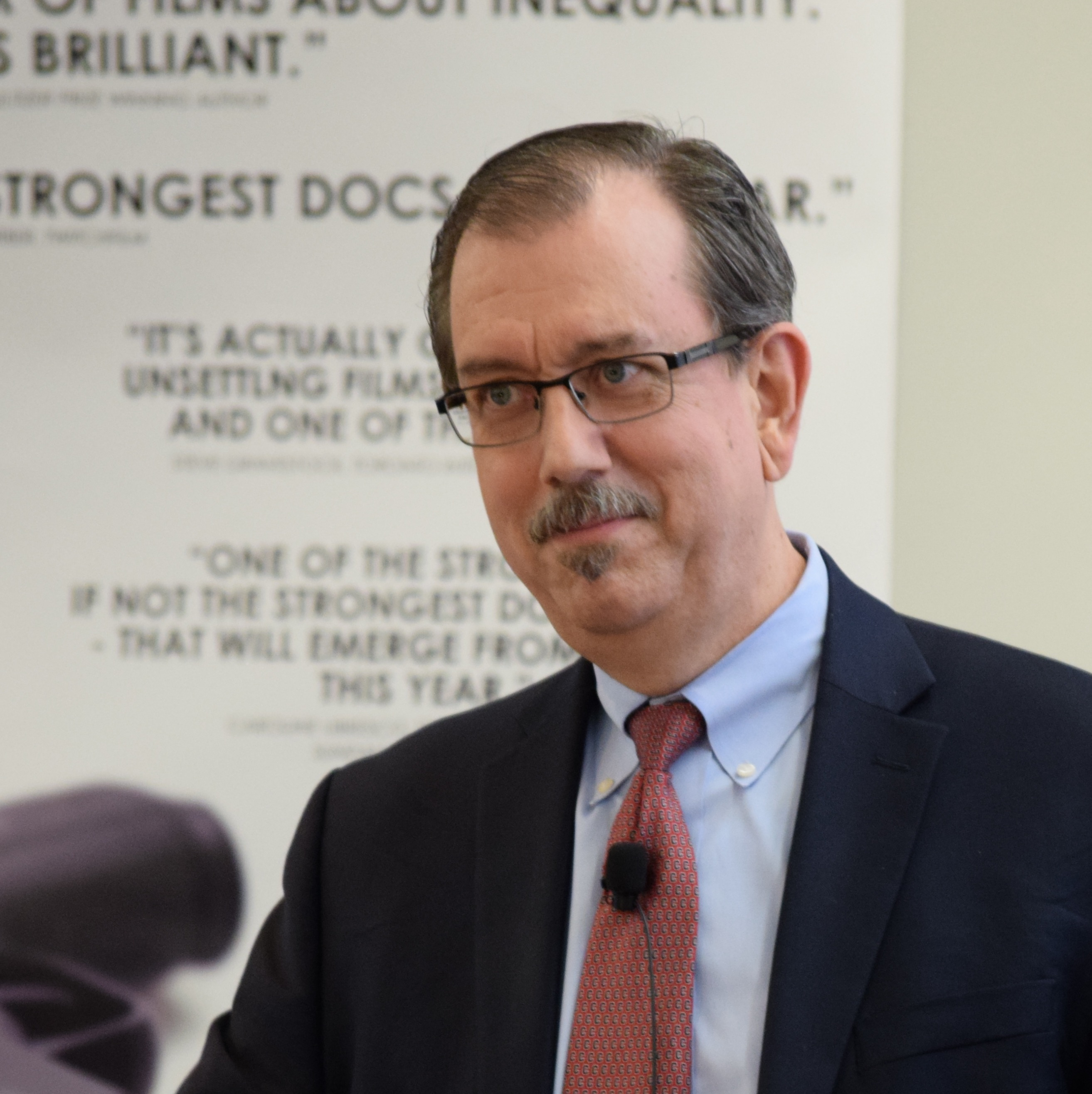
- Born: November 4, 1955 (age 70)
- Spouse: Irene Foster
- Children: Alisha Foster

Academic background
- Education: Cornell University

Academic work
- Discipline: Welfare economics, development economics, Measuring poverty
- Institutions: Elliott School of International Affairs
- Notable ideas: Multidimensional Poverty Index, Foster-Greer-Thorbecke indices
- Website: Information at IDEAS / RePEc

James Eric Foster (born November 4, 1955) is Professor of Economics and International Affairs at the George Washington University, in the Elliott School of International Affairs, researching welfare economics and poverty measurement. He is known for developing the Alkire Foster Method, with University of Oxford professor and OPHI Director Sabina Alkire. He is a board member for the World Bank.

== Career ==
He received his Ph.D. in Economics from Cornell University where he received the Selma Fine Goldsmith Award for his dissertation.

He has also taught at the Krannert School of Management at Purdue University, along with Vanderbilt University.

James Foster and Sabina Alkire developed the Alkire Foster Method for Multidimensional Poverty Measurement, a measurement that allows for a more holistic approach to identifying poverty globally, taking into account dimensions like health or education, in a departure from traditional income methods. Today, dozens of countries have adopted the method in their approach to poverty alleviation and the index is famously used in Bhutan's Gross National Happiness Index. In August 2015, multidimensional poverty was written into the United Nations Agenda for its Sustainable Development Goals, which was ratified in September of the same year.

His 1984 Econometrica paper, written jointly with Joel Greer and Erik Thorbecke, is one of the most highly cited papers on poverty. The paper established the Foster-Greer-Thornbecke Index, which has expanded into a family of poverty metrics. The paper was revisited in 2010 by Foster, Greer, and Thornbecke. Throughout his career, he also collaborated with Amartya Sen on economic inequality and Kaushik Basu on literacy.

Foster is also an affiliate faculty member of the Institute for International Economic Policy, previously serving as Director. He is additionally a Research Fellow at the Oxford Poverty and Human Development Initiative and an advisory board member of the World Bank Commission on Global Poverty. He has been a visiting professor at the London School of Economics, Cornell, Essex, Oxford, Harvard, and the University of the Americas in Puebla, Mexico. He received the Unilever Fellowship and the Robert Wood Johnson Investigator Award in Health Policy, and holds a Doctorate Honoris Causa from Universidad Autónoma del Estado de Hidalgo (Mexico).

James Foster is married to fellow economist Irene R. Foster. She also is a professor at the George Washington University.

== See also ==
- Alkire Foster Method
- Amartya Sen
- Multidimensional Poverty Index
- Foster–Greer–Thorbecke indices
