= Regional Input–Output Modeling System =

The Regional Input–Output Modeling System (RIMS II) is a regional economic model developed and maintained by the US Bureau of Economic Analysis (BEA).

Regional input–output multipliers such as the RIMS II multipliers allow estimates of how a one-time or sustained increase in economic activity in a particular region will impact other industries located in the region—i.e., estimating local shocks on gross output, value added, earnings, and employment. RIMS II multipliers differ from macro-economic multipliers, which are used to assess the effects of fiscal stimulus on gross national product. Differences in industry-specific regional multipliers are not meaningful, nor appropriate for use in a national context.

RIMS II allows for estimates at the regional level because the multipliers are based on BEA data at the national and regional level.

RIMS II multipliers have been used by both the public and private sectors. There are numerous examples of their use:

- Federal Government agencies have used the multipliers to study the local impact of government regulation on specific industries and to assess the local economic impacts of Federal actions such as military base closings.
- State and local governments have used the multipliers to estimate the regional economic impacts of government policies and projects and of events, such as firms locating within their state, or to assess the impacts of tourism.
- Businesses and private consultants have used the multipliers to estimate the economic impacts of a wide range of projects, such as building a new sports facility or expanding an airport; of natural disasters, such as Hurricane Katrina; or of special events, such as national political conventions.

RIMS II provides six types of multipliers: final-demand multipliers for output, earnings, employment, and value added; and direct-effect multipliers for earnings and employment.

== History ==
The BEA introduced the RIMS tool in the early 1970s; an enhancement of the framework was completed in the 1980s, introducing RIMS II, which is the current framework.

The RIMS II framework is updated every few years with new data, depending on the resources available to the BEA. For example, after 2012, the BEA stopped releasing new updates to the multipliers. In 2015, the BEA began re-releasing the multipliers; they are generally released on an annual basis.

== Data ==
The RIMS II framework currently encompasses multipliers for the "benchmark series". In past, the BEA also released an "annual series"; however, the annual series has been discontinued.

The RIMS II benchmark multiplier system is based on national benchmark input–output data combined with regional data. Often, the national dataset is a few years behind the regional dataset.

== Releases ==
This list currently does not go through all releases of the BEA RIMS II multipliers, but does list the last few and the associated datasets:

- 2016, December (most recent): 2007 national benchmark input–output data and 2015 regional data
- 2015, November: 2007 national benchmark input–output data and 2013 regional data
- 2012, October: 2002 national benchmark input–output data and 2010 regional data

== See also ==
- Input–output model
- Social accounting matrix
