= Poverty gap index =

Measurement of poverty intensity

The poverty gap index is a measure of the degree of poverty in a country. It is defined as "extent to which individuals on average fall below the poverty line, and expresses it as a percentage of the poverty line."

The poverty gap index is an improvement over the poverty measure head count ratio, which simply counts all the people below a poverty line in a given population and considers them equally poor. Poverty gap index estimates the depth of poverty by considering how far the poor are from that poverty line on average.

The poverty gap index sometimes referred to as 'poverty gap ratio' or 'pg index' is defined as an average of the ratio of the poverty gap to the poverty line. It is expressed as a percentage of the poverty line for a country or region.

== Significance ==
The most common method measuring and reporting poverty is the headcount ratio, given as the percentage of the population that is below the poverty line. For example, The New York Times in July 2012 reported the poverty headcount ratio as 11.1% of American population in 1973, 15.2% in 1983, and 11.3% in 2000. One of the undesirable features of the headcount ratio is that it ignores the depth of poverty; if the poor become poorer, the headcount index does not change.

Poverty gap index provides a clearer perspective on the depth of poverty. It enables poverty comparisons. It also helps provide an overall assessment of a region's progress in poverty reduction and the evaluation of specific public policies or private initiatives.

== Calculation ==
The poverty gap index (PGI) is calculated as,

$${\rm PGI} = \frac{1}{N} \sum_{j=1}^{q} \left( \frac{z-y_j}{z} \right)$$

or

$${\rm PGI} = \frac{1}{N} \sum_{j=1}^{N} \left( \frac{(z-y_j).1(y_j<z)}{z} \right)$$

where $N$ is the total population, $q$ is the total population of poor who are living at or below the poverty line, $z$ is the poverty line, and $y_j$ is the income of the poor individual $j$. In this calculation, individuals whose income is above the poverty line have a gap of zero.

By definition, the poverty gap index is a percentage between 0 and 100%. Sometimes it is reported as a fraction, between 0 and 1. A theoretical value of zero implies that no one in the population is below the poverty line. A theoretical value of 100% implies that everyone in the population has zero income. In some literature, poverty gap index is reported as $P_1$ while the headcount ratio is reported as $P_0$.

== Features ==
The poverty gap index can be interpreted as the average percentage shortfall in income for the population, from the poverty line.

If you multiply a country's poverty gap index by both the poverty line and the total number of individuals in the country you get the total amount of money needed to bring the poor in the population out of extreme poverty and up to the poverty line, assuming perfect targeting of transfers. For example, suppose a country has 10 million individuals, a poverty line of $500 per year, and a poverty gap index of 5%. Then an average increase of $25 per individual per year would eliminate extreme poverty. $25 is 5% of the poverty line. The total increase needed to eliminate poverty is US$250 million—$25 multiplied by 10 million individuals.

The poverty gap index is an important measure beyond the commonly used headcount ratio. Two regions may have a similar head count ratio, but distinctly different poverty gap indices. A higher poverty gap index means that poverty is more severe.

The poverty gap index is additive. In other words, the index can be used as an aggregate poverty measure, as well as decomposed for various sub-groups of the population, such as by region, employment sector, education level, gender, age, or ethnic group.

== Limitations ==
The poverty gap index ignores the effect of inequality between the poor. It does not capture differences in the severity of poverty amongst the poor. As a theoretical example, consider two small neighborhoods where just two households each are below the official poverty line of US$500 income per year. In one case, household 1 has an income of US$100 per year and household 2 has an income of US$300 per year. In second case, the two households both have annual income of US$200 per year. The poverty gap index for both cases is same (60%), even though the first case has one household, with US$100 per year income, experiencing a more severe state of poverty. Scholars, therefore, consider poverty gap index as a moderate but incomplete improvement over poverty head count ratio.

Scholars such as Amartya Sen suggest poverty gap index offers a quantitative improvement over simply counting the poor below the poverty line, but remains limited at the qualitative level. Focusing on precisely measuring income gap diverts the attention from qualitative aspects such as capabilities, skills and personal resources that may sustainably eradicate poverty. A better measure would focus on capabilities and consequent consumption side of impoverished households. These suggestions were initially controversial, and have over time inspired scholars to propose numerous refinements.

== Related measures ==
The Foster–Greer–Thorbecke metric is the general form of the PGI. The $FGT_\alpha$ formula raises the summands to the power alpha, so that FGT0 is the headcount index, FGT1 the PGI and FGT2 the squared PGI.

Squared poverty gap index, also known poverty severity index or $P_2$, is related to poverty gap index. It is calculated by averaging the square of the poverty gap ratio. By squaring each poverty gap data, the measure puts more weight the further a poor person's observed income falls below the poverty line. The squared poverty gap index is one form of a weighted sum of poverty gaps, with the weight proportionate to the poverty gap.

Sen index, sometimes referred to $P_{\text{SEN}}$, is related to poverty gap index (PGI). It is calculated as follows:

$${\rm P_{\text{SEN}}} = H*G_z + PGI*(1-G_z)$$

where, $H$ is the head count ratio and $G_z$ is the income Gini coefficient of only the people below the poverty line.

Watts index, sometimes referred to $W$, is related to poverty gap index (PGI). It is calculated as follows:

$${\rm W} = \frac{1}{N} \sum_{j=1}^{q} \ln \left( \frac{z}{y_j} \right)$$

The terms used to calculate $W$ are same as in poverty gap index (see the calculation section in this article).

== Poverty gap index by country ==
The following table summarizes the poverty gap index for developed and developing countries across the world.

Poverty gap ratio for various countries
Country	Poverty line ($/month) (Note: This is on purchasing power parity basis, international dollar adjusted for inflation to 2005; To convert to $ per day income, divide by 30.4; for annual income multiply by 12.)	Head count ratio (%)	Poverty gap index (%)	Year
Albania	52	22.9	14.18	2020
Angola	38	54.31	29.94	2000
Argentina (Note: This data is for urban population only.)	38	0.92	0.65	2010
Armenia	38	1.28	0.25	2008
Australia	959	12.4	2.93	2010
Austria	1024	6.6	1.81	2010
Azerbaijan	38	0.43	0.14	2008
Bangladesh	38	43.25	11.17	2010
Belarus	38	0.1	0.1	2008
Belgium	930	8.8	1.80	2010
Belize	38	12.21	5.52	1999
Benin	38	47.33	15.73	2003
Bhutan	38	10.22	1.81	2007
Bolivia	38	15.61	8.64	2008
Bosnia and Herzegovina	38	0.04	0.02	2007
Botswana	38	31.23	11.04	1993
Brazil	350	3.91	3.62	2015
Burkina Faso	38	44.6	14.66	2009
Burundi	38	81.32	36.39	2006
Cambodia	38	22.75	4.87	2008
Cameroon	38	9.56	1.2	2007
Canada	1056	12.1	2.96	2010
Cape Verde	38	21.02	6.05	2001
Central African Republic	38	62.83	31.26	2008
Chad	38	61.94	25.64	2002
Chile	38	1.35	0.69	2009
China (Note: This data is for rural population of China.)	38	16.25	4.03	2005
Colombia	38	8.16	3.78	2010
Comoros	38	46.11	20.82	2004
Costa Rica	38	3.12	1.79	2009
Cote d'Ivoire	38	23.75	7.5	2008
Czech Republic	515	5.8	1.37	2010
Denmark	955	5.3	1.29	2010
Djibouti	38	18.84	5.29	2002
Dominican Republic	38	2.24	0.52	2010
Congo, Dem. Rep.	38	87.72	52.8	2005
Congo, Rep.	38	54.1	22.8	2005
Ecuador	38	4.6	2.1	2010
Egypt	38	1.69	0.4	2008
Estonia	38	8.9	4.4	2009
Ethiopia	38	39	9.6	2005
Fiji	38	5.9	1.1	2009
Finland	875	7.3	1.48	2010
France	861	7.1	1.44	2010
Gabon	38	4.8	.9	2005
Gambia	38	33.6	11.7	2003
Germany	918	11	3.67	2010
Georgia	38	15.3	4.6	2008
Ghana	38	28.6	9.9	2006
Greece	720	12.6	3.36	2010
Guatemala	38	13.5	4.7	2006
Guinea	38	43.3	15.	2007
Guinea-Bissau	38	48.9	16.6	2002
Guyana	38	8.7	2.8	1998
Haiti	38	61.7	32.3	2001
Honduras	38	17.9	9.4	2009
Hungary	407	7.1	1.66	2010
Iceland	942	7.1	2.55	2010
Ireland	934	14.8	3.08	2010
India	38	32.7	7.5	2010
Indonesia	38	18.1	3.3	2010
Iran	38	1.45	0.34	2005
Iraq	38	2.8	0.42	2007
Italy	700	11.4	3.08	2010
Jamaica	38	0.21	0.02	2004
Japan	950	14.9	5.17	2010
Jordan	38	0.12	0.03	2010
Kazakhstan	38	0.11	0.03	2009
Kenya	38	43.4	16.9	2005
Kyrgyzstan	38	6.4	1.5	2008
Laos	38	44	12.1	2002
Latvia	38	0.14	0.1	2008
Lesotho	38	43.4	20.8	2003
Liberia	38	83.8	40.9	2007
Lithuania	38	0.16	0.1	2008
Luxembourg	1511	8.1	1.62	2010
Macedonia	38	0.29	0.04	2008
Madagascar	38	81.3	43.3	2010
Malawi	38	73.9	32.3	2004
Maldives	38	1.48	0.14	2008
Mali	38	50.4	16.4	2010
Mauritania	38	23.4	6.8	2008
Mexico	192	18.4	6.97	2010
Micronesia	38	31.2	16.3	2000
Moldova	38	0.39	0.08	2010
Montenegro	38	0.12	0.08	2008
Morocco	38	2.5	.54	2007
Mozambique	38	59.6	25.1	2008
Namibia	38	31.9	9.5	2004
Nepal	38	24.8	5.6	2010
Netherlands	1168	7.7	1.61	2010
New Zealand	803	10.8	3.63	2010
Nicaragua	38	11.9	2.4	2005
Niger	38	43.6	12.4	2008
Nigeria	38	68	33.7	2010
Norway	1109	6.8	2.00	2010
Pakistan	38	21	3.5	2008
Panama	38	6.6	2.1	2010
Papua	38	35.8	12.3	1996
Paraguay	38	7.2	3.	2010
Peru	38	4.9	1.3	2010
Philippines	38	18.4	3.7	2009
Poland	338	14.6	5.20	2010
Portugal	512	12.9	3.74	2010
Romania	38	0.41	0.19	2009
Russia	61	14.3	5.09	2006
Rwanda	38	63.2	26.6	2011
São Tomé and Príncipe	38	28.2	7.9	2001
Senegal	38	33.5	10.8	2005
Serbia	38	0.26	0.17	2009
Sierra Leone	38	53.4	20.3	2003
Slovakia	368	8.1	2.07	2010
South Africa	38	13.8	2.3	2009
South Korea	809	14.6	5.26	2010
Spain	749	14.1	4.51	2010
Sri Lanka	38	7	1	2007
Sudan	38	19.8	5.5	2009
Suriname	38	15.5	5.9	1999
Swaziland	38	40.6	16.	2010
Sweden	863	5.3	1.31	2010
Syria	38	1.71	0.2	2004
Switzerland	1148	8.7	3.37	2010
Tajikistan	38	6.6	1.2	2009
Tanzania	38	67.9	28.1	2007
Thailand	38	0.37	0.05	2009
East Timor	38	37.4	8.9	2007
Togo	38	38.7	11.4	2006
Trinidad and Tobago	38	4.2	1.1	2008
Tunisia	38	1.35	0.28	2005
Turkey	211	17.5	5.76	2010
Turkmenistan	38	24.8	7	1998
Uganda	38	38.01	12.2	2009
Ukraine	38	0.06	0.04	2009
United Kingdom	1027	8.3	2.06	2010
United States (Note: The U.S. defines its poverty line on a dynamic basis and household size. As an example, for a family of 4 in a household, the poverty line was about $1,838 per month.)	1232	17.1	6.55	2010
Uruguay	38	0.2	0.07	2008
Venezuela	38	6.6	3.7	2006
Vietnam	38	16.9	3.8	2008
Yemen	38	17.5	4.2	2005
Zambia	38	68.5	37	2006

== See also ==
- Foster–Greer–Thorbecke indices
- Gini coefficient
- Multidimensional Poverty Index
- Human Poverty Index
- Human Development Index
- Gender Development Index
- Gender Empowerment Measure
- Education Index
