= Multidimensional Poverty Index =

Range of poverty indicators

Multidimensional Poverty Indices use a range of indicators (monetary, health, education and others) to calculate a summary poverty figure for a given population, in which a larger figure indicates a higher level of poverty. This figure considers both the proportion of the population that is deemed poor and the 'breadth' of poverty experienced by these 'poor' households, following the Alkire & Foster 'counting method'. The method was developed following increased criticism of monetary and consumption-based poverty measures, seeking to capture the deprivations in non-monetary factors that contribute towards well-being. While there is a standard set of indicators, dimensions, cutoffs and thresholds used for a 'Global MPI', the method is flexible and there are many examples of poverty studies that modify it to best suit their environment. The methodology has been mainly, but not exclusively, applied to developing countries.

The Global Multidimensional Poverty Index (MPI) was developed in 2010 by the Oxford Poverty & Human Development Initiative (OPHI) and the United Nations Development Programme and uses health, education and standard of living indicators to determine the incidence and intensity of poverty experienced by a population. It has since been used to measure acute poverty across over 100 developing countries. The Global MPI is released annually by UNDP and OPHI and the results are published on their websites. The MPI is published along with the Human Development Index (HDI) in the Human Development Report. It replaced the Human Poverty Index.

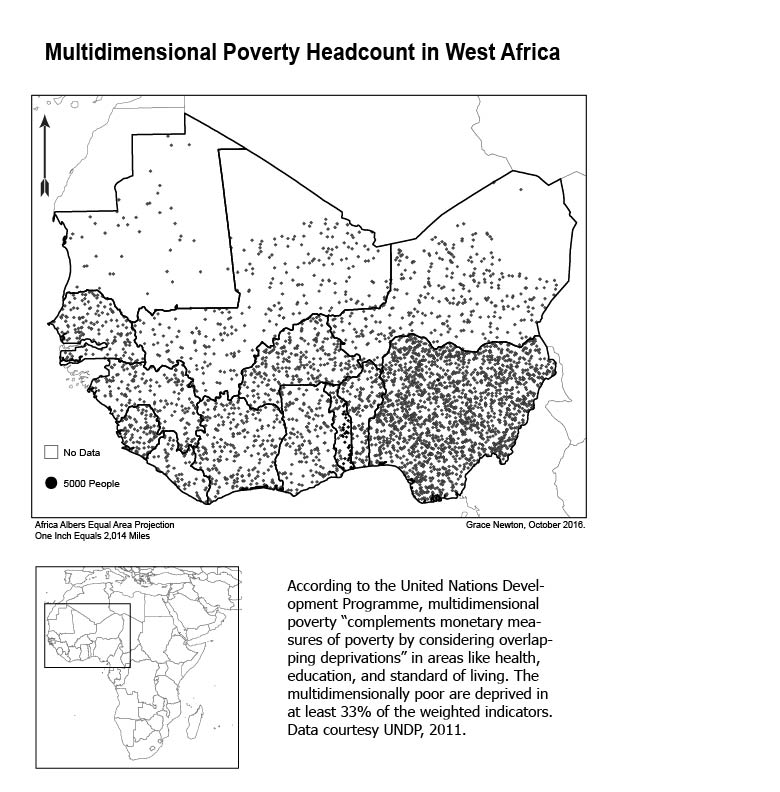
MPI Headcount in West Africa

Multidimensional Poverty Indices typically use the household as their unit of analysis, though this is not an absolute requirement. A household is deprived for a given indicator if they fail to satisfy a given 'cutoff' (e.g. having at least one adult member with at least six years of education). A household is assigned a 'deprivation score' determined by the number of indicators they are deprived in and the 'weights' assigned to those indicators. Each dimension (health, education, standard of living, etc.) is typically given an equal weighting, and each indicator within the dimension is also typically weighted equally. If this household deprivation score exceeds a given threshold (e.g. 1/3) then a household is considered to be 'multiply deprived', or simply 'poor'. The final 'MPI score' (or 'Adjusted Headcount Ratio') is determined by the proportion of households deemed 'poor', multiplied by the average deprivation score of 'poor' households.

MPI advocates state that the method can be used to create a comprehensive picture of people living in poverty, and permits comparisons both across countries, regions and the world and within countries by ethnic group, urban/rural location, as well as other key household and community characteristics. MPIs are useful as an analytical tool to identify the most vulnerable people – the poorest among the poor, revealing poverty patterns within countries and over time, enabling policymakers to target resources and design policies more effectively. Critics of this methodology have pointed out that changes to cutoffs and thresholds, as well as the indicators included and weightings attributed to them can change MPI scores and the resulting poverty evaluation.

== Dimensions and indicators ==
=== Dimensions ===
The Global MPI uses three standard dimensions: Health; Education; Standard of Living and ten indicators. These mirror the Human Development Index (HDI).

Multidimensional Poverty Indices used for purposes other than global comparison have sometimes used different dimensions, including income and consumption.

=== Indicators and cutoffs ===
The Global MPI uses the following ten indicators with the following cutoffs.

Dimension	Indicators	Deprivation Cutoffs
Health	Child mortality	Deprived if a child under the age of 18 years has died in the family in the five years preceding the survey.
Health	Nutrition	Deprived if any adult or child, for whom there is nutritional information, is undernourished.
Education	Years of schooling	Deprived if no household member has completed six years of schooling.
Education	School attendance	No household member aged 'school entrance age + six' years or older has completed six years of schooling.
Standard of living	Cooking fuel	Deprived if the household cooks with dung, wood or charcoal.
Standard of living	Sanitation	Deprived if the household's sanitation facility is either not improved (according to MDG guidelines), is shared with other households, or both.
Standard of living	Drinking water	Deprived if the household does not have access to improved drinking water (according to MDG guidelines) or improved drinking water is more than a 30-minute walk from the home round trip.
Standard of living	Electricity	Deprived if the household has no electricity.
Standard of living	Housing	Deprived if at least one of the three housing materials for roof, walls and floor are inadequate: the floor is of natural materials and/or the roof and/or walls are of natural or rudimentary materials.
Standard of living	Assets	Deprived if the household does not own more than one of these assets: radio, TV, telephone, computer, animal cart, bicycle, motorbike or refrigerator and does not own a car or truck.

The indicators selected for other MPI-oriented studies vary according to the availability of data and the context, as well as the theoretical considerations of the researchers.

== Calculation ==
=== The Alkire-Foster 'counting method' ===
The Alkire-Foster (AF) method is a way of measuring multidimensional poverty developed by OPHI's Sabina Alkire and James Foster. Building on the Foster-Greer-Thorbecke poverty measures, it involves counting the different types of deprivation that individuals experience at the same time, such as a lack of education or employment, or poor health or living standards. These deprivation profiles are analysed to identify who is poor and then used to construct a multidimensional index of poverty (MPI).

==== Constructing poverty measures ====
The most common way of measuring poverty is to calculate the percentage of the population who are poor, known as the headcount ratio (H). Having identified who is poor, the AF methodology generates a unique class of poverty measures (Mα) that goes beyond the simple headcount ratio. Three measures in this class are of high importance:

- Adjusted headcount ratio (M0), otherwise known as the MPI: This measure reflects both the incidence of poverty (the percentage of the population who are poor) and the intensity of poverty (the percentage of deprivations suffered by each person or household on average). M0 is calculated by multiplying the incidence (H) by the intensity (A). M0 = H x A.
- Adjusted Poverty Gap (M1): This measure reflects the incidence, intensity and depth of poverty. The depth of poverty is the average 'gap' (G) between the level of deprivation poor people experience and the poverty cut-off line. M1 = H x A x G.
- Adjusted Squared Poverty Gap (M2): This measure reflects the incidence, intensity, and depth of poverty, as well as inequality among the poor (captured by the squared gap, S). M2 = H x A x S.

M0 can be calculated with ordinal as well as cardinal data, which is why it is most often used. Cardinal data are required to calculate M1 and M2.

The AF Method is unique in that by measuring intensity it can distinguish between, for example, a group of poor people who suffer two deprivations on average and a group of poor people who suffer five deprivations on average at the same time.

=== Fictional example ===
Country X consists of persons A, B and C. The following table shows the deprivation on each of the 10 indicators for persons A, B and C.

"0%" indicates no deprivation in that indicator, while "100%" indicates deprivation in that indicator.

Indicator	Weight	Person A	Person B	Person C
1	1/6	0%	0%	0%
2	1/6	0%	0%	0%
3	1/6	100%	100%	0%
4	1/6	0%	100%	0%
5	1/18	0%	100%	100%
6	1/18	0%	100%	100%
7	1/18	0%	0%	100%
8	1/18	100%	100%	100%
9	1/18	100%	0%	100%
10	1/18	100%	0%	0%
Weighted score		33.33%	50.00%	27.78%
Status		MPI poor (≥ 33%)	MPI poor (≥ 33%)	Not MPI poor (< 33%)

Factor H for country X is:

$\frac {1 + 1 + 0}{3} = 0.667$

Factor A for country X is:

$\frac {33.33\% + 50.00\%} {2} = 0.417$

Thus, the MPI for country X is:

$0.667 \times 0.417 = 0.278$

== Comparisons with other indicators ==
=== Comparison with HDI ===
The Human Development Index (HDI) was developed by Mahbub ul Haq and Amartya Sen in 1990, and was also developed by the UNDP. It is calculated as the geometric mean of the normalized indices of the three dimensions of human development; it takes into account: health, education and standard of living. UNDP has a separate version of the HDI named the IHDI (Inequality-adjusted HDI).

While both the HDI and the MPI use the three broad dimensions health, education and standard of living, the HDI uses indicators at the aggregate level while the MPI uses microdata and all indicators must come from the same survey. This, among other reasons, has led to the MPI only being calculated for just over 100 countries, where data is available for all these diverse indicators, while HDI is calculated for almost all countries.

However, though HDI is thus more universally applicable, its relative sparsity of indicators also makes it more susceptible to bias. Indeed, some studies have found it to be somewhat biased towards GDP per capita (GDPpc), as demonstrated by a high correlation between HDI and the log of GDPpc. Hence, HDI has been criticized for ignoring other development parameters.

=== Comparison with other indicators ===
Both the HDI and the MPI have been criticized by economists such as Ratan Lal Basu for not taking the "moral/emotional/spiritual dimensions" of poverty into consideration. It has been attempted to capture these additional factors in the "Global Happiness Index".

== Impact of COVID-19 ==
According to reports, the COVID-19 pandemic impacted education, employment and social protection of people in countries which have higher levels of multidimensional poverty such as Zambia. Risks of school nonattendance are informed by UNESCO data on daily school closures around the world. We derive a risk of 50% for children in school age to experience significant loss of schooling, and thus deprivation in school attendance due to school closures during the first year of the pandemic.

== See also ==
- World Happiness Report

== Bibliography ==
- Duncan Green (2014), Are we measuring the right things? The latest multidimensional poverty index is launched today, Oxfam, archived from the original on June 24, 2014
- David Satterthwaite (2014), Multidimensional Poverty Index: Another underestimate of urban poverty, London: International Institute for Environment and Development
- Multi-Dimensional Poverty Index: An Application to the United States (PDF), University of Wisconsin-Madison, Institute for Research on Poverty, 2015
