= Head count ratio =

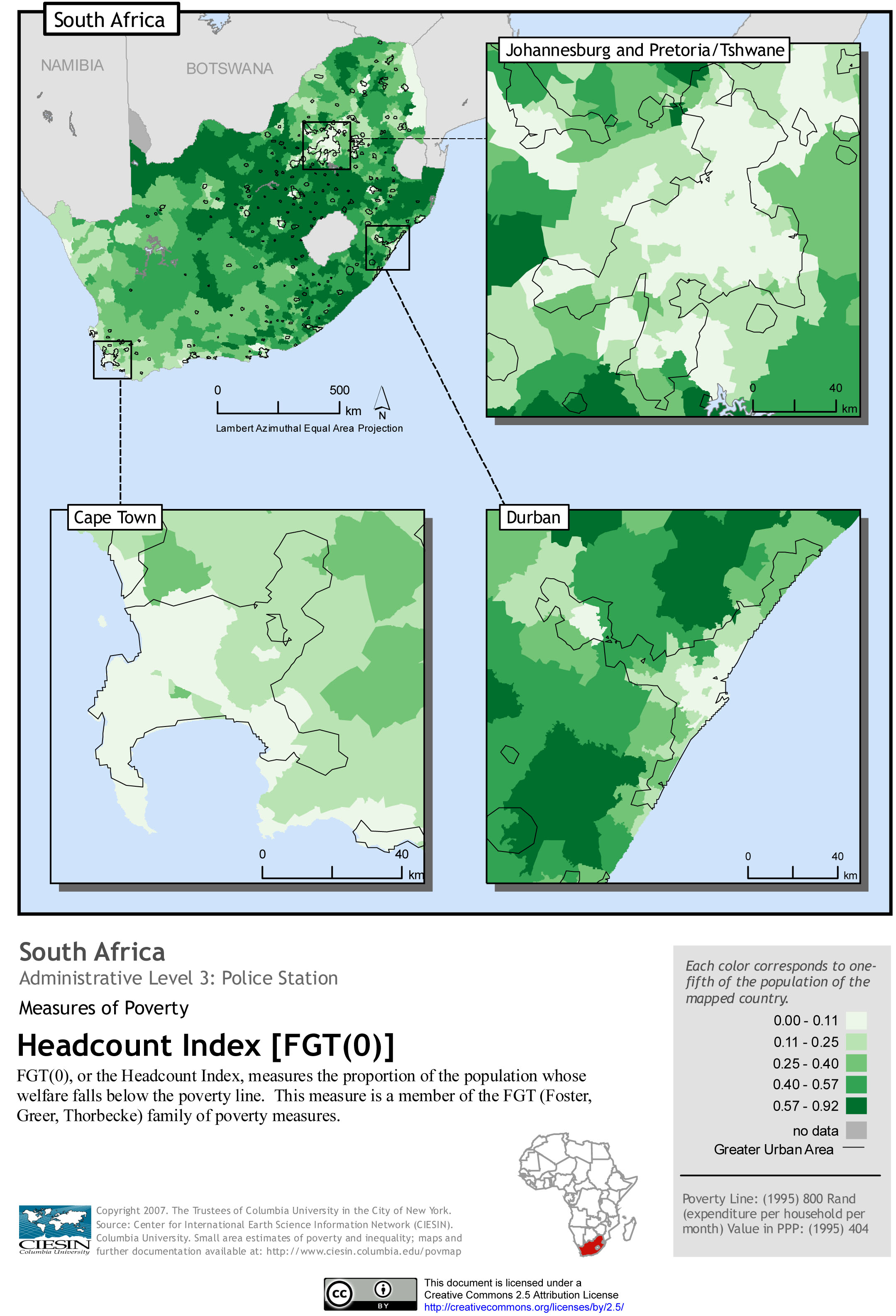
Head count ratio in South Africa

The head count ratio (HCR) is the population proportion that exists, or lives, below the poverty threshold. One of the undesirable features of the head count ratio is that it ignores the depth of poverty; if the poor become poorer, the head count index does not change. For example, the poverty head count ratio at national poverty line (percentage of population) in India was last reported at 21.9% in 2011. In July 2012, The New York Times reported the poverty head count ratio as 11.1% of the population of the United States in 1973, 15.2% in 1983 and 11.3% in 2000.

== See also ==
- Poverty gap index
