= Institute for International Economic Policy =

Research institution

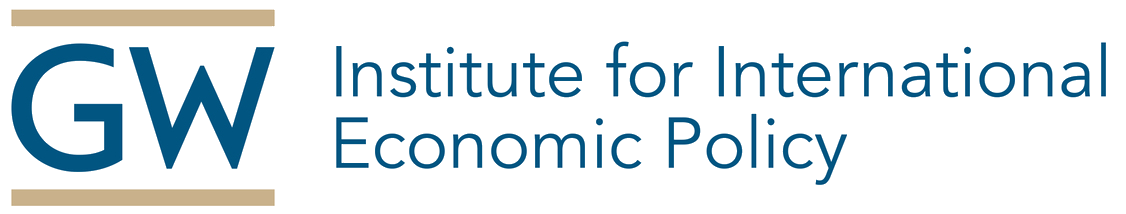
- Established: 2007; 19 years ago
- Mission: To serve as a catalyst for high quality, multidisciplinary, and non-partisan research on global economic policy issues.
- Director: Maggie Chen
- Location: Washington, D.C. United States
- Coordinates: 38.8961°N 77.0447°W
- Interactive map of Institute for International; Economic Policy
- Website: Official website

The Institute for International Economic Policy (abbreviated as IIEP) is a research institution dedicated to the study of global economic governance, based in Washington, DC at the Elliott School of International Affairs of the George Washington University. Notable IIEP members include Sabina Alkire, James Foster, and Jeni Klugman. Partnerships with organizations like the World Bank Group, International Monetary Fund, Internet Society, and The Nature Conservancy have led to academic conferences and policy seminars.

== History ==
IIEP was chartered by the George Washington University in July 2007. Its current director is Maggie X. Chen. Former directors include Jay Shambaugh, formerly a member of President Barack Obama's White House Council of Economic Advisers; James Foster, co-creator of the Alkire-Foster method to measure multidimensional poverty; Stephen C. Smith; and founding director Michael O. Moore.

== Research ==
The Institute's mission is formally to serve "as a catalyst for high quality, multidisciplinary, and non-partisan research on policy issues surrounding economic globalization" Affiliated faculty have appointments in the departments of economics, history, geography, and political science as well as the law, public health, political management, and business schools of George Washington University.

IIEP produces research and policy analyses in areas of global economic governance, such as ultra-poverty, climate change adaptation, international trade, and US-China relations. It is also the home of an International Trade and Investment Policy master's program.

IIEP serves as the institutional home of the Elliott School's International Trade and Investment Policy (ITIP) program. It also supports the Elliott School's certificate program in International Economic Policy. IIEP works in close collaboration with other George Washington University research centers (such as the Center for International Business Education and Research) and academic departments (see references below).

Publications by the IIEP include economic working papers, blog posts on development and finance topics, and an International Economics Study Center.

IIEP faculty members are also actively involved in the Ph.D. programs in disciplinary departments (such as economics, political science, and history) as well as professional programs in other GW schools (including the Law School and Business School).

=== Alkire-Foster Method of Poverty Measurement ===
Sabina Alkire and James Foster created a new method for measuring multidimensional poverty. It includes identifying 'who is poor' by considering the range of deprivations they suffer, and aggregating that information to reflect societal poverty in a way that is robust and decomposable.

Contemporary methods of measuring poverty and wellbeing commonly generate a statistic for the percentage of the population who are poor, a head count (H). The Alkire Foster Method generates a headcount and also a unique class of poverty measures (Mα):

M0: An 'adjusted head count'. This reflects both the incidence (the percentage of the population who are poor) and intensity of poverty (the number of deprivations suffered by each household, A). It is calculated by multiplying the proportion of people who are poor by the percentage of dimensions in which they are deprived (M0 = H x A).

M1: This measure reflects the incidence, intensity and depth of poverty. The depth of poverty is the 'gap' (G) between poverty and the poverty line (M1 = H x A x G).

M2: This measures reflects the incidence, intensity, depth of poverty and inequality among the poor (the squared gap, S) (M2 = H x A x S).

M0 can be calculated with ordinal and cardinal data. Cardinal data are required to calculate M1 and M2.

The Alkire Foster Method is unique in that it can distinguish between, for example, a group of poor people who suffer only one deprivation on average and a group of poor people who suffer three deprivations on average at the same time.

This flexible approach can be employed in a variety of situations by choosing different dimensions (e.g. education), indicators (e.g. how many years of education a person has) and cutoffs (e.g. a person with fewer than five years of education is considered deprived).

Common Uses of the Alkire Foster Method

- Poverty measures. The Alkire Foster method can be used to create national, regional or international measures of poverty or wellbeing by incorporating dimensions and indicators that are tailored to the specific context.
- Targeting of services or conditional cash transfers. The Alkire Foster method can be used to target people who meet multiple criteria.
- Monitoring and evaluation. The Alkire Foster method can be used to monitor the effectiveness of programs over time.
