= Brann =

Brann can refer to:

== People ==
Surname

- Anthony Brann (born 1970), Australian rugby league player
- Chris Brann (born 1972), American electronic music producer and remixer
- Conrad Brann (1925–2014), German-British linguist
- Donald Weldon Brann (1895–1945) American Major General
- Erik Brann (1950–2003), American guitarist, best known as a member of Iron Butterfly
- Esther Brann (1899–1998), American writer and illustrator
- Eva Brann (1929–2024), American educator; 2005 recipient of the National Humanities Medal
- George Brann (1865–1954), English cricketer and footballer
- John Brann (1892–1945), South African cricketer
- Louis J. Brann (1876–1948), American politician
- Louise Brann (1906–1982), American painter
- Matt Brann (born 1980), Canadian drummer, best known for his work with Avril Lavigne
- Matthew W. Brann (born 1965), American judge in Pennsylvania
- Ross Brann, American religious historian
- Tommy Brann (born 1951), American politician
- William Brann (cricketer) (1899–1953), South African cricketer
- William Cowper Brann (1855–1898), American journalist known as Brann the Iconoclast
- William L. Brann (c. 1877–1951), American businessman

Given name

- Brann Dailor (born 1975), American drummer, best known as a member of Mastodon

== Other ==
- Brann, several ships of the Royal Norwegian Navy
- Brann Boardinghouse, a historic place in Tonopah, Nevada, US
- Brann Department Stores, Swiss department store chain
- Brann Stadion, a football stadium in Bergen, Norway
- EHS Brann, now Havas Creative, a French advertising agency
- Governor Brann School, a historic school building on US Route 1
- SK Brann, a Norwegian association football club
- SK Brann (women), a Norwegian women's football club

== See also ==
- Branns Hamlet, a village in Antigua, Antigua and Barbuda
- Braun (disambiguation)
