= Larson House =

Larson House may refer to:

- Swan Larson Three-Decker, a house in Worcester, Massachusetts, listed on the U.S. National Register of Historic Places (NRHP)
- Dr. Albert M. and Evelyn M. Brandt House, Bismarck, North Dakota, also known as the Francis and Leona Larson House, NRHP-listed
- August Cornelius Larson House, Madison, Wisconsin, listed on the NRHP
