= Brande (disambiguation) =

Brande is a railway town in Jutland, Denmark

Brande may also refer to:

== Places ==
- Brande-Hörnerkirchen, municipality in Schleswig-Holstein, Germany.
- Ikast-Brande Municipality, in Region Midtjylland, Denmark
- Brande House, historic house in Reading, Massachusetts

== People ==
=== Given name ===
- Brande Roderick (born 1974), American model and actress

=== Surname ===
- Dorothea Brande (1893–1948), American writer and editor
- James Brande (fl. 1553–1563), English politician
- William Thomas Brande (1788–1866), English chemist

== Characters ==
- R. J. Brande, fictional DC Comics character

== See also ==
- Van den Brande, people bearing that surname
- Branle, also called Brande
- Brand (disambiguation)
