= William Brandt (disambiguation) =

Bill Brandt (1904–1983) was a German-British photographer and photojournalist.

William Brandt may also refer to:

- William Brandt (Nebraska politician) (1924–2000), American politician from Nebraska
- Bill Brandt (baseball) (1915–1968), American baseball pitcher
- William Niel Brandt (born 1970), American professor of astronomy and astrophysics
- Willy Brandt (1913–1992), German politician and chancellor from 1969 to 1974
- Willy Brandt (Oz), TV series character from HBO drama Oz
- Willie Brandt (activist), the founder of the Revolutionary Army, a violent United States political activist group in the 1970s
- William Brandt, fictional character in Mission: Impossible – Ghost Protocol and sequel Mission: Impossible – Rogue Nation

== See also ==
- Bill Brand (disambiguation)
- Brandt (disambiguation)
