= Brand (disambiguation) =

A brand is anything that is used to identify and distinguish a specific product, service or business.

Brand may also refer to:

== Places ==
- Brand (Aachen), a district of Aachen, Germany
- Brand, Netherlands, a hamlet in the municipality of Nuth, the Netherlands
- Brand (Saxon Switzerland), a mountain in Germany
- Brand, Bavaria, a municipality in Bavaria, Germany
- Brand, Vorarlberg, a municipality in Austria
- Division of Brand, an Australian electoral division
- Polana, Lower Silesian Voivodeship, a village in south-western Poland, formerly Prussia (German name Brand)

== Names ==
- Brand Blanshard (1892–1987), American philosopher
- Brand Whitlock (1869–1934), American politician
- Brand (surname)
- Brands (surname)

== Arts and entertainment ==
- Brand (play), an 1865 play by Henrik Ibsen, also the name of the protagonist
- A Brand, a Belgian rock band
- Brand (literary magazine), a 2007–2012 British periodical
- Brand (Rivan Warder), from The Belgariad
- the title character of Bill Brand, a 1976 British TV drama series
- Brand, a character from the Chronicles of Amber universe

== Other uses ==
- HNoMS Brand, several Norwegian warships
- Brand Brewery, a Dutch brewery owned by Heineken
- Brand (magazine), an anarchist magazine published since 1898
- Brand's, a British health supplement manufacturer now owned by Cerebos Pacific
- The Brand, another name for the Aryan Brotherhood
- Brand, the standardized botanical abbreviation for August Brand (1863–1930)

== See also ==
- Branding (disambiguation)
- Brandt (disambiguation)
- Brant (disambiguation)
