= Mark Anthony Neal =

American author and academic

- Born: December 2, 1965; The Bronx, New York, US
- Occupations: Academic and author
- Title: James B. Duke distinguised professor of African and African American Studies

Academic background
- Education: State University of New York at Fredonia, B.A. 1987 and M.A. 1993; State University of New York, Buffalo, Ph.D. 1996
- Thesis: Discursive Soul: Black Popular Music, Communal Critique, and The Black Public Sphere of the Urban North (1996)

Academic work
- Discipline: English and American Studies
- Sub-discipline: African American Studies
- Institutions: Duke University; State University of New York at Albany
- Website: scholars.duke.edu/person/man9

Mark Anthony Neal is an American academic and author. He is the department chair and professor of African and African American Studies at Duke University. In 2023, his book, Black Ephemera, won the PROSE Award from the Association of American Publishers. Neal is also a commentator with NPR and ESPN.

== Early life ==
Neal was born in the Bronx, New York on December 2, 1965. His parents were Elsie Robinson and Arthur C. Neal Jr. He grew up in the Throggs Neck projects of The Bronx. He attended Brooklyn Technical High School. He had a short career in music as MC Tony T.

Neal attended the State University of New York at Fredonia, earning a B.A. in English in 1987 and a M.A. in English 1993. While there, he was a member of Phi Beta Sigma. He then earned a Ph.D. in American studies at the State University of New York, Buffalo in 1996. His dissertation was Discursive Soul: Black Popular Music, Communal Critique, and The Black Public Sphere of the Urban North.

== Career ==
In 1995, Neal was a visiting scholar and graduate fellow at the University of Pittsburgh at Bradford. He became an assistant professor in American studies at Xavier University of Louisiana in 1996. He became an assistant, later associate, professor at the State University of New York at Albany, teaching English and Africana studies from 1997 to 2003. He then was an associate professor American studies at the University of Texas at Austin in 2003.

Neal became an associate professor of African studies and African American Studies at Duke University in 2004. In addition, he became a professor of English in 2016. He was promoted to the James B. Duke distinguished professor of African and African American Studies in 2018. He teaches classes in Black masculinity, popular culture, digital humanities, African-American literature, and the history of hip-hop. He has been the founding director of Duke's Center for the Arts, Digital Culture and Entrepreneurship since 2014 and chair of the Department of African and African American Studies since 2017.

Neal is the founder and managing editor of the NewBlackMan blog. He created the Left of Black web series in collaboration with the John Hope Franklin Center for Interdisciplinary and International Studies and Duke University. Neal has been an contributor to several media outlets, including the HuffPost Black Voices, C-SPAN, Inquest, NPR News and Notes with Farai Chideya, PopMatters, SeeingBlack, The Undefeated on ESPN, and Vibe.

== Honors ==
The State University of New York recognized Neal with its Distinguished Alumni Award in 1997. In 2010, Neal received the Robert B. Cox Teaching Award from Duke University. In 2012, World, Beats & Life presented Neal with the Hip-Hop Scholar of the Year Award. In 2015, the Minority Scholars Committee of the American Studies Association gave Neal the Richard A. Yarborough Award. In 2023, his book, Black Ephemera, won the PROSE Award in the music and performing arts category from the Association of American Publishers.

== Selected publications ==
=== Author, books ===
- What the Music Said: Black Popular Music and Black Public Culture. New York: Routledge, 1999. ISBN 9780415920728.
- Soul Babies: Black Popular Culture and the Post-Soul Aesthetic. New York: Routledge, 2002. ISBN 9780203950623.
- Songs in the Key of Black Life: A Rhythm and Blues Nation. Milton Park: Taylor & Francis, 2003. ISBN 9780415965712
- New Black Man. New York: Routledge, 2005. ISBN 9780415971096.
- Looking for Leroy: Illegible Black Masculinities. New York: New York University Press, 2013. ISBN 9780814758366.
- What the Music Said: Black Popular Music and Black Public Culture. New York: Routledge, 2013. ISBN 9780415920728.
- Black Ephemera: The Crisis and Challenge of the Musical Archive. New York: New York University Press, 2022. ISBN 9781479806881

=== Author, chapters ===
- "The Tortured Soul of Marvin Gaye and R. Kelly" in Da Capo Best Music Writing 2004: The Year's Finest Writing on Rock, Hip-hop, Jazz, Pop, Country, & More, edited by Mickey Hart. Boston: Da Capo Press, 2004. ISBN 978-0306813801.
- "A Way Out of No Way: Jazz, Hip Hop and Black Social Improvisation" in The Other Side of Nowhere: Jazz, Improvisation, and Communities in Dialogue, edited by Ajay Heble and Daniel Fischlin. Middletown: Wesleyan University Press, 2004. ISBN 9780819566829.
- "White Chocolate: Teena Marie and Lewis Taylor." in Listen Again: A Momentary History of Pop Music, edited by Eric Weisbard. Durham: Duke University Press, 2007. pp. 256–271l ISBN 978-0-8223-4022-5.
- "Sly Stone and the Sanctified Church" in The Funk Era and Beyond: New Perspectives on Black Popular Culture, edited by Tony Bolden. London: Palgrave Macmillan, 2008. ISBN 978-0312296087.
- "Music: Bodies in Pain" in Best African American Essays: 2009, edited by Gerald Early and Debra J. Dickerson. New York: Bantam Books, 2009. ISBN 978-0553806915.
- "Memory Lane: On Jazz, Hip-Hop and Fathers" in Born to Use Mics: Reading Nas’ Illmatic, edited by Michael Eric Dyson and Sohail Daulatzai. New York: Basic Civitas, 2009. ISBN 978-0-465-00211-5.
- "The Birth of New Blackness: The Family Stand’s Moon in Scorpio" in Rip It Up: The Black Experience in Rock N’ Roll, edited by Kadia Crazy Horse. London: Palgrave Macmillan, 2004. ISBN 978-1403962430.
- "The Chitlin' Circuit" in Ain’t Nothing Like the Real Thing: How the Apollo Theater Shaped American Culture, edited by Richard Carlin and Kinshasha Holman Conwill. Washington, D.C.: Smithsonian Books, 2010. ISBN 978-1588342690.
- “Hip-Hop Culture” in Ain’t Nothing Like the Real Thing: How the Apollo Theater Shaped American Culture, edited by Richard Carlin and Kinshasha Holman Conwill. Washington, D.C.: Smithsonian Books, 2010. ISBN 978-1588342690.
- "What Would Shirley Chisholm Say" in Who Should Be First? Feminist Speak Out on the 2008 Presidential Campaign. edited by Beverley Guy-Sheftall and Johnnetta Betsch Cole. Albany: SUNY Press, 2010. ISBN 9781438433752.
- "Thinking While Black" in Making the University Matter, edited by Barbie Zelizer. New York: Routledge, 2011. ISBN 9780415782401.
- "Now I Ain't Saying He's a 'Crate Digger': Kanye West and the Soul Archive" in The Cultural Impact of Kanye West, edited by Julius Bailey. London: Palgrave MacMillan, 2014. p. 3-12. ISBN 978-1-137-39581-8.
- "Underground to Harlem: Rumblings and Clickety-Clacks of Diaspora" in Escape from New York: The New Negro Renaissance Beyond Harlem, edited by Davarian L. Baldwin and Minkah Makalani. Minneapolis: University of Minnesota Press, 2013. ISBN 9780816677399.

=== Author, articles ===
- "White Chocolate: Teena Marie and Lewis Taylor", Popular Music, vol. 24, no. 3 (October, 2005), pp. 369–380. doi:10.1017/S0261143005000577.
- "A Nigger Un-Reconstructed: The Legacy of Richard Pryor". PopMatters (December 15, 2005).
- "(White) Male Privilege, Black Respectability, and Black Women’s Bodies". PopMatters (April 15, 2006).
- "Carrying the Water: On Michael Eric Dyson". PopMatters (July 22, 2007).
- "The Demise of Vibe Magazine and the Future of Criticism". PopMatters (July 23, 2009).
- "A Man Without a Country: The Boundaries of Legibility, Social Capital, and Cosmopolitan Masculinity". Criticism, vol. 52, no. 3-4 (Summer/Fall 2010), pp. 399–411. doi:10.1353/crt.2010.0045.
- "Pop Music and the Spatialization of Race in the 1990s". History Now: The Journal, vol. 32 (Summer 2012).
- "Finding Tea Cake: An Imagined Black Feminist Manhood". Palimpsest, vol. 1, no. 2 (2012), pp. 256–263. doi:10.1353/pal.2012.0023
- "Nigga: The 21st-Century Theoretical Superhero". Cultural Anthropology, vol. 28, no. 3 (August 2013), pp. 556–563. doi:10.1111/cuan.12025.
- "Trafficking in Monikers: Jay-Z’s 'Queer' Flow". Palimpsest, vol. 2, no. 2 (2013), pp. 156–161. doi:10.1353/pal.2013.0012.
- "'I Am Not Just From Here': The Root of Hip Hop’s Cosmopolitanism". Souls: A Critical Journal of Black Politics, Culture and Society, vol. 15, no. 4 (2014).
- "N*ggas in Paris: Hip-Hop in Exile". Social Identities: Journal of the Study of Race, Nation and Culture. vol. 22, no. 2 (2016), pp. 150–159. doi:10.1080/13504630.2015.1121571.
- "Gladys Knight has earned the right to sing the national anthem at the Super Bowl". CNN (January 21, 2019).
- "Black Men and the Shame of Absenteeism." LEVEL (June 15, 2024).
- "The Art and Politics of Legendary Cartoonist Ollie Harrington." LEVEL (February 19, 2025).
- "The Other Three-Album Run that Defined Quincy Jones' Black Pop Sound." LEVEL (November 15, 2024).
- "The Myth of Jackie Robinson Being the White Man's Hero." LEVEL (April 15, 2025).
- "The Fascinating Connection Between Drake, Marvin Gaye, and Frank Sinatra." LEVEL (March 30, 2026).
- "R&B's Reinvention in the Post-Disco 1980s." LEVEL (May 29, 2026).

=== Editor ===
- That's the Joint: The Hip-Hop Studies Reader. with R. N. Bradley. New York: Routledge, 2023. ISBN 9781032412566.
