= Busfield =

Busfield is an English surname. Notable people with the surname include:

- David Busfield (born 1953), English rugby league player
- Joan Busfield (born 1940), British sociologist and psychologist
- Timothy Busfield (born 1957), American actor and television director
- William Busfield (1773–1851), English politician
