= National language =

Language with de jure or de facto national status

A national language is a language (or language variant, e.g. dialect) that has some connection—de facto or de jure—with a nation. The term is applied quite differently in various contexts. One or more languages spoken as first languages in the territory of a country may be referred to informally or designated in legislation as national languages of the country. National languages are mentioned in over 150 world constitutions.

C.M.B. Brann, with particular reference to India, suggests that there are "four quite distinctive meanings" for national language in a polity:

- "Territorial language" (chthonolect, sometimes known as chtonolect) of a particular people
- "Regional language" (choralect)
- "Language-in-common or community language" (demolect) used throughout a country
- "Central language" (politolect) used by government and perhaps having a symbolic value.

The last is usually given the title of official language. In some cases (e.g., the Philippines), several languages are designated as official and a national language is separately designated.

== Official versus national languages ==
"National language" and "official language" are best understood as two concepts or legal categories with ranges of meaning that may coincide, or may be intentionally separate. Stateless nations are not in the position to legislate an official language, but their languages may be sufficiently distinct and well-preserved to be national languages. Some languages may be recognized popularly as "national languages", while others may enjoy official recognition in use or promotion.

In many African countries, some or all indigenous African languages are officially used, promoted, or expressly allowed to be promoted (usually taught in schools and written in important publications) as semi-official languages whether by long-term legislation or short-term, case-by-case executive (government) measures. To be official, spoken and written languages may enjoy government or federalised use, major tax-funded promotion or at least full tolerance as to their teaching and employers' recognition in public education, standing on equal footing with the official language(s). Further, they may enjoy recognition as a language used in compulsory schooling and treasury money may be spent to teach or encourage adults in learning a language which is a minority language in a particular area to restore its understanding and spread its moral stories, rhymes, poems, phrases, songs, and other literary heritage which will promote social cohesion (where other languages remain) or will promote nationalist differentiation where another, non-indigenous language is deprecated.

== National languages ==
=== Bangladesh ===
Bengali, the sole official language of Bangladesh, is also the de jure and de facto national language of the country. Establishing Bengali as a national language was one of the key reasons for the independence of Bangladesh.

=== Bosnia and Herzegovina ===
Bosnia and Herzegovina de jure has three national languages — Bosnian, Croatian and Serbian — which are de facto varieties of one language, Serbo-Croatian. It is officially defined under the three names, corresponding to the country's constituent nations. The Latin and Cyrillic alphabets both have official and equal status.

=== Bulgaria ===
Bulgarian is the sole official language in Bulgaria.

=== Canada ===
Canada's official languages since the Official Languages Act of 1969 are English (Canadian English) and French (Canadian French). Depending on one's views of what constitutes a "nation", these two languages may be considered two equal national languages of the nation of Canada, or the national languages of two nations within one state, English Canada and French Canada.

Quebec nationalists consider Quebec French, the province's official language, the language of the Quebec nation. French is a recognized minority in Ontario, Manitoba and Newfoundland and Labrador. Acadian French, the national language of Acadians, is an official language of New Brunswick (and recognized minority in Quebec, Nova Scotia and Prince Edward Island). Newfoundland English dialects differ substantially from other Canadian English ones.

English and French are official in Canada's three territories; two legislate a variety of Indigenous languages in addition. Nunavut and the Northwest Territories (N.W.T.) have as official languages Inuktitut and Inuinnaqtun, with N.W.T. also have a further seven more (totalling eleven official languages): Cree, Dënesųłiné, Gwich’in, Inuvialuktun, North and South Slavey and Tłı̨chǫ. As these official languages are legislated at a territorial (sub-federal) level, they can be construed as national languages.

Besides these, there are many Indigenous languages of Canada, which are the national languages of one or more First Nations, Inuit or Métis peoples; a number of First Nations and Inuit homelands at the Indigenous government level legislate their language as an official language of the Nation, such as the Nisg̱a’a language by Nisg̱a’a and Inuvialuktun by Inuvialuit. Notably the Cree language is spoken (with variations) from Alberta to Labrador, Anishinaabemowin is spoken across central Canada, and Inuktitut is spoken across the Arctic, northern Quebec and Labrador.

=== China ===
There are many languages spoken across China, with most people speaking one of several varieties of Chinese. During successive imperial dynasties, the spoken language of the capital city served as the official spoken language and was used across the country by government officials who traveled to communicate with one another. Dialects used for this purpose in different eras included those of Xi'an, Luoyang, Nanjing, Beijing, and other historical capital cities.

After the Xinhai Revolution in 1911, the Kuomintang (Chinese nationalists) founded the Republic of China. In order to promote a sense of national unity and enhance the efficiency of communications within the nation, the government decided to designate a national language. The Beijing dialect of Mandarin and Guangzhou dialect of Cantonese were each proposed as the basis for a national language for China. In the beginning, there were attempts to introduce elements from other Chinese varieties into the national language in addition to those from the Beijing dialect; this was reflected in the first official dictionary of the national language, given the name 國語 (Pinyin: Guóyǔ, literally "national language"). But this artificial language had no native speakers and was difficult to learn, so it was abandoned in 1924. Ultimately, the Beijing dialect was chosen as the national language and it continued to be referred to as 國語 in Chinese in the Republic of China. Since then, the Beijing dialect has become the main standard for pronunciation, due to its prestigious status during the preceding Qing dynasty.

Still, elements from other dialects do exist in the standard language, which is now defined as reflecting the pronunciation of Beijing, the grammatical patterns of Mandarin dialects spoken in the northern parts of China, and the vocabulary of modern vernacular Chinese literature. The People's Republic of China renamed the national language 普通话 (Pinyin: Pǔtōnghuà, literally "common speech"), without otherwise changing the definition of the standard national language.

=== Croatia ===
The Croatian language is the official language of Croatia. "The Croatian language and the Latin script shall be in official use in the Republic of Croatia" in Article 12 of the Croatian Constitution.

=== Czech Republic ===
The Czech language is the national language of the Czech Republic.

=== Ethiopia ===
Amharic was the national language in Ethiopian Empire. The country is composed of at least 80 different ethnic nationalities. Its people altogether speak over 80 different languages. Amharic, Oromo, Tigrinya, Somali, and Afar are the official working languages of Ethiopia. Courts and legislation work in Amharic and the constitution of the country is written in Amharic in an official capacity. On a day-to-day basis, Amharic is used to issue driving licenses and report tax income, making it not a national language but official language of the government.

=== Finland ===
Finland has two national languages: the Finnish language and the Swedish language. The Constitution of Finland guarantees the right to use Finnish and Swedish in courts and other state institutions. Despite the large difference in the numbers of users, Swedish is not officially classified as a minority language but equal to Finnish. Both national languages are compulsory subjects in school (except for children with a third language as mother tongue) and a language test is a prerequisite for governmental offices where a university degree is required. The constitution also grants the Sami and the Roma peoples the right to maintain and develop their languages: The Sami have partial right to use Sami languages in official situations according to other laws.

=== Hungary ===
Hungarian is the official language in Hungary.

=== India ===
India has no national language. Hindi and English are the official languages in India, according to Article 343(1) of the Constitution of India. Gujarat High Court has stated that there is no official record or order declaring Hindi as the national language of the country.

The Union Government uses Hindi and English as official languages, such as for parliamentary proceedings and texts of federal laws. Communications between the Union Government and state governments are in Hindi with Region A and Region B states and in English with Region C states. State governments use their own native languages in official communications. They may adopt one or more of the 21 languages listed in the Indian constitution's eighth schedule—Assamese, Bengali, Bodo, Gujarati, Hindi, Kannada, Kashmiri, Konkani, Maithili, Malayalam, Marathi, Meitei, Nepali, Odia, Punjabi, Sanskrit, Santali, Sindhi, Tamil, Telugu and Urdu. The Supreme Court of India uses English as its sole official language; high courts in some states use other languages spoken in the state in addition to English.

The Supreme Court of India uses English in its proceedings and objects to attempts to make Hindi official in legal proceedings.

=== Indonesia ===
The official and national language of Indonesia is Indonesian, a language derived from Malay. Indonesia has more than 700 living languages, making it the second most linguistically diverse country after neighboring Papua New Guinea. These 700+ languages, however, are without official status, and some are in danger of extinction. The largest local language is Javanese.

=== Ireland ===
Irish is recognised by the Constitution of Ireland as the national language and first official language of Ireland, with English designated a second official language. Despite this, Irish English is the primary language spoken in Ireland; government and parliamentary business is principally carried on in English.

=== Israel ===
Hebrew was identified as the national language of the State of Israel with the adoption of the Nation-State Bill in 2018, with Arabic recognized as a language with "special status" used in state institutions. One-fifth of the Israeli population (mostly Israeli Arabs) speak Arabic natively; they have the legal right to receive education and other services in Arabic. Arabic is rarely spoken in the Knesset, though permissible.

=== Italy ===
The Italian language is the de jure and de facto official language of Italy. Italian is also referred to as national language for historical and cultural reasons, because since the 15th century, Italian became the language used in the courts of nearly every state in Italy and in general among educated Italians (scholars, writers, poets, philosophers, scientists, composers and artists) who contributed to what is nowadays the culture of Italy. Furthermore, Italian was often an official language of the various Italian states before unification, slowly replacing Latin, even when ruled by foreign powers (such as the Spaniards in the Kingdom of Naples, or the Austrians in the Kingdom of Lombardy–Venetia).

=== Kenya ===
While English and Swahili are official languages, Swahili also has a special status as national language. None of the country's biggest languages (Gikuyu, Luo, Kamba, Kalenjin, etc.) have any explicit legal status on the national level, but the 2010 constitution enjoins the state to "promote and protect the diversity of language of the people of Kenya."

=== Lebanon ===
In Lebanon, the Arabic language is the "official national" language. Modern Standard Arabic is used for official purposes, while the everyday spoken language is Lebanese Arabic. French and English are also widespread in Lebanon.

=== Luxembourg ===
Luxembourg uses three official languages: Luxembourgish, French, and German. Previously Luxembourgish had no official status, but following a constitutional revision a law was passed on 24 February 1984 making Luxembourgish the national language. Furthermore, this law recognised the three languages of Luxembourg (Luxembourgish, French and German) as administrative languages.

=== Malaysia ===
The Malay language is the national language of Malaysia in accordance with Article 152(1) of the Federal Constitution of Malaysia.

=== Maldives ===
Dhivehi is the national language of Maldives per the Maldivian constitution.

=== Malta ===
The Maltese language is the national language of Malta. It is also the official language of the island, together with English. Maltese only is recognised as "national" in Chapter 1 of the Laws of Malta.

=== Namibia ===
Although English is the only nationwide official language in Namibia, there are also 20 national languages, which are each spoken by more or less sizeable portions of the population and are considered Namibia's cultural heritage. All national languages have the rights of a minority language and may even serve as a lingua franca in certain regions. Among Namibia's national languages are German, Afrikaans, Oshiwambo, Otjiherero, as well as the languages of the Himba, Nama, San, Kavango and Damara.

=== Nepal ===
Nepali is the official language in the federal government of Nepal. Over 123 languages are spoken in Nepal, all of which are granted constitutional status as rāṣṭrabhāṣā (राष्ट्रभाषा), officially translated as 'languages of the nation' (the word rāṣṭrabhāṣā also simply means 'national language'). Some of the languages include: Nepal Bhasa, Tamang, Sherpa, Rai, Magar, Gurung, Maithili, Awadhi, English, Limbu, Bhojpuri, etc.

=== Netherlands ===
Dutch is the official language of the Netherlands. In the province of Friesland, Frisian is also spoken and is recognized as the second official language.

=== New Zealand ===
While the population of New Zealand is predominantly English-speaking, the language of the indigenous Polynesian people is the Māori language. Both these languages have official status in the country, along with New Zealand Sign Language, which is one of the few sign languages in the world to have such status.

=== Nigeria ===
Besides official English (Nigerian Standard English), Nigeria recognizes three 'majority', or national, languages. These are Hausa, Igbo, and Yoruba, each with some 20 million speakers or more.

=== Pakistan ===
Article 251(1) of the 1973 Constitution of Pakistan, titled National language, specifies: "The National language of Pakistan is Urdu, and arrangements shall be made for its being used for official and other purposes within fifteen years from the commencing day." Although Urdu has been declared an official language, so far all government documents, legislation, legal orders, and other official records are written in Pakistani English. Most higher education instruction is in English. The National Language Authority is an organization established to make arrangements to promote Urdu since 1979.

=== Philippines ===
Filipino is the national language of the Philippines. Which is a standardized form of a dialect of Tagalog, as written and spoken in Metro Manila and other urban centers of the archipelago. The 1987 Constitution mandates that the Filipino language should be further enriched and developed by the languages of the Philippines. As the national language. It also designated both Filipino and English as the official languages for purposes of communication and instruction, and designated the regional languages as auxiliary official languages in the regions to serve as auxiliary media of instruction therein.

More than 170 languages are spoken in the Philippines and almost all of them belong to the Philippine subgroup of the Austronesian language family. In September 2012, La Union became the first province in Philippine history to pass an ordinance proclaiming a local language. It declared Ilocano as an official language. This move aims to protect and revitalize the use of Ilocano in various government and civil affairs within the province.

The Filipino Sign Language is designated as the "national sign language of the Filipino deaf" as well as the official sign language for transactions of the Philippine government.

=== Poland ===
Article 27 of the Constitution states: "Polish shall be the official language in the Republic of Poland".

=== Portugal ===
Portuguese is the sole official language of Portugal.

=== Romania ===
The official and national language of Romania is the Romanian language.

=== Russia ===
The Russian language is the only national language of Russia and had federal official status, but 27 other languages are considered official in different Federal subjects of Russia.

=== Saudi Arabia ===
The first article of the Basic Law of Saudi Arabia states that Arabic is the official language of Saudi Arabia.

=== Serbia ===
Serbian is the official and national language of Serbia.

=== Singapore ===
Singapore has four official languages: English (Singaporean English), Chinese (Singaporean Mandarin), Malay and Tamil. Although English is the primary language of business, government, and education, Malay is designated as the national language. This is due to the recognition of ethnic Malays (approximately 14% of the population) as the indigenous peoples of Singapore.

Traditionally, the lingua franca among the different ethnic groups in Singapore was Bazaar Malay, a Malay-based creole. Since independence, the government has been promoting English as the main language of Singapore. The bilingual education policy requires students to study two languages: English and a "mother tongue" corresponding to the student's ethnicity. Malay is only offered to non-Malay students as an optional third language in secondary schools. As a result, English has displaced Bazaar Malay as the common language among Singaporeans. Therefore, despite the status of Malay as the national language, the majority doesn't speak it.

=== Slovakia ===
The Slovak language is the national language of Slovakia.

=== Slovenia ===
The Slovene language is the national language of Slovenia. There are 6 minority languages.

=== South Africa ===
South Africa has 12 official languages, namely Afrikaans, English, South Ndebele, Northern Sotho, Southern Sotho, Swati, Tswana, Tsonga, Venda, Xhosa and Zulu, and on July of 2023, South African Sign Language was made the twelfth official language of South Africa by constitutional amendment.

The South African constitution further explicitly supports the promotion of the indigenous Khoisan languages; Sign language; community languages such as German, Greek, Gujarati, Hindi, Portuguese, Tamil, Telugu, Urdu; and languages used for religious purposes such as Arabic, Hebrew, and Sanskrit.

=== Spain ===
Spain has one national constitutional language, Spanish or Castilian, but there are four other languages that are co-official in some territories: Galician language in Galicia, Basque in Euskadi and part of Navarre, Catalan language in Catalonia, Balearic Islands and Valencia (as Valencian), and Aranese in Val d'Aran.

=== Sri Lanka ===
The Sinhala Language and Tamil are the national languages of Sri Lanka.

=== Switzerland ===
The logo of the Swiss Federal administration, in the four national languages of Switzerland

Switzerland has four national languages: German, French, Italian and Romansh, all of which have official status at the national level within the Federal administration of Switzerland.

A majority (60%) of the population speaks German, while most of the remainder (21%) speak French, and minorities speak Italian (10%) and Romansh (7%, not monolingually). German speakers are predominant in most of the country, while French speakers occupy the western parts near the border with France, and the Italian speakers are situated to the south near the border with Italy, mostly within the Canton of Ticino. The Romansh speakers are concentrated in the Canton of Grisons in the south-east.

=== Syria ===
Arabic is the official language of Syria and Kurdish is a recognized national language.

=== Taiwan ===
A national language in Taiwan is legally defined as "a natural language used by an original people group of Taiwan and the Taiwan Sign Language". This includes Formosan languages, Hakka, Mandarin, Taiwanese Hokkien and Matsu dialect.

During Japanese rule (1895 to 1945), the "national language movement" (國語運動, kokugo undō) promoted the Japanese language. After their defeat in the Chinese Civil War in 1949, the Kuomintang regime of the Republic of China retreated to the island of Taiwan, where they introduced Standard Chinese and English language, which were spoken by few of the island population at the time, to be the "national language". Today however, the National languages development act recognises languages of all people groups of Taiwan to be national languages.

=== Tunisia ===
The official language of the Tunisian state is Modern Standard Arabic. However, it is not the mother tongue of the population. Therefore, it is not often used to communicate between Tunisian people, instead Tunisian Arabic plays these roles and is the national language of Tunisia. Furthermore, even without an official status, French is also known by 63.6% of the population. It is used extensively in its written and spoken form in administration, education, and business environments. Berber minorities in the south-west and on Djerba Island also use the Tunisian Chelha language.

=== United Kingdom ===
The English language (British English) is the de facto official language of the United Kingdom and is the sole language of an estimated 95% of the British population. The three Home Nations outside England have national languages of their own with varying degrees of recognition, which coexist with the dominant English language. Britain also has several Crown Dependencies and Overseas Territories which are to some extent self-governing, but are not recognized as independent states. Many of these have their own regional languages.

==== Northern Ireland ====
In Northern Ireland, both the Irish language and the Ulster Scots dialects are recognized by the Good Friday Agreement as "part of the cultural wealth of the island of Ireland" and are promoted by the Foras na Gaeilge (Irish Institute) and Tha Boord o Ulstèr-Scotch (the Ulster-Scots Agency) respectively.

English was the sole official language until 2022 when the Identity and Language (Northern Ireland) Act 2022 was passed which gave Irish official status in Northern Ireland.

==== Scotland ====
In Scotland, Scottish Gaelic is a minority language spoken by 57,375 people (1.1% of the Scottish population aged over three years old). The Gaelic Language (Scotland) Act 2005 gives the language a limited official status, and the Bòrd na Gàidhlig is tasked with "securing the status of the Gaelic language as an official language of Scotland commanding equal respect to the English language". Scots, generally treated as a West Germanic language related to but separate from English, has no official status but is recognized as a minority language, and is the language of much Scottish literature, including the poetry of Robert Burns.

==== Wales ====
The Welsh language has official status within Wales, and as of the 2011 census, is spoken by 562,000 people, or 19% of the population. The Welsh Language Board (Bwrdd yr Iaith Gymraeg) is legally tasked with ensuring that, "in the conduct of public business and the administration of justice, the English and Welsh languages should be treated on a basis of equality".

==== Crown Dependencies ====
===== Isle of Man =====
English is de facto the only official language. However a few words of Manx Gaelic (the historical national language) are sometimes encountered in government institutions, largely for symbolic and ceremonial purposes, and it is the main medium of instruction in one primary school.

==== Regions of England ====
===== Cornwall =====
English is the de facto main language spoken in the county of Cornwall. Historically, the main language of Cornwall was Cornish. By 1800, Cornish was endangered with some debate about a mythical last speaker of the Cornish language. Revival of the Cornish language and some recognition has occurred in the 20th century.

=== United States ===
In the United States, English is the de facto national language, although the country has no official language specified in its constitution. President Donald Trump declared English the official language of the United States in 2025.

=== Vietnam ===
In Vietnam, the Vietnamese language had been the de facto national language for many years, but it was not until Decree No. 5 of the 2013 constitution that the Vietnamese language was officially described as the National Language.

== See also ==
- Ethnolect
- Indigenous language
- Language policy
- Regional language
- Standard language
- Official language
- Working language
- Bengali language movement in former East Pakistan, now Bangladesh
- Anti-Hindi agitations of Tamil Nadu, India
- Global language system
