= Eudine Barriteau =

Grenadian gender and public policy professor (born 1954)

The Most Honourable Eudine Barriteau FB, GCM
- Born: 10 December 1954 (age 71); Grenada

Academic background
- Education: Howard University, Washington DC

Academic work
- Discipline: Gender and development
- Institutions: University of the West Indies at Cave Hill
- Awards: GCM

Violet Eudine Barriteau, FB, GCM (10 December 1954), is a professor of gender and public policy, as well as Principal of the University of the West Indies at Cave Hill. She was also the president of the International Association for Feminist Economics (IAFFE) from 2009 to 2010, and she is on the advisory editorial boards of Palimpsest: A Journal on Women, Gender, and the Black International, published by SUNY Press, and Signs: Journal of Women in Culture and Society, published by University of Chicago Press.

Her research interests encompass feminist theorizing, gender and public policy, investigations of the Caribbean political economy, and theorizing heterosexual women's socio-sexual unions.

Barriteau was appointed a Member of the Order of Freedom of Barbados (FB) in the 2019 Independence Day Honours List, "for her outstanding contribution to tertiary education and pioneering leadership in the development of gender studies and the promotion of gender equality."

In 2024, Barriteau was elected in a vote at the United Nations (UN) in New York to serve on the United Nations Committee on the Elimination of Discrimination against Women (CEDAW) based in Geneva, Switzerland.

== Early life ==
Violet Eudine Barriteau was born 10 December 1954, in the Caribbean island of Grenada and migrated to Barbados in 1966. She attended Ellerslie Secondary School.

== Education ==
Barriteau gained her teacher training certificate from Erdiston Teachers' Training College, and her BSc degree in public administration and accounting in 1980 from University of the West Indies at Cave Hill in Barbados. She later studied at the New York University, New York and qualified for her MPA degree in public administration (public sector financial management) in 1984. Barriteau travelled to the Philippines, to the International Rice Research Institute for a certificate in editing and publications training which she completed in 1986. Finally she returned to America for her doctoral studies, and in 1994 obtained a PhD degree in political science from Howard University, Washington, D.C., with her specialization being political economy and political theory.

== Career ==
- 1972–1978 Teacher, St. George Secondary School.
- 1980–1982 Research Assistant, Institute of Social and Economic Research, University of the West Indies (UWI), Cave Hill, Barbados.
- 1981–1982 Part-time Teacher (tutorials), Faculty of Social Sciences, UWI, Cave Hill, Department of Political Science.
- 1984–1985 Part-time Teacher (tutorials), Faculty of Social Sciences, UWI, Cave Hill, Department of Political Science.
- 1984–1986 Jr. Research Fellow, Institute of Social and Economic Research, UWI, Cave Hill.
- 1985–1986 Part-time Teacher (tutorials), Faculty of Social Sciences, UWI, Cave Hill, Department of Political Science.
- Sept–Dec 1986 Teacher, Harrison College, Bridgetown, Barbados.
- 1987–1988 Research Fellow, Institute of Social and Economic Research, UWI, Cave Hill.
- Jan–May 1989 Consultant Editor, Journal of Caribbean Law.
- 1988–1989 Publications Specialist, UNESCO/Caribbean Community (CARICOM), Educational Publishing Project, Barbados.
- May–Aug 1991 Temporary Research Fellow, Institute of Social and Economic Research, UWI, Cave Hill.
- 1989–1992 Postgraduate Teaching Assistant, Howard University, Washington, D.C., US.
- 1992–1993 Lecturer and Deputy Coordinator, Women and Development Studies Programme, UWI, Cave Hill.
- 1993–2000 Head and Lecturer, Centre for Gender and Development Studies, UWI, Cave Hill.
- 1996 Staff Fellow, Institute of Social Studies, The Hague, Netherlands.
- 1996–1999 Caribbean Coordinator for DAWN, (Development Alternatives of Women for a New Era).
- Aug–Dec 1997 Inaugural Fellow of the Dame Nita Barrow Distinguished Women in Development Visitor Programme, Ontario Institute for Studies in Education, University of Toronto, Canada.
- 2000 Senior Fulbright Fellow, Howard University, Washington, D.C.
- 2000 – May 2004 Head and Senior Lecturer, Centre for Gender and Development Studies, UWI, Cave Hill.
- 2004–2008 Head and Professor, Centre for Gender and Development Studies, UWI, Cave Hill.
- 2004–2008 Campus Coordinator, School for Graduate Studies and Research, UWI, Cave Hill.
- 2008 International Fellow, GEXcel International Collegium for Advanced Transdisciplinary Gender Studies (GEXcel), Örebro University, Sweden.
- 2008 – current Deputy Principal, UWI, Cave Hill.
- 2009–2010 President, International Association for Feminist Economics (IAFFE)
- 2010 International Fellow, GEXcel, Örebro University, Sweden.
- 2012–2015 International Advisory Board, Signs: Journal of Women in Culture and Society, published by University of Chicago Press.
- 2012 – current International Advisory Board, Palimpsest: A Journal on Women, Gender, and the Black International, published by SUNY Press.
- 2015 – appointed as Principal of UWI Cave Hill Campus. She is the first female to serve in the capacity.

== Honours ==
- 2004 Best Selling Textbook award, University of the West Indies Press, for her book Confronting power, theorizing gender interdisciplinary perspectives in the Caribbean.
- 2011 Tenth CARICOM Triennial Award for Women, for her outstanding contribution to gender and development and the socio-economic development of the Caribbean Community. Awarded at the opening ceremony of the Thirty-Second Regular Meeting of the Conference of Heads of Government of the Caribbean Community (CARICOM) Secretariat.
- 2013 Gold Crown Merit, for her contribution to gender and development.

== Selected bibliography ==
=== Books ===
- Barriteau, Eudine; Emmanuel, Patrick; Brathwaite, Farley (1986). Political change and public opinion in Grenada: 1979–1984. West Indies: University of the West Indies (original from University of Texas).
- Barriteau, Eudine; Connelly, M. Patricia; Parpart, Jane L (2000). Theoretical perspectives on gender and development. Ottawa: International Development Research Centre (IDRC). ISBN 9780889369108.
- Barriteau, Eudine (2001). The political economy of gender in the twentieth-century Caribbean. Houndmills, Basingstoke, Hampshire New York: Palgrave. ISBN 9780333732823.
- Barriteau, Eudine; Cobley, Alan G (2001). Stronger, surer, bolder: Ruth Nita Barrow: social change and international development. Barbados: Centre for Gender and Development Studies, Cave Hill and University of the West Indies Press. ISBN 9789766401016. See also Nita Barrow.
- Barriteau, Eudine (2003). Confronting power, theorizing gender interdisciplinary perspectives in the Caribbean. Kingston, Jamaica Great Britain: University of the West Indies Press. ISBN 9789766401368.
- Barriteau, Eudine; Cobley, Alan G (2006). Enjoying power: Eugenia Charles and political leadership in the Commonwealth Caribbean. Kingston, Jamaica: University of the West Indies Press. ISBN 9789766401917.
- Barriteau, Eudine (2012). Love and power: Caribbean discourses on gender. Kingston, Jamaica: University of the West Indies Press Cave Hill, Barbados Institute for Gender and Development Studies, Nita Barrow Unit. ISBN 9789766402655.

=== Journal articles ===
- Barriteau, Eudine (December 2003). "Constructing a conceptual framework for developing women's transformational leadership in the Caribbean". Social and Economic Studies. 52 (4). University of the West Indies: 5–48. JSTOR 27865352.

== Personal life ==
Barriteau has a son, Cabral.

== See also ==
- Feminist economics
- List of feminist economists

Non-profit organisation positions
Preceded by Susan Himmelweit	President of the International Association for Feminist Economics; 2009–2010	Succeeded by Stephanie Seguino
