= Branta (disambiguation) =

Branta is a genus of birds, collectively known as black geese.

Branta may also refer to:

- Branta (journal), an ornithological publication
- Cathy Branta (born 1963), American runner

== See also ==
- Brant (disambiguation)
