= Branded =

Branded may refer to:

- Branded (1920 film), a British silent drama film
- Branded (1931 film), a Western film
- Branded (1950 film), a Western film
- Branded (2012 film), a science fiction film
- Branded (Bonfire album), 2011
- Branded (Isaac Hayes album), 1995
- "Branded" (Dad's Army), a 1969 episode of the British comedy series Dad's Army
- Branded (TV series), an American Western TV series that aired in 1965 and 1966
- Branded, a newsletter published by Check My Ads
- "Branded", a song by Lita Ford from the album Living Like a Runaway, 2012

== See also ==
- Brand (disambiguation)
- Branding (disambiguation)
