= Tracy Denean Sharpley-Whiting =

American scholar

- Education: University of Rochester; Brown University
- Occupations: Gertrude Conaway Vanderbilt Distinguished Professor of Humanities in the Departments of African American and Diaspora Studies and French and Italian at the Vanderbilt University College of Arts and Science former Associate Provost for Academic Advancement, Vice Provost for Arts, Libraries and Global Engagement
- Known for: Feminist scholar

Tracy Denean Sharpley-Whiting is a feminist scholar, comparative Europeanist, and Gertrude Conaway Vanderbilt Distinguished Professor of Humanities in the Departments of African American and Diaspora Studies and Romance Languages, Cultures and Diasporas at Vanderbilt University where she served as the inaugural Vice Provost of Arts, Libraries, and Global Engagement and continues to serve as Director of the Callie House Research Center for the Study of Global Black Cultures and Politics. She served as Associate Provost for Academic Advancement from October 2021-June 2022. She was also the Chair of African American and Diaspora Studies (2018-2022). She is editor of The Speech: Race and Barack Obama's "A More Perfect Union", and founding senior co-editor of the academic journal Palimpsest: A Journal on Women, Gender, and the Black International. She is also series co-editor of "Philosophy and Race" (SUNY Press) with philosopher Robert Bernasconi.

== Biography ==
Sharpley-Whiting received the PhD in French Studies from Brown in 1994.

She served as Director of the William T. Bandy Center for Baudelaire and Modern French Studies from 2006-2012.

In September 2007, Sharpley-Whiting testified before Congress at the hearing, From Imus to Industry: The Business of Stereotypes and Degrading Images. She served on the Executive Council of the Modern Language Association from 2014-2018. She also served as chair/president of the Executive Advisory Committee for the Association of Departments of Foreign Languages and Literatures (now Association of Language Departments). Sharpley-Whiting is a former Camargo Foundation Fellow (Cassis, France); a George and Eliza Howard Foundation Fellow; and a Rockefeller Foundation Fellow at the Bellagio Study Center (Bellagio, Italy). She is a Fellow of the American Academy of Arts and Sciences.

== Awards and honors ==
In 2020, Sharpley-Whiting won the SEC (SouthEastern Conference) Faculty Achievement Award for Vanderbilt University for her research and teaching. Sharpley-Whiting was named one of the top 100 young leaders of the African American community by The Root, an online magazine founded by scholar Henry Louis Gates Jr. She received the 2006 Horace Mann Medal from Brown University. The award is given annually by the Brown Graduate School to an alumnus or alumna who has made significant contributions in his or her field, inside or outside of academia. She is also the recipient of the 2025 Distinguished Alumni Award (School of Arts and Sciences) from the University of Rochester. Her book, Pimps Up, Ho's Down: Hip Hop's Hold on Young Black Women, received the Emily Toth Award for the Best Single Work by One or More Authors in Women's Issues in Popular and American Culture in a specific year from the Popular Culture Association/American Culture Association. Her book, Bricktop's Paris: African American Women in Jazz-Age Paris and The Autobiography of Ada Bricktop Smith, or Miss Baker Regrets was a 2015 Choice Outstanding Academic Title and The American Library in Paris 2015 Book Award Long List Nominee.

== Selected works ==
=== Single authored books ===
- Sharpley-Whiting, Tracy Denean (1998). Frantz Fanon conflicts and feminisms. Lanham, Maryland: Rowman & Littlefield. ISBN 9780847686391.
- Sharpley-Whiting, Tracy Denean (1999). Black Venus: sexualized savages, primal fears, and primitive narratives in French. Durham, N.C: Duke University Press. ISBN 9780822323402.
- Sharpley-Whiting, Tracy Denean (2002). Negritude women. Minneapolis: University of Minnesota Press. ISBN 9780816636808.
- Sharpley-Whiting, Tracy Denean (2007). Pimps up, ho's down: hip hop's hold on young Black women. New York: New York University Press. ISBN 9780814740644.
- Sharpley-Whiting, Tracy Denean (2015). Bricktop's Paris: African American women in jazz-age Paris. Albany: State University of New York Press. ISBN 9781438455013.

=== Edited and co-edited books ===
- Sharpley-Whiting, Tracy Denean; Gilles Boëtsch; Nicolas Bancel; Pascal Blanchard; Sylvie Chalaye; Fanny Robles; Jean-François Staszak; Christelle Taraud; Dominic Thomas; Naïma Yahi (2019). Sexualités, identité & corps colonisés: XV^{e} siècle – XXI^{e} siècle. Paris: Groupe de Recherche ACHAC. ISBN 9782271130501.
- Sharpley-Whiting, Tracy Denean avec collaboration de Roger Little (2018). La Vénus hottentote: écrits, 1810 à 1814, suivi des textes inédits. Paris: Editions L'Harmattan. ISBN 9782343154398.
- Sharpley-Whiting, Tracy Denean; Leitch, Vincent B; Cain, William E; Finke, Laurie A; Johnson, Barbara E; McGowan, John; Williams, Jeffrey J (2018). The Norton anthology of theory and criticism. New York London: W.W. Norton & Co. ISBN 9780393602951.
- Sharpley-Whiting, Tracy Denean; Leitch, Vincent B; Cain, William E; Finke, Laurie A; Johnson, Barbara E; McGowan, John; Williams, Jeffrey J (2010). The Norton anthology of theory and criticism. New York London: W.W. Norton & Co. ISBN 9780393932928.
- Sharpley-Whiting, Tracy Denean (2009). The speech: race and Barack Obama's "A more perfect union". New York: Bloomsbury. ISBN 9781596916678.
- Nardal, Paulette (2009). Beyond negritude : essays from Woman in the city. Translated by Sharpley-Whiting, Tracy Denean. Albany: SUNY Press. ISBN 9781438429465.
- Sharpley-Whiting, Tracy Denean; James, Joy (2000). The Black feminist reader. Oxford, UK Malden, Mass: Blackwell. ISBN 9780631210078.
- Sharpley-Whiting, Tracy Denean; White, Renée T, eds. (1997). Spoils of war: women of color, cultures, and revolutions. Chela Sandoval (foreword). Lanham: Rowman & Littlefield. ISBN 9780847686056.
- Sharpley-Whiting, Tracy Denean; Gordon, Lewis; White, Renée T (1996). Fanon: a critical reader. Oxford Cambridge, Mass: Blackwell Publishers. ISBN 9781557868961.
