= Diana Gittins =

- Born: 20 October 1946 (age 79); USA
- Education: University of Essex
- Occupation: Lecturer in creative writing
- Writing career
- Notable work: Madness in Its Place:Narratives of Severalls Hospital 1913-1997
- Website: www.dianagittins.co.uk

Diana Gittins (born 20 October 1946), is a former associate lecturer in creative writing for the Open University and a published writer of fiction and non-fiction books.

Gittins is the author of Madness in Its Place: Narratives of Severalls Hospital 1913-1997, which was adapted for broadcast for BBC Radio 4.

== Biography ==
Diana Gittins spent her childhood in New England, USA and moved to Devon in the UK when she was 14.

After attending Dartington Hall School, Devon she studied at the University of Paris for a year, University of Essex, and later at Bath Spa University. She has two masters, one in social history and one in writing for young people. She also has a PhD in sociology.

Gittins has had a number of jobs through the years, but her academic roles have included: being a research fellow at the University of Essex; a lecturer at Plymouth University; a lecturer at Colgate University, US; as well as a part-time associate lecturer of creative writing for the Open University.

She lives with her partner in Exeter.

== Awards ==
- Hawthornden Castle Fellowship
- Shortlisted for the 2009 Cinnamon Poetry Pamphlet competition
- Guernsey International Poetry on the Buses competition, 2011
- Flamingo Feather Poetry Competition (second place)

== Publications ==
=== Books ===
==== Poetry ====
- Gittins, Diana (1994). Dance of the sheet. Nether Stowey: Odyssey Poets. ISBN 9781897654545.
- Gittins, Diana (2010), "Repulsive II", in Fortune-Wood, Rowan (ed.), The visitors & other stories & poems, Blaenau Ffestiniog, Gwynedd: Cinnamon Press, ISBN 9781907090059
- Gittins, Diana (2010), "Hale New Moon Bopp", in Fortune-Wood, Rowan (ed.), The visitors & other stories & poems, Blaenau Ffestiniog, Gwynedd: Cinnamon Press, ISBN 9781907090059
- Gittins, Diana (2010), "I Should Have Moved On", in Loveday, Mike; Gordon, Rudy (eds.), 14 Magazine, no. 9, March 2010, Online - selected editions, ISSN 1744-7763 "I Should Have Moved On" by Diana Gittins
- Gittins, Diana (2013). BORK!. Glenrothes, Fife, Scotland: HappenStance. ISBN 9781905939916.

==== Prose ====
- Gittins, Diana (Summer 2009), "Prose", in Caddy, David (ed.), Tears in the fence, No 50, Dorset, UK: David Caddy, ISSN 0266-5816
- Gittins, Diana (Spring–Summer 2010), "Move the Castle", in Rapi, Nina (ed.), Brand literary magazine 06, online: BRAND Literary Magazine, pp. 109–112, ISSN 1754-0593 Pdf of magazine contents.
- Gittins, Diana (Summer 2012), "Prose", in Caddy, David (ed.), Tears in the fence, No 55, Dorset, UK: David Caddy, ISSN 0266-5816

==== Non-fiction ====
- Gittins, Diana (1982). Fair sex: family size and structure, 1900-39. London: Hutchinson. ISBN 9780091454913.
- Gittins, Diana; Himmelweit, Susan F; Crowley, Helen (1992). Issues in women's studies (book 1B). Milton Keynes: Open University. ISBN 9780749201050.
- Gittins, Diana (1993). The family in question: changing households and familiar ideologies (second ed.). Basingstoke: Macmillan (Series: women in society, a feminist list). ISBN 9780333545706.
- Gittins, Diana (1998). Madness in its place: narratives of Severalls Hospital, 1913-1997. London New York: Routledge. ISBN 9780415183888.
- Gittins, Diana (1998). The child in question. Basingstoke: Macmillan. ISBN 9780333511091.

== See also ==
- Severalls Hospital
- Creative writing
