= Severalls Hospital =

- North Essex Partnership University NHS Foundation Trust
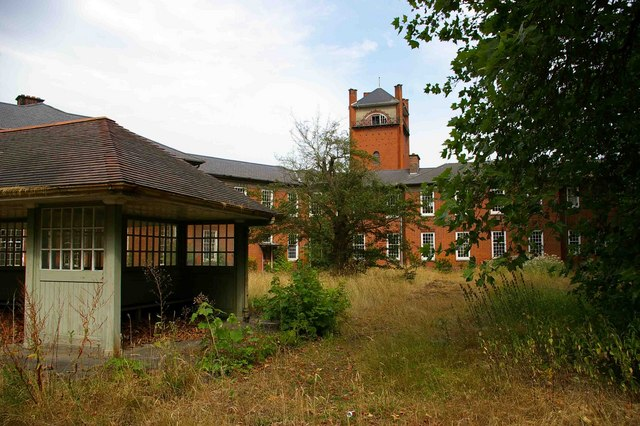
- Severalls Hospital

- Shown in Essex

Geography
- Location: Colchester, Essex, England, United Kingdom
- Coordinates: 51.91852°N 0.89374°E

Organisation
- Care system: Public
- Type: Psychiatric
- Affiliated university: None

Services
- Emergency department: No Accident & Emergency

History
- Founded: 1913
- Closed: 1997

Links
- Lists: Hospitals in England

Severalls Hospital was a psychiatric hospital in Colchester, Essex, England. It was managed by the North Essex Partnership University NHS Foundation Trust.

== History ==
=== Early history ===
The hospital was designed by Frank Whitmore, the county architect, and William Town using an echelon formation layout. The foundation stone was laid by Sir Thomas Barrett-Lennard in June 1910 and it opened as the Second Essex County Asylum in May 1913. Villas were constructed around the main hospital building as accommodation blocks and there was a detached building for the medical superintendent. The construction cost was £188,350. The hospital covers a 300-acre site and the administration building is Grade II listed. The main building covered 14 acres. The nurses' home was extended and the whole facility was renamed the Essex and Colchester Mental Hospital in the 1930s.

In August 1942 the hospital was subjected to a bombing by the Luftwaffe. Three 500lb bombs were dropped on the west wing of the hospital and 38 patients were killed, many of which were buried in nearby Colchester Cemetery. Immediately after the bombing a 21-year-old nurse of the hospital, Murial Jackson, attempted to save patients and was able to direct doctors to the injured using just a torch.

=== Psychiatric experiments ===
In the 1950s psychiatrists experimented with new treatments on patients using practices now considered unsuitable such as the use of frontal lobotomy. A project was subsequently initiated by the North East Essex Mental Health Trust to research this. Joan Busfield, Professor of Sociology at the University of Essex, proposed a former research student of hers, Diana Gittins. Funding was secured by the Trust and the study commenced in May 1995 for a two-year period.

In her book Madness in Its Place: Narratives of Severalls Hospital, 1913–1997, Gittins, summarised her research, noting that often women were admitted by their own family, sometimes as the result of bearing illegitimate children or because they had been raped. As they would not always (or were unable to) carry out daily tasks, they were considered to be insane and some were even subjected to electroconvulsive therapy and lobotomy.

=== Closure and redevelopment ===
The hospital joined the National Health Service in 1948. After the introduction of Care in the Community in the early 1980s the hospital went into a period of decline. Most of the hospital was closed in the early 1990s; a remaining section used to treat elderly patients was eventually closed in March 1997. The North Essex Partnership University NHS Foundation Trust announced the sale of the site to a consortium of Bellway, Taylor Wimpey and Bloor Homes in February 2016. The consortium submitted plans to redevelop the site for residential use in July 2018. By 2024 some of the original hospital buildings has been converted to residential use and another 730 new homes had been built.
