= Branding =

Branding may refer to:

== Physical markings ==
- Making a mark, typically by charring:
  - Wood branding, permanently marking, by way of heat, typically of wood (also applied to plastic, cork, leather, etc.)
  - Livestock branding, the marking of animals to indicate ownership
  - Human branding, body modification done for various reasons, voluntary and involuntary, throughout history
  - Freeze branding, permanently marking by way of cold
- Vehicle title branding, a permanent designation indicating that a vehicle has been "written off"

== Marketing ==
- Brand, a name, logo, slogan, and/or design scheme associated with a product or service
  - Branding (promotional), the distribution of merchandise with a brand name or symbol imprinted
  - Brand management, the application of marketing techniques to a specific product, product line, or brand
  - Employer branding, the application of brand management to recruitment marketing and internal brand engagement
  - Internet branding, brand management on the Internet
  - Nation branding, the application of marketing and brand management techniques for the advancement of a country
    - Place branding, the application of marketing and place promotion techniques for the advancement of country subdivisions (mostly tourism and investments)
  - Personal branding, people and their careers marketed as brands (also reputation equity)
  - Co-branding, two companies or brands partnering on a product or service
  - Branding agency, a type of marketing agency, group or a firm which specializes in creating brands
  - Faith branding, the application of marketing techniques to religious institutions or individuals
  - School branding, the application of marketing techniques to education organizations

== See also ==
- Branded (disambiguation)
