= Susan Himmelweit =

British economist and emeritus professor

- Born: Susan Felicity Himmelweit; 8 August 1948 (age 78)

Academic background
- Education: Cambridge University

Academic work
- Discipline: Feminist economics
- Institutions: Open University, UK

Notes
- Open University profile.

Susan 'Sue' Felicity Himmelweit (born 8 August 1948) is a British economist, emeritus professor of economics for the Open University in the UK, and was the 2009 president of the International Association for Feminist Economics (IAFFE).

== Career ==
Other bodies which Himmelweit is connected to include: principal investigator on an Economic and Social Research Council (ESRC) funded research project entitled, Gender and intra-household entitlements – a cross-national longitudinal analysis (GenIX); member of an international network on care policy called Political and Social Economy of Care in a Globalising World (PASEC), funded by Nordic Centre of Excellence's REASSESS scheme looking at the Nordic economic and social model; member of the management committee for the Women's Budget Group; member of the editorial board of Feminist Economics; and member of the editorial board of the Journal of Women, Politics & Policy.

== Education ==
Himmelweit attended Cambridge University where she gained a doctorate in economics.

== Politics ==
In August 2015, Himmelweit endorsed Jeremy Corbyn's campaign in the Labour Party leadership election.

== Selected bibliography ==
=== Books ===
- Himmelweit, Susan F; Birke, Lynda; Vines, Gail (1990). Tomorrow's child: reproductive technologies in the 90s. London: Virago Press. ISBN 9781853811456.
- Himmelweit, Susan F; Crowley, Helen (1992). Knowing women: feminism and knowledge. Cambridge, England Cambridge, MA, USA: Polity Press in Association with the Open University. ISBN 9780745609768.
- Himmelweit, Susan F; Crowley, Helen (1992). Issues in women's studies (book 1A). Milton Keynes: Open University. ISBN 9780749201029.
- Himmelweit, Susan F; Gittins, Diana; Crowley, Helen (1992). Issues in women's studies (book 1B). Milton Keynes: Open University. ISBN 9780749201050.
- Himmelweit, Susan F; Trigg, Andrew B (1998). Households. Milton Keynes, England: Open University. ISBN 9780749277352.
- Himmelweit, Susan F; Trigg, Andrew B (1998). Markets. Milton Keynes: Open University. ISBN 9780749277314.
- Himmelweit, Susan (2000). Inside the household: from labour to care. New York: St. Martin's Press (capital and class series). ISBN 9780333535868.

Reviewed by Robeyns, Ingrid (2001). "Inside the household: from labour to care, edited by Susan Himmelweit". Ethical Perspectives. 7 (3): 145–148. doi:10.1080/13545700110088331. S2CID 216643547.

- Himmelweit, Susan F; Trigg, Andrew B; Simonetti, Roberto (2001). Microeconomics: neoclassical and institutionalist perspectives on economic behaviour. London: Thomson Learning. ISBN 9781861525390.
- Himmelweit, Susan F; Humphries, Jane; Albelda, Randy P (2005). Dilemmas of lone motherhood. London New York: Routledge. ISBN 9780415360180.

=== Book chapters ===
- Himmelweit, Susan; Plomien, Ania (2014), "Feminist perspectives on care: theory, practice and policy", in Evans, Mary; Hemmings, Clare; Henry, Marsha; Johnstone, Hazel; Madhok, Sumi; Plomien, Ania; Wearing, Sadie (eds.), The SAGE handbook of feminist theory, Thousand Oaks, California: SAGE, pp. 446–464, ISBN 9781446252413.

=== Journal articles ===
- Himmelweit, Susan F.; Folbre, Nancy (March 2000). "Introduction - children and family policy: a feminist issue". Feminist Economics. 6 (1): 1–3. doi:10.1080/135457000337633.
- Himmelweit, Susan F.; Bergmann, Barbara; Green, Kate; Albelda, Randy P.; Women's Committee of One Hundred; Koren, Charlotte (July 2004). "Lone mothers: What is to be done?". Feminist Economics. 10 (2): 237–264. doi:10.1080/1354570042000217793. S2CID 154744396.

=== Economic discussion papers ===
- Himmelweit, Susan F (June 1995). Number 6 – The discovery of 'unpaid work': the social consequences of the expansion of 'work'. Open University.
- Himmelweit, Susan F (December 1995). Number 10 – What is a fair wage? A critique of the concept of the value of labour-power. Open University.
- Himmelweit, Susan (December 2000). Number 28 – Alternative rationalities, or why do economists become parents? (PDF). Open University.
- Himmelweit, Susan F (August 2001). Number 42 – Making visible the hidden economy: the case for gender impact analysis of economic policy (PDF). Open University.
- Himmelweit, Susan F; De Henau, Jerome (October 2007). Number 66 – Struggle over the pie? The gendered distribution of power and subjective financial well-being within UK households (PDF). Open University.
- Himmelweit, Susan F; Trigg, Andrew B; Bertie, Andrew J (January 2008). Number 68 – Modelling Bourdieu: an extension of the Axelrod cultural diffusion model (PDF). Open University. See also Pierre Bourdieu and Robert Axelrod.
- Himmelweit, Susan F; Land, Hilary (August 2010). Number 74 – Change, choice and cash in social care policies: some lessons from comparing childcare and elder care (PDF). Open University.

== See also ==
- Feminist economics
- List of feminist economists

Non-profit organisation positions
Preceded by Cecilia Conrad	President of the International Association for Feminist Economics; 2009–2009	Succeeded by Eudine Barriteau
