= Cyr Plantation, Maine =

Cyr Plantation, Maine Plantation Cyr
- Plantation
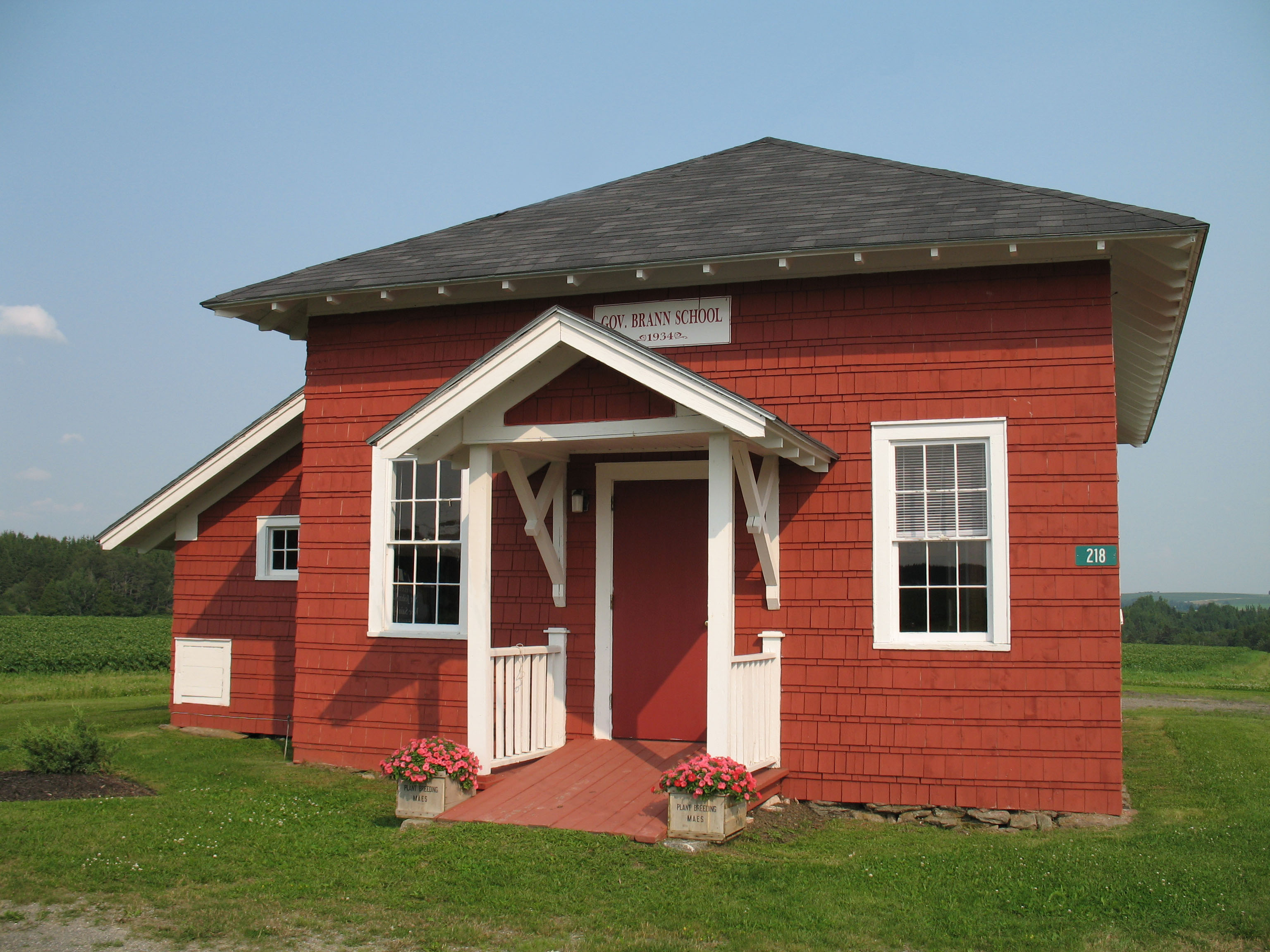
- The Governor Brann School, one of the plantation's former rural schoolhouses

- Location of Cyr Plantation, Maine
- Coordinates: 47°06′25″N 67°59′40″W
- Country: United States
- State: Maine
- County: Aroostook
- Organized: 1870

Area
  - Total: 38.3 sq mi (99.3 km^{2})
  - Land: 38.3 sq mi (99.3 km^{2})
  - Water: 0 sq mi (0 km^{2})
- Elevation: 889 ft (271 m)

Population (2020)
  - Total: 78
  - Density: 2.0/sq mi (0.79/km^{2})
- Time zone: UTC-5 (Eastern (EST))
  - Summer (DST): UTC-4 (EDT)
- Zip code: 04785
- Area code: 207
- FIPS code: 23-15990
- GNIS feature ID: 582430
- Website: cyrplantationmaine.org

Cyr Plantation (French: Plantation Cyr) is a plantation in Aroostook County, Maine, United States. The population was 78 at the 2020 census.

== History ==
Early settlers moved to what would become Cyr Plantation in the mid-1800s, then known as Township Letter L. Around that time, a road was built between the Aroostook River and Grand Falls, New Brunswick, Canada (which today stretches between Caribou, Maine, and Hamlin, Maine). Many early inhabitants obtained grants to lots near the road and Hammond Brook to farm the land. The plantation was formally organized on March 12, 1870, and named after the many Cyrs in the area, including Andre Cyr and his father Christoper, the first Cyrs in Cyr Plantation.

== Geography ==
According to the United States Census Bureau, the plantation has a total area of 99.3 square kilometres (38.3 sq mi), all land.

== Demographics ==
Languages (2000)	Percent
Spoke French at home	58.33%
Spoke English at home	41.67%

Historical population
Census	Pop.	Note	%±
1870	376		—
1880	558		48.4%
1890	429		−23.1%
1900	502		17.0%
1910	531		5.8%
1920	479		−9.8%
1930	521		8.8%
1940	433		−16.9%
1950	256		−40.9%
1960	233		−9.0%
1970	155		−33.5%
1980	147		−5.2%
1990	142		−3.4%
2000	117		−17.6%
2010	103		−12.0%
2020	78		−24.3%
U.S. Decennial Census

At the 2000 census, there were 117 people in 42 households, including 33 families, on the plantation. The population density was 3.0 people per square mile (1.2/km^{2}). There were 51 housing units at an average density of 1.3 per square mile (0.5/km^{2}). The racial makeup of the plantation was 94.02% white, and 5.98% from two or more races. Of the 42 households, 45.2% had children under the age of 18 living with them, 71.4% were married couples living together, 2.4% had a female householder with no husband present, and 21.4% were non-families. 16.7% of households were one person, and 9.5% were one person 65 or older. The average household size was 2.79, and the average family size was 3.15.

The age distribution was 30.8% under the age of 18, 4.3% from 18 to 24, 29.9% from 25 to 44, 24.8% from 45 to 64, and 10.3% 65 or older. The median age was 40 years. For every 100 females, there were 88.7 males. For every 100 females age 18 and over, there were 107.7 males.

The median household income was $32,500 and the median family income was $31,429. Males had a median income of $23,333 versus $21,563 for females. The per capita income for the plantation was $10,836. There were 12.5% of families and 9.9% of the population living below the poverty line, including 5.0% of under eighteens and none of those over 64.
