= Brandt =

Brandt may refer to:

== Places ==
=== United States ===
- Brandt, Ohio, an unincorporated community
- Brandt, South Dakota, a town
- Brandt Township, Polk County, Minnesota

=== Elsewhere ===
- Mount Brandt, Queen Maud Land, Antarctica
- Brandt Cove, South Georgia Island, Atlantic Ocean
- 3503 Brandt, an asteroid

== Other uses ==
- Brandt (name)
- Brandt (company), a German rusk and chocolate manufacturer
- Brandt (brand), a French brandname producing various home equipment
- Brandt House (disambiguation), several houses on the US National Register of Historic Places
- Brandt Centre, an arena in Regina, Saskatchewan, Canada

== See also ==
- Brand (disambiguation)
- Brant (disambiguation)
- Ernie Brandts (born 1956), Dutch former footballer
- Brandts Museum of Photographic Art, Odense, Denmark
