= Brandt House =

Brandt House may refer to:

- Brandt House (Lafayette, Louisiana), listed on the National Register of Historic Places in Lafayette Parish, Louisiana
- Dr. Albert M. and Evelyn M. Brandt House, Bismarck, North Dakota, listed on the National Register of Historic Places in Burleigh County, North Dakota
- Brandt House (Watertown, Wisconsin), listed on the National Register of Historic Places in Jefferson County, Wisconsin

== See also ==
- Brandt Hotel, Alma, Kansas, listed on the National Register of Historic Places in Wabaunsee County, Kansas
