= Randy Albelda =

American economist

Randy Pearl Albelda (born 1955) is an American feminist economist, activist, author, and academic who specialises in poverty and gender issues.

== Education and career ==
Albelda attended Smith College, where she received a B.A. in economics in 1977, followed by a Ph.D. in Economics from the University of Massachusetts Amherst in 1983. Her first publication was a study of the determinants of women's wages during the Progressive era.

In 2021, Albelda became professor emerita of economics at the University of Massachusetts Boston. She has worked as research director of the Massachusetts State Senate's Taxation Committee and the legislature's Special Commission on Tax Reform. She has served on the editorial board of the journal Feminist Economics, as an editorial associate for Dollars & Sense magazine, and was a co-founder of Academics Working Group on Poverty in Massachusetts in 1995, remaining until 1999.

== Awards ==
- Abigail Adams Award, Massachusetts Women's Political Caucus, 2000
- Chancellor's Distinguished Scholar Award, University of Massachusetts Boston, 2004

== Representative publications ==
Her works include:

- Mink Coats Don’t Trickle Down: The Economic Attack on Women and People of Color (1987; co-authored with Elaine McCrate, Edwin Melendez, and June Lapidus)
- Glass Ceilings and Bottomless Pits (1997; co-authored with Chris Tilly)
- Economics and Feminism: Disturbances in the Field (1997)
- Dilemmas of Lone Motherhood: Essay from Feminist Economics (2005; co-authored with Susan Himmelweit and Jane Humphries). This book was previously published as a special issue of the journal Feminist Economics.

== Bibliography ==
- Albelda, Randy Pearl (1988). Mink coats don't trickle down : the economic attack on women and people of color. Boston, MA: South End Press. ISBN 9780896083288. OCLC 918376711.
- Albelda, Randy Pearl; Tilly, Chris (1997). Glass ceilings and bottomless pits : women's work, women's poverty. Boston, MA: South End Press. ISBN 9780896085664. OCLC 605023572.
- Albelda, Randy Pearl (1997). Economics and Feminism: Disturbances in the Field. Impact of feminism on the arts & sciences. New York, NY: Twayne Publishers. ISBN 9780805797596. OCLC 652472647.

== See also ==
- Feminist economics
- List of feminist economists
