= Joan Busfield =

British sociologist

- Born: 22 June 1940 (age 86)
- Education: University of Essex
- Known for: Research into psychiatry and mental disorder
- Scientific career
- Fields: Sociologist
- Workplaces: University of Essex
- Doctoral students: Diana Gittins
- Website: www.essex.ac.uk/sociology/staff/profile.aspx?id=123

Joan Busfield (born 22 June 1940), is a British sociologist and psychologist, Professor of Sociology at the University of Essex and former President of the British Sociological Association (2003–2005). Her research focuses on psychiatry and mental disorder.

== Education ==
She originally trained as a clinical psychologist at the Tavistock Clinic, and holds an MA from St Andrews, and a MA and a PhD from Essex.

== Selected bibliography ==
- Busfield, Joan; Paddon, Michael (1977). Thinking about children: sociology and fertility in post-war England. Cambridge England New York: Cambridge University Press. ISBN 9780521214025.
- Busfield, Joan (1989). Managing madness: changing ideas and practice. London: Unwin Hyman. ISBN 9780044453802.
- Busfield, Joan (1996). Men, women, and madness: understanding gender and mental disorder. Washington Square, New York: New York University Press. ISBN 9780333463703.
- Busfield, Joan; Lyon, E. Stina (1996). Methodological imaginations. Houndmills, Basingstoke, Hampshire: MacMillan. ISBN 9780333630921.
- Busfield, Joan (2000). Health and health care in modern Britain. Oxford New York: Oxford University Press. ISBN 9780198781233.
- Busfield, Joan (2011). Mental illness. Cambridge, UK Malden, Massachusetts: Polity Press. ISBN 9780745649054.

=== Journal articles ===
- Busfield, J., (2017). The concept of medicalisation reassessed: a rejoinder. Sociology of Health and Illness. 39 (5), 781–783
- Busfield, J., (2017). The Concept of Medicalisation Reassessed. Sociology of Health and Illness. 39 (5), 759–774
- Busfield, J., (2015). Assessing the overuse of medicines. Social Science & Medicine. 131, 199–206
- Busfield, J., (2012). Challenging claims that mental illness has been increasing and mental well-being declining.. Social Science & Medicine. 75 (3), 581–8
- Busfield, J., (2010). ?A pill for every ill?: Explaining the expansion in medicine use. Social Science & Medicine. 70 (6), 934–941
- Busfield, J., (2007). Sociological Understandings of the Pharmaceutical Industry: A Response to John Abraham. Sociology. 41 (4), 737-739
- Busfield, J., (2006). Pills, Power, People: Sociological Understandings of the Pharmaceutical Industry. Sociology. 40 (2), 297–314
- Busfield, J., (2004). Mental health problems, psychotropic drug technologies and risk. Health, Risk & Society. 6 (4), 361–375
- Busfield, J., (2004). Class and gender in twentieth-century British psychiatry: shell-shock and psychopathic disorder.. Clio medica (Amsterdam, Netherlands). 73, 295–322
- Busfield, J., (2003). Globalization and the Pharmaceutical Industry Revisited. International Journal of Health Services. 33 (3), 581–605
- Busfield, J., (2000). Introduction: Rethinking the sociology of mental health. Sociology of Health & Illness. 22 (5), 543–558
- Busfied, J., (1999). Mental Health Policy: making gender and ethnicity visible. Policy & Politics. 27 (1), 57–73
- Busfield, J., (1998). Restructuring mental health services in twentieth century Britain.. Clio medica (Amsterdam, Netherlands). 49, 9-28
- Busfield, J., (1995). Medicine and the Five Senses (Book).. Sociology of Health and Illness. 17 (1), 123–124
- Busfield, J., (1994). The Female Malady? Men, Women and Madness in Nineteenth Century Britain. Sociology. 28 (1), 259–277
- Busfield, J., (1992). Feminism and Psychoanalytic Theory (Book).. Sociology of Health and Illness. 14 (4), 539–540
- Busfield, J., (1991). Governing the Soul: The shaping of the private self (Book).. Sociology of Health and Illness. 13 (2), 276–278
- Busfield, J., (1991). Mind, Stress and Health (Book).. Sociology of Health and Illness. 13 (1), 118–119
- Busfield, J., (1990). Sectoral Divisions in Consumption: The Case of Medical Care. Sociology. 24 (1), 77–96
- Busfield, J., (1989). Sexism and Psychiatry. Sociology. 23 (3), 343–364
- Busfield, J., (1988). Mental illness as social product or social construct: a contradiction in feminists’ arguments?. Sociology of Health & Illness. 10 (4), 521–542
- Busfield, J., (1987). The Cultural Meeting of Popular Science: Phrenology and the organization of consent in nineteenth-century Britain (Book).. Sociology of Health and Illness. 9 (2), 215–217
- Busfield, J., (1983). Madmen and the Bourgeoisie: A Social History of Insanity and Psychiatry/Madhouses, Mad-Doctors and Madmen: The Social History of Psychiatry in the Victorian Era (Book).. Sociology of Health and Illness. 5 (1), 107–108
- Busfield, J., (1982). Gender and Mental Illness. International Journal of Mental Health. 11 (1–2), 46–66
- Busfield, J., (1980). The Dignity of Labour? A study of childbearing and induction. Sociology. 14 (1), 157–159
- Busfield, J., (1977). Anthony Clare, Psychiatry in Dissent; Controversial Issues in Thought and Practice. London. Sociology. 11 (3), 563–564
- Busfield, J., (1972). Age at marriage and family size: social causation and social selection hypotheses. Journal of Biosocial Science. 4 (01), 117–134
- Busfield, J. and Hawthorn, G., (1971). Some social determinants of recent trends in British fertility. Journal of Biosocial Science. 3 (S3), 65–77
- Busfield, J. and Hawthorn, G., (1971). Some social determinants of recent trends in British fertility.. Journal of biosocial science. Supplement (3), 65–77
- Busfield, J., (1969). College Women and Fertility Values. Sociology. 3 (3), 449-449

Academic offices
Preceded by John Scott	President of the British Sociological Association; 2003–2005	Succeeded by Geoff Payne
