= School branding =

Term, mark or insignia for a school

A school brand is any type of term, mark or insignia, which distinguishes one school from another.

== History ==
While branding dates to 1100 BCE in the Vedic Period, school branding is a relatively new concept. Many universities and colleges operate in a business-like market where students are considered as customers and other schools are treated as competition. To compete, schools develop and market a brand that differentiates it from other schools vying for students and funding.

School branding surfaced in the early 1800s when a few sororities and fraternities literally branded their pledges. Schools began widely adopting branding in the early 2000s. There was a rise of for-profit and online universities, which were aggressively marketing in corporate style. At the same time, schools had to compete harder for government funding and private endowments.

== Present situation ==
In today's world, school branding plays a crucial role in identifying a school’s unique competitive advantage. Schools may use brand archetypes to craft emotional messages. For example, a school that places a high value on community service might use the archetype of the caregiver to shape its brand narrative.

A notable case of rebranding occurred when Beaver College in Pennsylvania surveyed prospective students and discovered that 30 percent of people chose not to apply because of its name. As a result, Beaver College was rebranded as Arcadia University in 2001.

== Recognition of need ==
Harvard University relies on branding to attract students and donors. The university holds trademarks to protect taglines such as "Ask what you can do" and "Lessons learned". It has also licensed its name to an upscale clothing line.

Although colleges may be fairly new to branding, they represent the longest-lived brands in the United States. Schools have existed for decades or centuries and have thousands of rivals. As baby boomers age out of the education market, the declining number of prospective students has intensified competition among schools; prompting schools to employ branding techniques to compete.

According to Neuromarketing, Columbia branded itself as the only Ivy League school in New York City and began showcasing the Manhattan experience in its marketing. Student applications have since increased, and many applicants cited location as the reason they chose Columbia University.

Likewise, high school students build a personal brand for themselves in an effort to impress colleges.

== Repercussions of improper use ==
While many school administrators recognize the power of school branding, the lack of resources and funding have led to alternative solutions to professional branding. Logo infringement has increased through the years as a result of this acknowledged need for branding. Numerous schools across the United States are infringing upon trademarked logos without realizing they are in violation. The Sanford Herald notated a recent case with Lake Mary High School in Florida, which was given a cease and desist order to terminate the use of their ram logo because it was too similar the Dodge Ram logo.

In addition to logo infringement, the loss of brand identity is another resulting drawback to improper school branding. Unprofessionally designed logos or mascots can lead to an undesired identity or a variety of versions, which can lead to brand confusion.

== Elements ==
Showing the branding element of an interlocking logo: Colony High School Interlocking logo.

- School name: The full or partial name that the school is best known as.
- Mascot or logo: The visual representation of the school that identifies the school brand.
- School colors: Colors selected by the school as a form of recognition.
- Motto, catchphrase or tagline: Bishop Montgomery High School, uses their motto "Seek Justice, Speak Truth, Serve with Honor". The branding slogan is typically used within the school to summarize the organization's character.
- Interlock or interlocking logo: Characterized by interlocking two or more letters to form an alternative logo or secondary mark.
