= Branns Hamlet =

Coordinates: 17°06′N 61°50′W

- Village
- Location within Antigua and Barbuda
- Country: Antigua and Barbuda
- Island: Antigua
- Civil parish: Saint John

Government
  - Type: Village Council (possibly dissolved)

Population (2011)
  - Total: 689
- Time zone: UTC-4 (AST)

Branns Hamlet is a village in Saint John Parish, Antigua and Barbuda.

== Demographics ==
Branns Hamlet has two enumeration districts.

- 34800 Branns Hamlet-North
- 34900 Branns Hamlet-South

=== Census data (2011) ===
==== Individual ====
Q48 Ethnic	Counts	%
African descendent	636	92.31%
East Indian/India	1	0.16%
Mixed (Black/White)	2	0.32%
Mixed (Other)	10	1.44%
Hispanic	13	1.92%
Other	13	1.92%
Don't know/Not stated	13	1.92%
Total	689	100.00%

Q49 Religion	Counts	%
Adventist	81	11.87%
Anglican	113	16.59%
Baptist	22	3.25%
Church of God	72	10.57%
Evangelical	11	1.63%
Jehovah Witness	10	1.46%
Methodist	30	4.39%
Moravian	53	7.80%
Nazarene	12	1.79%
None/no religion	14	2.11%
Pentecostal	107	15.77%
Rastafarian	14	2.11%
Roman Catholic	52	7.64%
Weslyan Holiness	17	2.44%
Other	46	6.83%
Don't know/Not stated	25	3.74%
Total	679	100.00%
NotApp :	10	

Q58. Country of birth	Counts	%
Africa	1	0.16%
Other Latin or North American countries	1	0.16%
Antigua and Barbuda	443	64.26%
Other Caribbean countries	7	0.96%
Canada	1	0.16%
Dominica	34	4.97%
Dominican Republic	18	2.56%
Guyana	63	9.13%
Jamaica	75	10.90%
Monsterrat	7	0.96%
St. Kitts and Nevis	3	0.48%
St. Lucia	7	0.96%
St. Vincent and the Grenadines	6	0.80%
Trinidad and Tobago	1	0.16%
United Kingdom	1	0.16%
USA	14	2.08%
USVI United States Virgin Islands	7	0.96%
Not Stated	1	0.16%
Total	689	100.00%

Q61 Lived Overseas	Counts	%
Yes	42	9.50%
No	399	90.25%
Don't know/Not stated	1	0.25%
Total	442	100.00%
NotApp :	247	

Q55 Internet Use	Counts	%
Yes	236	34.29%
No	447	64.90%
Don't know/Not stated	6	0.80%
Total	689	100.00%

Q71 Country of Citizenship 1	Counts	%
Antigua and Barbuda	558	80.93%
Other Caribbean countries	2	0.32%
Canada	1	0.16%
Other Asian and Middle Eastern countries	1	0.16%
Dominica	21	3.04%
Dominican Republic	7	0.96%
Guyana	36	5.29%
Jamaica	52	7.53%
St. Lucia	6	0.80%
St. Vincent and the Grenadines	1	0.16%
USA	2	0.32%
Other countries	1	0.16%
Not Stated	1	0.16%
Total	689	100.00%

Q71 Country of Citizenship 2	Counts	%
Other Caribbean countries	7	5.13%
Canada	1	0.85%
Other Asian and Middle Eastern countries	1	0.85%
Dominica	15	11.97%
Dominican Republic	9	6.84%
Guyana	28	21.37%
Jamaica	23	17.95%
Monsterrat	4	3.42%
St. Lucia	1	0.85%
St. Vincent and the Grenadines	4	3.42%
Trinidad and Tobago	1	0.85%
United Kingdom	6	4.27%
USA	28	21.37%
Other countries	1	0.85%
Total	129	100.00%
NotApp :	560	

==== Household ====
Q2 Main Material of outer walls	Counts	%
Concrete	16	6.93%
Concrete/ Blocks	16	6.93%
Wood	156	67.53%
Wood and brick	2	0.87%
Wood and concrete	39	16.88%
Wood and galvanized	1	0.43%
Other (inc. improvised, stone, stone and brick)	1	0.43%
Total	231	100.00%

Q3 Main roofing material	Counts	%
Sheet metal	212	91.77%
Shingle (asphalt)	17	7.36%
Shingle (Other)	1	0.43%
Other (inc. improvised, tarpaulin, tile)	1	0.43%
Total	231	100.00%

Q5 Type of dwelling	Counts	%
Separate house	217	93.94%
Part of a private house	2	0.87%
Double house/duplex	2	0.87%
Do not know/Not stated	10	4.33%
Total	231	100.00%

Q4 Year built	Counts	%
Before 1980	34	14.72%
1980–1989	27	11.69%
1990–1999	57	24.68%
2000–2006	35	15.15%
Year 2007	3	1.30%
Year 2008	4	1.73%
Year 2009	3	1.30%
Year 2010	3	1.30%
Don't Know/not stated	65	28.14%
Total	231	100.00%

Q6 Type of ownership	Counts	%
Owned with mortgage	17	7.36%
Owned outright	126	54.55%
Rented Private	78	33.77%
Other (inc. leased, rented Gov., squatted)	8	3.46%
Do not know/Not stated	2	0.87%
Total	231	100.00%

Q7 Land tenure	Counts	%
Leasehold	4	1.73%
Owned/Freehold	120	51.95%
Rented	85	36.80%
Rented free	7	3.03%
Other (inc. permission to work land, sharecropping, squatted)	6	2.60%
Don't know/not stated	9	3.90%
Total	231	100.00%

Q12 Main source of water	Counts	%
Private, piped into dwelling	8	3.46%
Public standpipe	41	17.75%
Public piped into dwelling	133	57.58%
Public piped into dwelling	33	14.29%
Cistern/tank	13	5.63%
Other (inc. private not into dwelling, well/tank, spring/river)	3	1.30%
Total	231	100.00%

Q11 Garbage disposal	Counts	%
Garbage truck Private	5	2.16%
Garbage truck Public	225	97.40%
Other (inc. burning, burying, compost, dumping)	1	0.43%
Total	231	100.00%

Q23 3a Desktop Computer	Counts	%
Yes	59	25.54%
No	172	74.46%
Total	231	100.00%

Q23 3b Laptop Computer	Counts	%
Yes	37	16.02%
No	194	83.98%
Total	231	100.00%

Q23 9 Mobile Device	Counts	%
Yes	195	84.42%
No	36	15.58%
Total	231	100.00%

Q23 10 Radio	Counts	%
Yes	166	71.86%
No	65	28.14%
Total	231	100.00%

Q24 Motor Vehicles	Counts	%
0	118	54.38%
1	72	33.18%
2	17	7.83%
3	6	2.76%
4 or more	4	1.84%
Total	217	100.00%
Missing :	14	

Q25 4 Internet access	Counts	%
No	185	80.09%
Yes	28	12.12%
Don't know/not declared	18	7.79%
Total	231	100.00%

Q27 Crime Reported	Counts	%
Yes	20	76.92%
No	6	23.08%
Total	26	100.00%
NotApp :	205	
