= Brann Department Stores =

Swiss department store chain

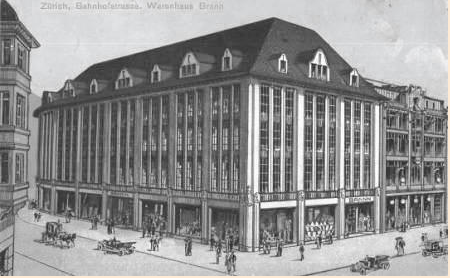
Brann department store in Zürich, building part 1912, later extended

Warenhaus Brann was a department store chain based in Switzerland, founded by Julius Brann, whose assets are currently owned by Swiss Life.

== Early years ==
Julius Brann, a twenty-year-old former manager of a Zürich branch of the Knopf department stores, founded a department store there in 1896. In 1897 he opened a branch in Basel and in 1899 another in St. Gallen. Julius married Frida Brann (died 1966)

In 1900, the Zürich department store Brann moved to a new building on Bahnhofstrasse, designed by architect Richard Kuder. In 1908, the company was converted from a limited partnership into a stock corporation. In 1910–1912, the Zürich department store expanded into a new building designed by Pfleghard and Haefeli. New branches were added and by the 1930s Julius Brann AG had become the largest Swiss retail company with around 2200 employees.

== Transfer to Oscar Weber ==
In 1939, Oscar Weber took over the company and renamed it Oscar Weber AG in 1941. Between 1956 and 1966, additional stores were opened in German-speaking Switzerland. By the mid-1970s, the group owned twelve Weber department stores and several subsidiaries operating under other names, such as the "Regina" department store in Dietikon. Together with Neue Warenhaus AG (operating under EPA in German-speaking Switzerland and UNIP in French-speaking Switzerland), Oscar Weber AG was united under the umbrella of the Zürich-based Oscar Weber Holding (OWH).

At the beginning of the 1980s, the Oscar Weber department stores disappeared from the townscape, mostly due to their conversion into EPA department stores. A different solution was found for the Brann building in 1983: the building was renovated and leased for 30 years to Maus Frères Holding, which opened Vilan, the first Manor department store in Zürich, in 1984.

The department store was therefore spared the subsequent turbulence of OWH for a long time: the owner families Buhofer, Weber and Stöckli split up the holding company anew in 1995: Neue Warenhaus AG became the owner of the EPA properties, while EPA's department store business was spun off again into EPA AG, which was now formally only the tenant of the properties. All properties not occupied by EPA were combined in Oscar Weber AG. Due to close ties with Schweizerische Rentenanstalt, OWH was sold in mid-2001 to Rentenanstalt, which retained the real estate divisions, while the Buhofer family took over EPA's department store business, which it intended to continue under its own management.

On 1 February 2002 Coop acquired 40% of the share capital of EPA AG and announced in the fall that it intended to reorganize the EPA department stores with the Coop department stores (St. Annahof) to form uniform Coop City department stores. At the beginning of 2004, Coop also took over the remaining 60% of EPA's share capital and in mid-2004 informed about further closures of former EPA department stores.

== Transfer to Swiss Life ==
The sale of the Weber properties to today's Swiss Life also caught up with the Brann House in 2014. At the end of September 2019, Manor announced that it would be moving from its headquarters on Bahnhofstrasse due to a lack of agreement with the landlord.
