= Swan Larson Three-Decker =

- U.S. National Register of Historic Places
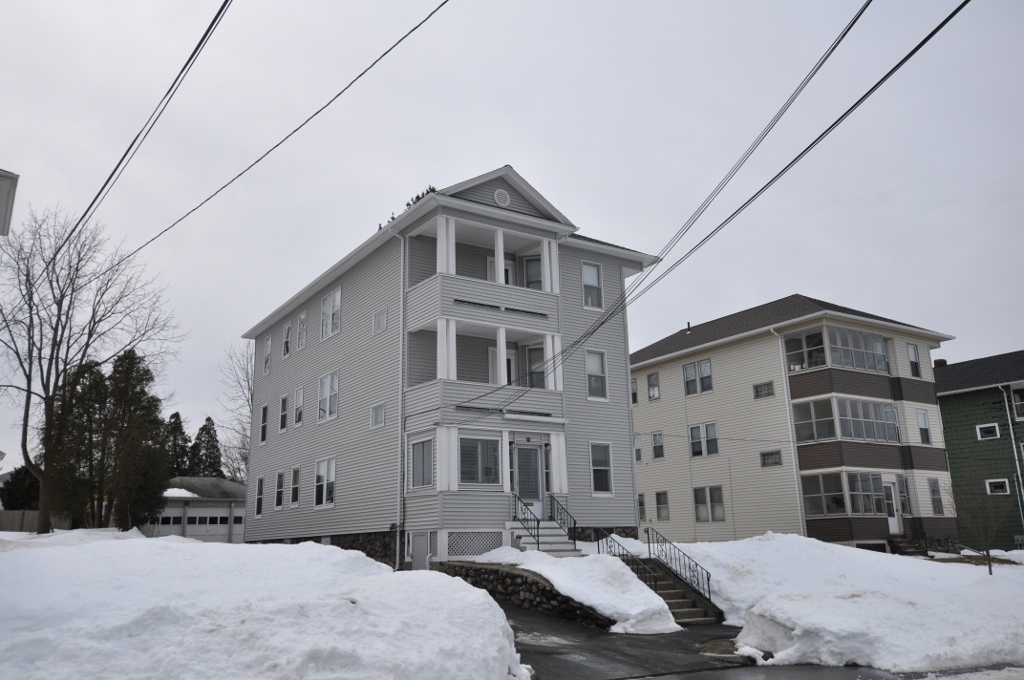

- Location within Massachusetts Location within the United States
- Location: 12 Summerhill Ave., Worcester, Massachusetts
- Coordinates: 42°18′20″N 71°47′56″W
- Area: less than one acre
- Built: 1918
- Architect: Swan Larson
- Architectural style: Colonial Revival
- MPS: Worcester Three-Deckers TR
- NRHP reference No.: 89002443
- Added to NRHP: February 9, 1990

The Swan Larson Three-Decker is a historic triple decker house in Worcester, Massachusetts. The house was built c. 1918 and is a well-preserved local example of Colonial Revival styling. It was listed on the National Register of Historic Places in 1990.

== Description and history ==
The Swan Larson Three-Decker is located in Worcester's northern Greendale area, on the south side of Summerhill Avenue east of Massachusetts Route 12. It is a three-story wood-frame structure, covered by a hip roof and finished in wooden clapboards. Its front facade is asymmetrical, with a stack of porches on the left and a wide polygonal window bay on the right. The porches are supported by clustered columns, and topped by a fully pedimented gable with oriel window. The ground floor porch has been enclosed in glass. On the right side of the building, a square window bay projects, topped by a pedimented gable. The building historically had bands of trim and wooden shingles between the floors; these have been removed.

The house was built about 1918, when the Greendale area was being developed as a streetcar suburb for workers at the city's northern factories. Its first owner, Swan Larson, was a carpenter who lived at 6 Summerhill Avenue, and owned several other triple deckers in the area. Early residents included workers at the Norton Company and a bank teller.

== See also ==
- National Register of Historic Places listings in eastern Worcester, Massachusetts
