= Van den Brande =

Van den Brande is a surname, used primarily in Belgium. Notable people with the surname include:

- Alfons Van den Brande (1928–2016), Belgian racing cyclist
- Luc Van den Brande (born 1945), Flemish politician, minister-president of Flanders (1992–1999)

== See also ==
- Jacoba van den Brande (1735–1794), a Dutch culture personality
