= August Cornelius Larson House =

Historic house in Wisconsin, United States

- U.S. National Register of Historic Places
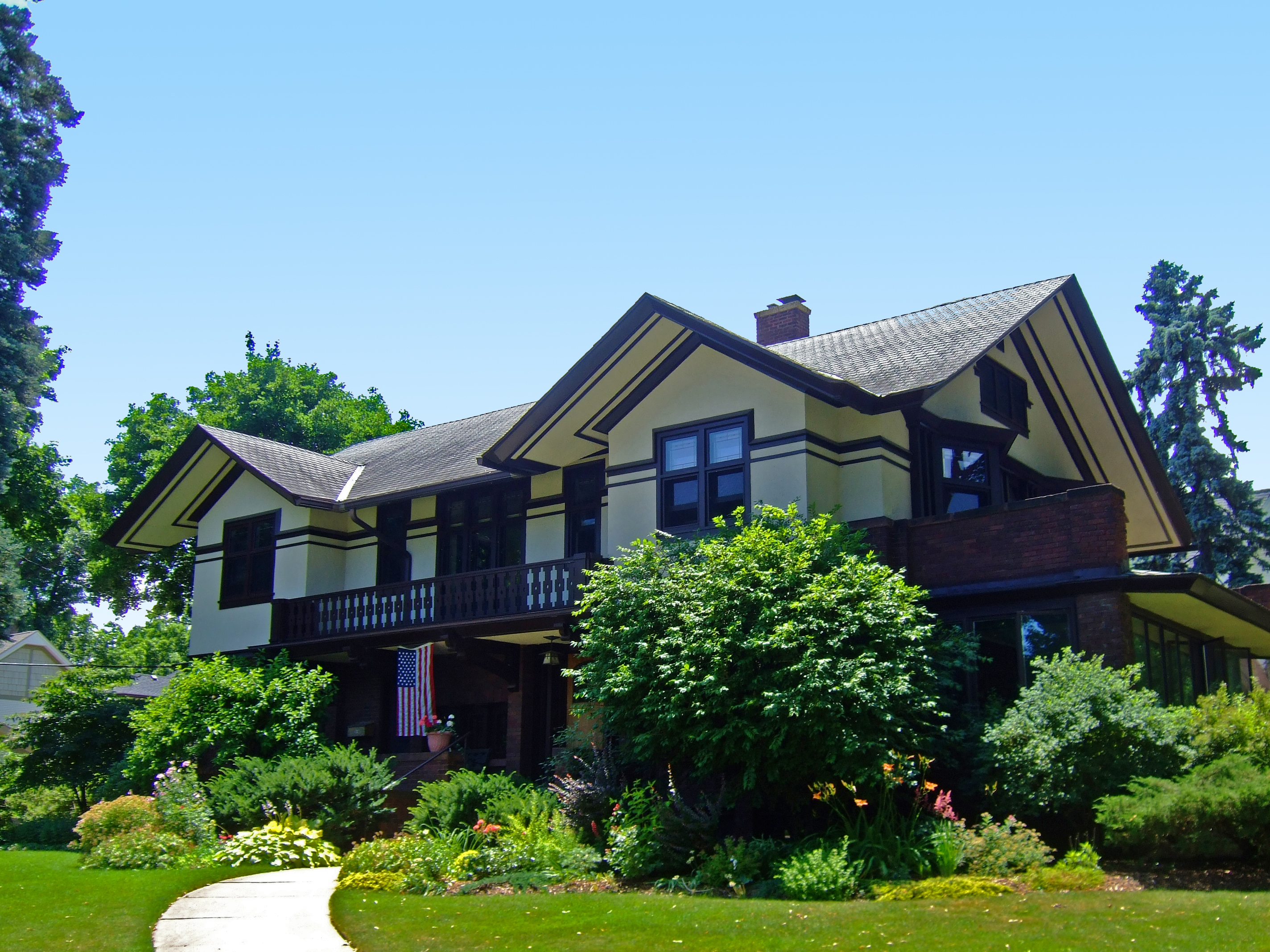
- August Cornelius Larson House
- Location: 1006 Grant St., Madison, Wisconsin
- Coordinates: 43°03′49″N 89°24′53″W
- Area: less than one acre
- Built: 1911
- Architect: Claude and Starck
- Architectural style: Prairie School
- NRHP reference No.: 94000451
- Added to NRHP: May 19, 1994

The August Cornelius Larson House is a Prairie Style house built in 1911 two miles southwest of the capitol in Madison, Wisconsin. In 1994 the house was added to the National Register of Historic Places as one of Madison's finest Prairie Style houses.

August Larson was born in 1875 on a farm in Wiota, fifty miles southwest of Madison. After finishing a B.A. in classics at Coe College in Cedar Rapids in 1903, he became Wisconsin manager for Central Life Assurance. Success there led him to be the secretary of the National Association of Life Underwriters. In 1911 August and his wife Ella had this house built.

The house has two stories, with the first clad in brick and the second in stucco. It is a textbook example of Prairie Style, with the broad eaves, balcony, and string courses emphasizing the horizontal, with the grouped windows, with geometric designs in leaded glass in many of the windows. Two window groups on the second floor are arranged as unusual triangular bays. The balusters of the balcony rail are boards with a diamond cut-out. The main front door is golden oak with a leaded glass window, flanked by sidelights. Inside is a central foyer with quarter-sawn oak trim and a staircase to the second floor with newel posts and the diamond shape repeated. The first floor contains the living room with a tiled, oak-mantled fireplace, the dining room with its own fireplace, built-in china cabinets, and a plate rail on the wall. The first floor also contains a study, sun room, kitchen, bathroom, and guest bedroom. Upstairs are three bedrooms and an apartment.

The house is generally credited to Louis Claude and Edward Starck because of many similarities to other houses they designed at the time, but no proof remains. (The dark red brick appears to be identical to that of their Collins house on Gorham.)

August served as a director of Commercial Trust Company and later President of Randall Bank. He served on the state board of the YMCA. The Larsons lived in the house until 1940.

Joseph Endres bought the house after the Larsons and rented it out. At some point it was remodeled into apartments, splitting the central foyer so that half of it held a kitchen. By 1991 the inside had been remodeled into four apartments. Then new owners converted the house back to a residence with one apartment.
