= Brown University Graduate School =

Coordinates: 41.826037°N 71.403860°W

- Type: Graduate school
- Parent institution: Brown University
- Location: Providence, Rhode Island, USA
- Campus: Urban
- Website: graduateschool.brown.edu

The Brown University Graduate School is the graduate school of Brown University in Providence, Rhode Island. The school offers 51 doctoral programs and 33 master's programs.

== History ==
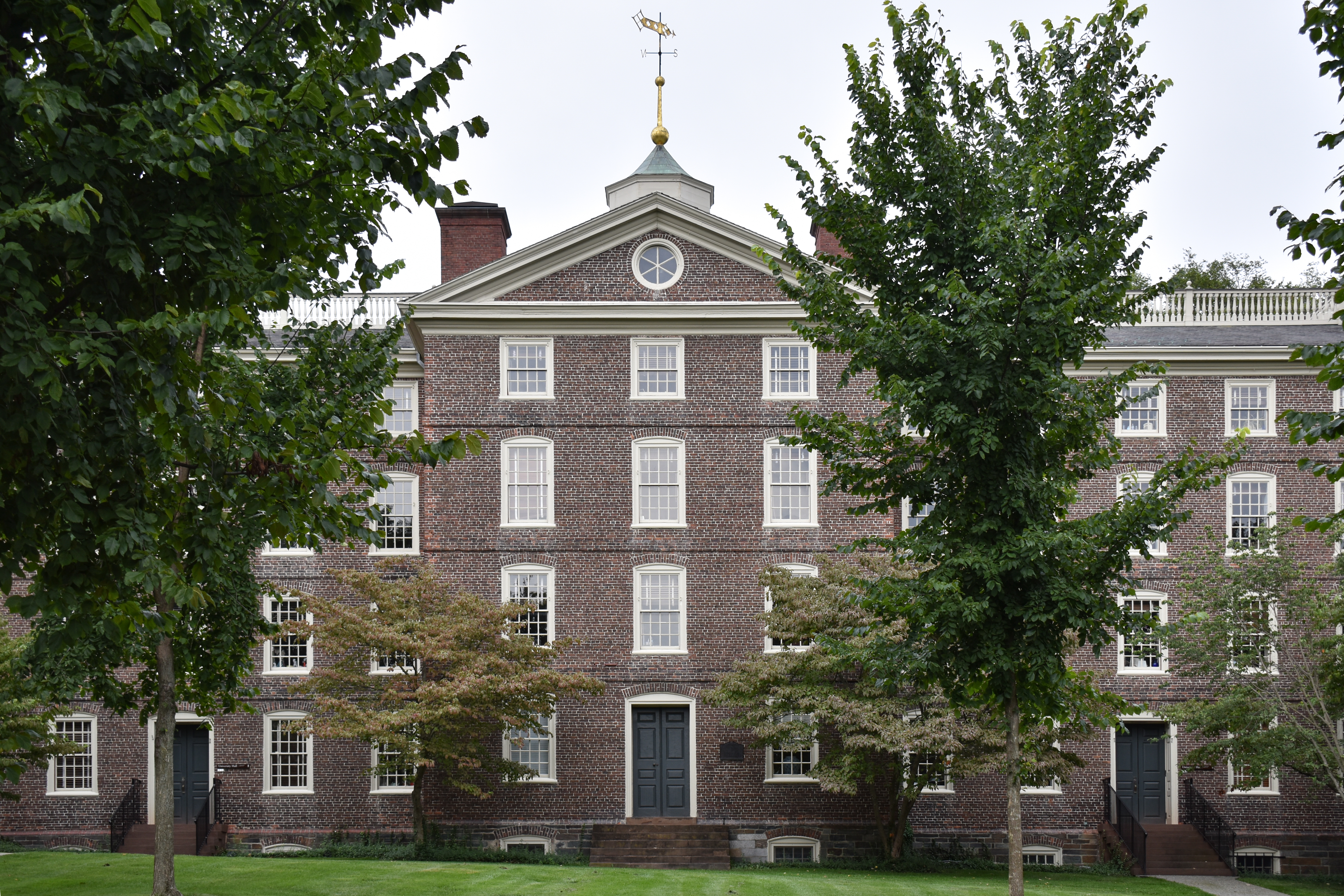
University Hall at Brown University

While originally established in 1850 under university president Francis Wayland, graduate study at Brown ceased after seven years of operation. In 1887, the Graduate School was re-established; the first master's degrees were awarded in 1888, and the first Ph.D's in 1889.
