= Brand (literary magazine) =

Brand (stylized BRAND) was a British literary magazine that published short stories, plays, poems and non-fiction. The magazine was first published in 2007. Each issue featured an interview with a writer and art by contemporary artists. It folded in 2012.

== Key staff ==
Playwright and short story writer Nina Rapi was the founding editor of Brand.

== Notable events ==
The magazine premiered a new Howard Barker play at The Purcell Rooms as part of the London Literature festival 2010. Brand also presented Brand shorts at the Royal Festival Hall, South Bank, London Literature Festival 2009; and organized events at the Rich Mix Centre, The Langly, Borders and Foyles bookstores. Brand participated in panel discussions and/or offered masterclasses at The Newsroom, The Guardian, Westminster reference library and Foyles.
