= Words Beats & Life =

Hip-hop nonprofit in Washington, D.C.

Words Beats & Life inc. is a Washington DC–based hip-hop non-profit working to "transform individual lives and whole communities through elements of hip-hop culture." Founded as a hip-hop conference in 2000 at the University of Maryland, College Park, Words Beats & Life separated from the University to become a separate organization in 2002, officially incorporated as a 501(c)(3) in 2003. Words Beats & Life works with the community by teaching, convening, and presenting hip-hop through the Urban Arts Academy, the Cipher, and publication of the first peer-reviewed academic journal of global hip-hop culture.

== Words Beats & Life Academy ==
According to The Washington Post, the Words Beats & Life Academy “aims to transcend the familiar beats and rhymes and use hip-hop as a catalyst to change lives.” Starting as a Saturday program, the Academy grew into an afterschool and summer program that serves 150 students during the year and up to 300 during the summer. Classes are taught by practicing artists, who serve as mentors for their students. Youth, ages 5–23, participate in pre-vocational arts programming to hone skills in graffiti and visual arts, B-boying, DJing, and emceeing. In addition to skill mastery, the urban arts academy focuses on self-awareness and employability, using hip-hop as a platform to engage students in learning, building community, and thinking about their futures. For example, emceeing helps students sharpen public speaking skills, and DJing connects students to technology and engineering. Visual arts skills are used to paint murals and Words Beats & Life has worked in conjunction with the DC Government on the Murals DC project, which aims to redirect the energy of graffiti artist to legal projects to beautify the city.

== Words Beats and Life Experiences ==
Scratch, Sip & Paint

Graffiti

DJing

Hip-Hop Tea Party

Walking Mural Tour

Bike Mural Tour

Concrete and Roses

Chocolate Milk and Butter Crunch

== Creative Economy Career Pipeline ==
Creative Economy Career Fair(s)

Summer Youth Employment Program

Alternative Spring Break

Like a Boss

The League

== The Cipher ==
The Cipher is a national network, connecting institutions, organizations, and individual artists and scholars using hip-hop as a medium to promote social change. Traditionally, hip-hop organizations are often absent from conferences and symposia in their respective fields, and therefore working in isolation. Through publication of a peer-reviewed academic journal and an annual Teach-in, Words Beats & Life works to bring together scholars, educators, artists, and activists who use hip-hop as a tool for social change in a discussion of how to work together as a community and maximize the collective capacity to make change.

== The Journal ==
Words. Beats. Life: The Global Journal of Hip-Hop Culture is the first academic peer-reviewed journal of hip-hop studies, also showcasing the talents visual artists and poets in the field. Combining art and scholarly work intends to present a dialogue between different mediums. Featuring established intellectuals and artists in the field as well as previously unknown individuals, the journal is a resource for hip-hop scholars and non-profits, representing current developments in the field. The Journal is published twice a year with the goal to promote dialogue and interaction between artists and scholars within the DMV.

Vol 1 Issue 1: Inaugural Issue

Vol 1 Issue 2: The Art of the Name Drop

Vol 1 Issue 3: Where My Girls At?

Vol 1 Issue 4: Poetry, Hip-Hop, and Global Revolutions

Vol 2 Issue 1: Golden Era of Hip Hop

Vol 2 Issue 2: One Day it Will All Make Sense

Vol 3 Issue 1: The Blueprint for a Movement

Vol 3 Issue 2: Bootleg This Journal

Vol 4 Issue 1: It Ain't My Fault

Vol 4 Issue 2: The Sex Issue

Vol 5 Issue 1: I Am

Vol 5 Issue 2: Untitled

Vol 6 Issue 1: Who We Are

Vol 6 Issue 2: Brazil

Vol 7 Issue 1: Spaces and Places

Vol 7 Issue 2: Street Lit

Vol 8 Issue 1: South Africa

== WPFW 89.3FM ==
Live @ 5

Words Beats & Life Radio

The 5th Element

== Published Poets ==
Malachi Byrd

Kenneth Carroll III

== Fine Lines: Mural Program ==
Baltimore

U Street

== Signature Events ==
DC Youth Poet Laureate

Words Beats and Life Festival

Chinatown Block Party

The Fresh Ball

Juste Debout

La Belle Hip-Hop

Bum Rush the Boards is an annual hip-hop chess tournament created in 2005 as a more inclusive alternative to traditional chess tournaments. Named after Public Enemy's 1987 album Yo! Bum Rush the Show, the tournament aims to connect the hip-hop generation to chess as a model of “overcoming through strategic struggle.” In addition to chess matches cultivating strategic thinking, the event includes workshops about the elements of hip-hop culture and how they related to STEM fields.

Remixing the Art of Social Change is an annual teach-in hosted at Howard University since 2007, bringing together organizations, artists, and scholars that use hip-hop culture to promote social change. Through roundtables, panel discussions, film screenings, and workshops that build on the efforts of the previous teach-ins, the event showcases work being done and creates a network for individuals and organizations to connect and advance how hip-hop is used as a medium to promote positive change.

The Freshest of all Time is DC's largest B-boy/B-girl jam featuring prominent b-boy crews from DC, Maryland, Virginia, Philadelphia, Boston, and New York. The battle drew more than 600 people in 2009, and 800 in 2010.
