= Esther Brann =

American writer and illustrator (1899–1998)

- Born: July 21, 1899; New York, New York
- Died: January 3, 1998 (aged 98); Ventura, California
- Known for: Illustration
- Spouse: Richard Schorr

Esther Brann (July 21, 1899 – January 3, 1998) was an American children's writer of children's literature and illustrator.

== Education ==
Brann was born in New York City. She attended the Art Students League of New York, Cooper Union, the National Academy of Design, and the Fontainebleau School of Fine Arts in France.

== Career ==
After finishing her education in France, Brann returned to New York looking for work as an illustrator. When she could not find work, she decided to work for herself and began writing and illustrating her own books.

Brann was named one of ten national award winners for her children's books.

== Personal life ==
Brann traveled around the world with her husband and son when her husband was enlisted in the Navy. They lived in Guam, Florida, Virginia and California. These travels influenced her writing and illustrations.

== Death ==
Esther Brann Schorr died on January 3, 1998, in Ventura, California.

== Works (written and illustrated) ==
- Nanette of the Wooden Shoes (1922)
- A Quebec Sketchbook (1926)
- Lupe Goes to School (1930)
- Nicolina (1931)
- Yann and His Island (1932)
- Bobbie and Donnie Were Twins (1933)
- Around the World With Esther Brann (1935)
- Another New Year With Bobbie and Donnie (1936)
- Patrick Was His Name (1938)
- Patrick Goes A-Hunting (1940),
- Five Puppies for Sale (1948)
- Book for Baby

== Works (illustrated) ==
- Edna Albert's Little Pilgrim to Penn's Woods
- Edna Albert's The Shawl with the Yellow Bells
- Mary Jane Carr's Children of the Covered Wagon
