= Brant =

Brant may refer to:

== Places ==
- Brant County, Ontario, Canada
  - Brant (electoral district), Ontario, Canada
  - Brant North, Ontario, Canada
  - Brant South, Ontario, Canada
  - Brant South (provincial electoral district), Ontario, Canada
  - Brant—Wentworth, Ontario, Canada
  - Brantford, Ontario, Canada
- Brantville, New Brunswick, Canada
- Brant, Alberta, Canada
- Brant Broughton, a village in Lincolnshire, England
  - River Brant, Lincolnshire, after which the village was named.
- Brant Fell, a hill in the Lake District, North West England
- Brant Island, Massachusetts, United States
- Brant Township, Michigan, United States
- Brant, New York, United States
- Brant Lake, New York, United States
- Brant, Wisconsin, United States

== People ==
- Brant (surname), people with the surname Brant
- Brant Alyea, American former professional baseball outfielder
- Brant Bjork, American musician
- Brant Boyer, American former football linebacker
- Brant Brown, American hitting coach
- Brant Chambers, Australian rules footballer
- Brant Colledge, Australian rules footballer
- Brant Daugherty, American actor
- Brant Garvey, Australian paratriathlete
- Brant Hansen, American radio show host and author
- Brant Kuithe, American football tight end
- Brant Little, Canadian middle-distance runner
- Brant Miller, American meteorologist
- Brant Parker, American cartoonist
- Brant Pinvidic, Canadian film director
- Brant J. Pitre, American theologian
- Brant Rosen, American rabbi and blogger
- Brant Ust, Belgian former professional baseball player
- Brant Weidner, American former professional basketball player
- Brant Woodward, New Zealand sport shooter

== Ships ==
- CCGS Brant, a Canadian Coast Guard navigation aids vessel
- USFS Brant, a United States Bureau of Fisheries fishery patrol vessel in commission from 1926 to 1940 which then served in the Fish and Wildlife Service fleet as US FWS Brant from 1940 to 1953
- USS Brant, more than one United States Navy ship

== Other uses ==
- Brant (goose) (Branta bernicla), a species of goose (also known as the Brent goose)
- Brant's Volunteers, an irregular corps raised in 1777 during the American Revolutionary War by Joseph Brant
- Black Brant (rocket), a Canadian-designed sounding rocket

== See also ==
- Brandt (disambiguation)
