= Governor Brann School =

Historic school building on US Route 1

- U.S. National Register of Historic Places
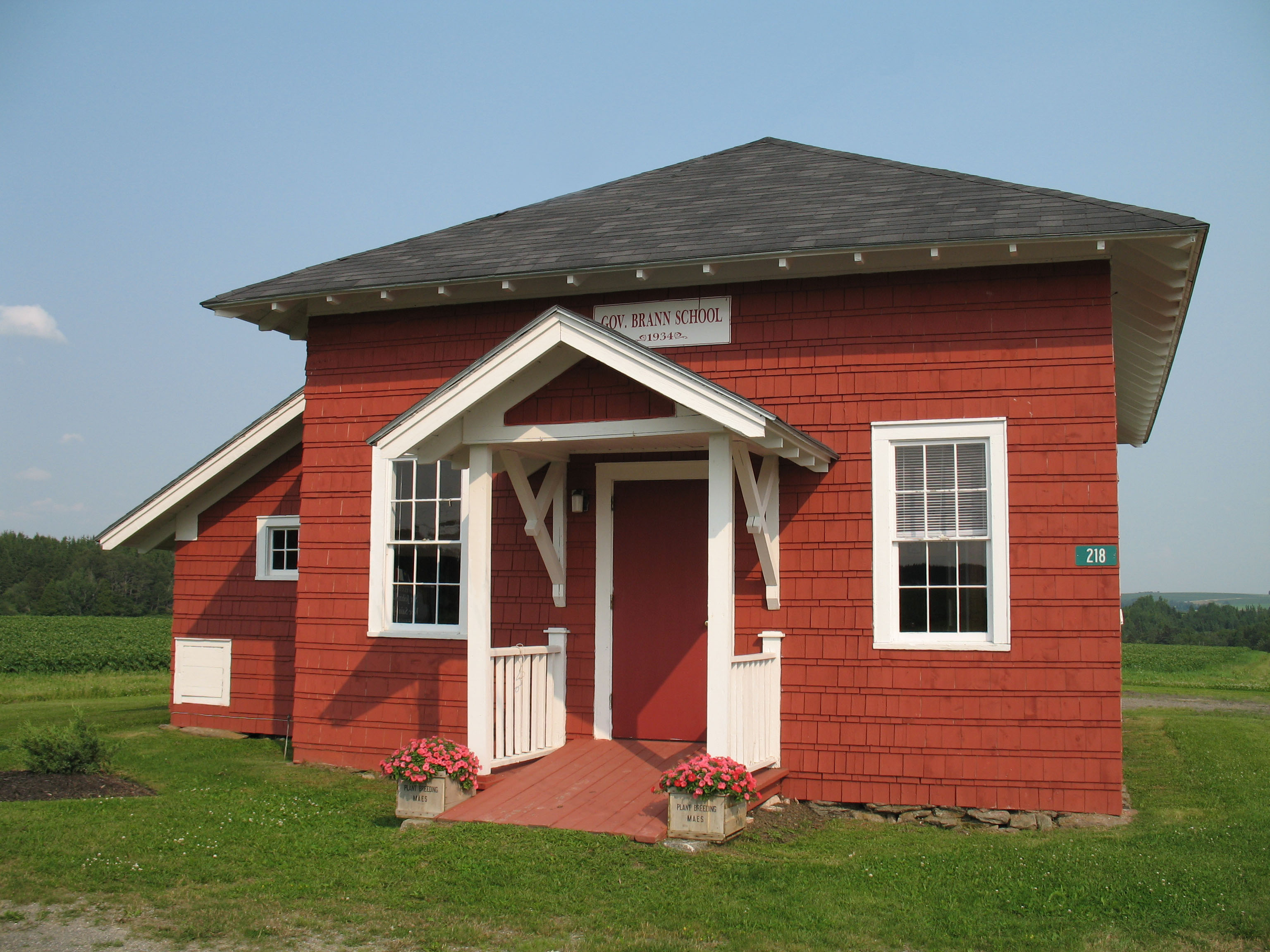

- Location within Maine Location within the United States
- Location: US Route 1, Cyr Plantation, Maine
- Coordinates: 47°7′18″N 67°57′42″W
- Area: less than one acre
- Built: 1934
- Architectural style: Bungalow/craftsman
- NRHP reference No.: 93001432
- Added to NRHP: December 23, 1993

The Governor Brann School is a historic school building on United States Route 1 in Cyr Plantation, Maine. It presently is used by the plantation as a polling station and meeting place. The school was named for Louis J. Brann, who was Governor of Maine at the time of its construction in 1934. It is the best-preserved of the community's former district school buildings; it was listed on the National Register of Historic Places in 1993.

== Description and history ==
The Brann School is set on the east side of United States Route 1, just south of its junction with Laplante Road. It is a small wood-frame structure with Craftsman styling. It is finished in wood shingles and has a hip roof. A shed-roof addition extends from the center of the northern facade. The main facade faces west, and is three bays wide, a pair of sash windows flanking the center entrance. The entrance is sheltered by a gable-roofed portico, supported by both large brackets and a pair of square posts. The porch roof, like that of the building, has exposed rafter ends in the Craftsman style. The interior of the main block is a single room, with small closets on either side of the entrance, and doorways leading the northern addition, which originally housed pit toilets. The interior is finished in tongue-and-groove woodwork with a chair rail.

Cyr Plantation was incorporated in 1870. The Governor Brann School, built in 1934, was the third built by the community for its third district. Due to declining population and school enrollment, the community closed three of its six schools in 1943, and the rest were closed in 1950, when its schools were consolidated with those of neighboring Van Buren. The design of this school was based on one of a series of plans developed by the Portland architectural firm Miller & Mayo pursuant to a state contract for designing model schools under a 1909 state law intended to improve the state's rural schools. This school building is one of a number of rural schools in the state built according to the same design.

== See also ==
- National Register of Historic Places listings in Aroostook County, Maine
