= USS Brant =

USS Brant may refer to more than one United States Navy ship:

- USS Brant (AM-24), a minesweeper in commission from 1918 to 1945
- USS Brant (AMS-43), a minesweeper launched as YMS-113 and in commission from 1942 to 1946

== See also ==
- USFS Brant, a United States Bureau of Fisheries fishery patrol vessel in service from 1926 to 1940 which then served in the Fish and Wildlife Service fleet as US FWS Brant from 1940 to 1953
