= Bill Brand =

Bill Brand may refer to:

- Bill Brand (TV series), a British television drama series produced in 1976
- Bill Brand (film artist) (born 1949), experimental film and video artist

== See also ==
- Bill Brandt (1904–1983), British photographer and photojournalist
