= Brann Boardinghouse =

Historic place in Tonopah, Nevada, US

- U.S. National Register of Historic Places
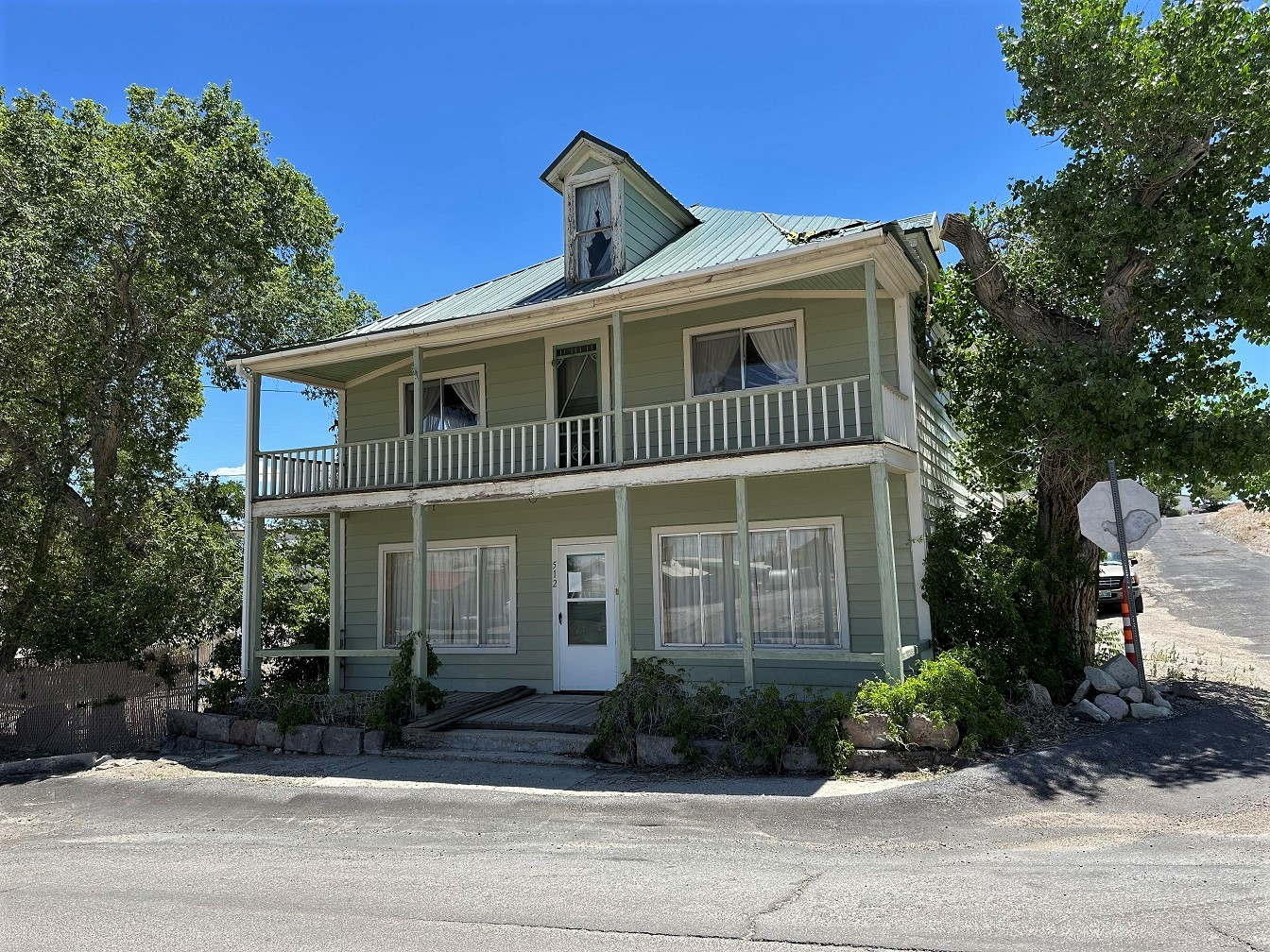
- Brann Boardinghouse in 2024

- Location within Nevada Location within the United States
- Location: Bryan St. Tonopah, Nevada
- Coordinates: 38.06573°N 117.23168°W
- Area: less than one acre
- Built: 1906
- MPS: Tonopah MRA
- NRHP reference No.: 82003220
- Added to NRHP: May 20, 1982

The Brann Boardinghouse is a historic boarding house located on Bryan Street in Tonopah, Nevada. The 2 1/2-story building is the largest wood-frame residence in Tonopah. The building's design includes a two-story porch with a balustrade along the second floor, molded cornices, boxed eaves, and a hipped roof; the inside has 18 rooms connected by two central hallways, one on each floor. Mrs. A.J. Brann built the boarding house in 1906. It was one of many boarding houses built in Tonopah to house the community's miners. The house is now one of only four boarding houses remaining in Tonopah.

The boarding house was added to the National Register of Historic Places on May 20, 1982.
