= Palimpsest (journal) =

Academic journal centering women of the African diaspora

- Discipline: Africana studies, Women studies
- Language: English
- Edited by: Tracy Denean Sharpley-Whiting, Tiffany Ruby Patterson-Myers

Publication details
- History: 2012–present
- Publisher: State University of New York Press (United States)
- Frequency: Biannual

Standard abbreviations
- ISO 4: Palimpsest (Albany, N.Y.)

Indexing
- ISSN: 2165-1604 (print); 2165-1612 (web)
- LCCN: 2011273640
- OCLC no.: 768836721

Links
- Journal homepage; Online access at Project MUSE

Palimpsest: A Journal on Women, Gender, and the Black International is a biannual peer-reviewed academic journal covering work by and about women of the African diaspora and their communities in the Atlantic and Indian Ocean worlds. It was established in 2012 and is published by State University of New York Press. The editors-in-chief are Tracy Denean Sharpley-Whiting and Tiffany Ruby Patterson-Myers (Vanderbilt University).

Palimpsest is listed in the Modern Language Association's International Bibliography.
