= Dr. Albert M. and Evelyn M. Brandt House =

Historic house in North Dakota, United States

- U.S. National Register of Historic Places
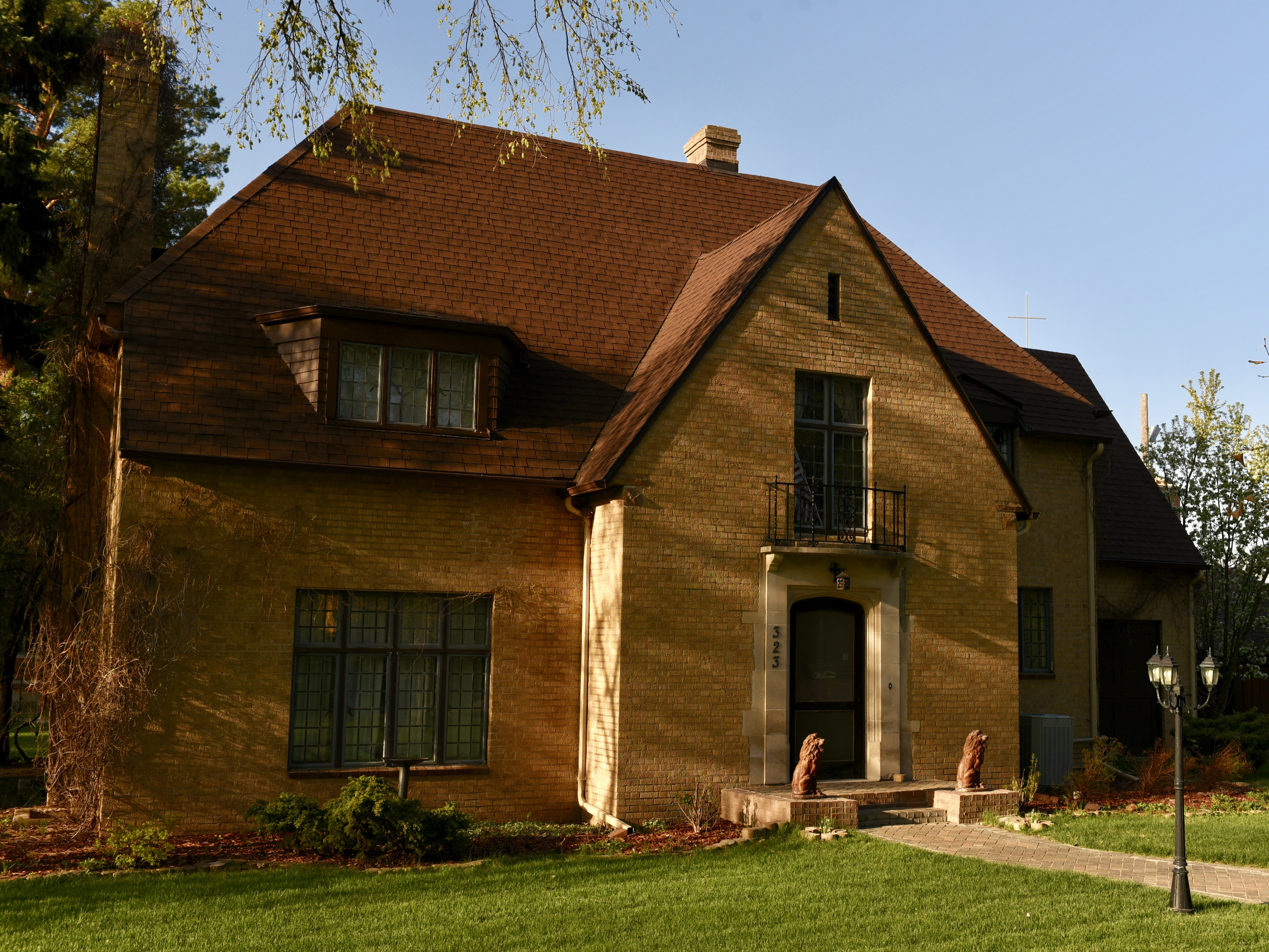

- Location within North Dakota Location within the United States
- Location: 323 E. Ave. B, Bismarck, North Dakota
- Coordinates: 46°48′1″N 100°47′9″W
- Area: less than one acre
- Built: 1928
- Built by: Nils H. Lovin
- Architect: Don A. McLaren and Albert O. Larson
- Architectural style: Tudor Revival
- NRHP reference No.: 00000992
- Added to NRHP: August 16, 2000

The Dr. Albert M. and Evelyn M. Brandt House on E. Ave. B in Bismarck, North Dakota was built in 1928. It has also been known as the Francis and Leona Larson House. It was listed on the National Register of Historic Places (NRHP) in 2000; the listing included two contributing buildings and a contributing site.

Its NRHP nomination asserted it is "one of the best examples of the Tudor Revival period (1890-1940)" in Bismarck. The house was built in 1928 for Dr. Albert M. Brandt, a prominent local pediatrician and obstetrician, and his wife Evelyn M. Brandt. In 1948 the Brandts sold the house to the Mrs. Underhill, who sold the house to Francis and Leona Larson in 1952. The Larsons owned the house the longest, from 1952 to 1997. Francis Larson (1917-1918) was a bank president and manager of the JC Penney Store in Bismarck and was active in various civic and church organizations. The Larson often hosted their neighbors, Governor Norman Brunsdale and Governor John Davis at dinner parties at the house in the 1950s.
