= Conrad Brann =

German-British linguist (1925–2014)

Conrad Max Benedict Brann (July 20, 1925, in Rostock, Germany – June 23, 2014) was a German-British linguist and professor at University of Maiduguri in Nigeria. Brann opened a personal library in his living area that influenced the lives of language/linguistics students and English students.

== Career ==
Brann's early life was spent in Germany and Italy.

Brann studied Linguistics and International Relations in Hamburg, Rome, Oxford, Paris and Bruges. He taught English Language at the University of Hamburg and was from 1958 to 1965 in the administration of UNESCO. Brann lived in Nigeria from 1966.

He is the founder and was from 1977 head of the Department of Languages and Linguistics at the University of Maiduguri.

His main work has been definition and explanation of language use in a multilingual or bilingual societies, with focus on Nigeria.

== Honors ==
- 1990: Order of Merit of the Federal Republic of Germany
- 1999: Festschrift in Honour of Conrad Max Benedict Brann, University of Maiduguri
- 2004: Member of the Order of the Federal Republic, Nigeria

== Literature ==
- William Charles McCormack, Stephen Adolphe Wurm (ed.): Language and society: anthropological issues. - Mouton, 1979
- Brann, C.M.B., "Lingua Minor, Franca & Nationalis". In: Ammon, Ulrich (ed.). Status and Function of Languages and Language Varieties. Berlin: Walter de Gruyter, 1989, pp. 372–385
- Brann, C.M.B., "Reflexions sur la langue franque (lingua franca): Origine et Actualité", La Linguistique, 30/1, 1994, pp. 149–159
- Brann, C.M.B., "The National Language Question: Concepts and Terminology." Logos [University of Namibia, Windhoek] Vol 14, 1994, pp. 125–134
