= HNoMS Brann =

Several ships of the Royal Norwegian Navy have borne the name HNoMS Brann or Brand (archaic spelling):

- HNoMS Brand (1898) was a 1.-class torpedo boat launched in 1898, captured by the Germans in 1940, returned in 1945 and scrapped in 1946.
- HNoMS Brand (1947) was a former German E-boat (ex-S-303) which was commissioned into the Royal Norwegian Navy in 1947 and decommissioned in 1951.
- HNoMS Brann (P970) was a Storm-class fast patrol boat built in 1967 and decommissioned in 1990.
