= Nina Rapi =

Greek writer

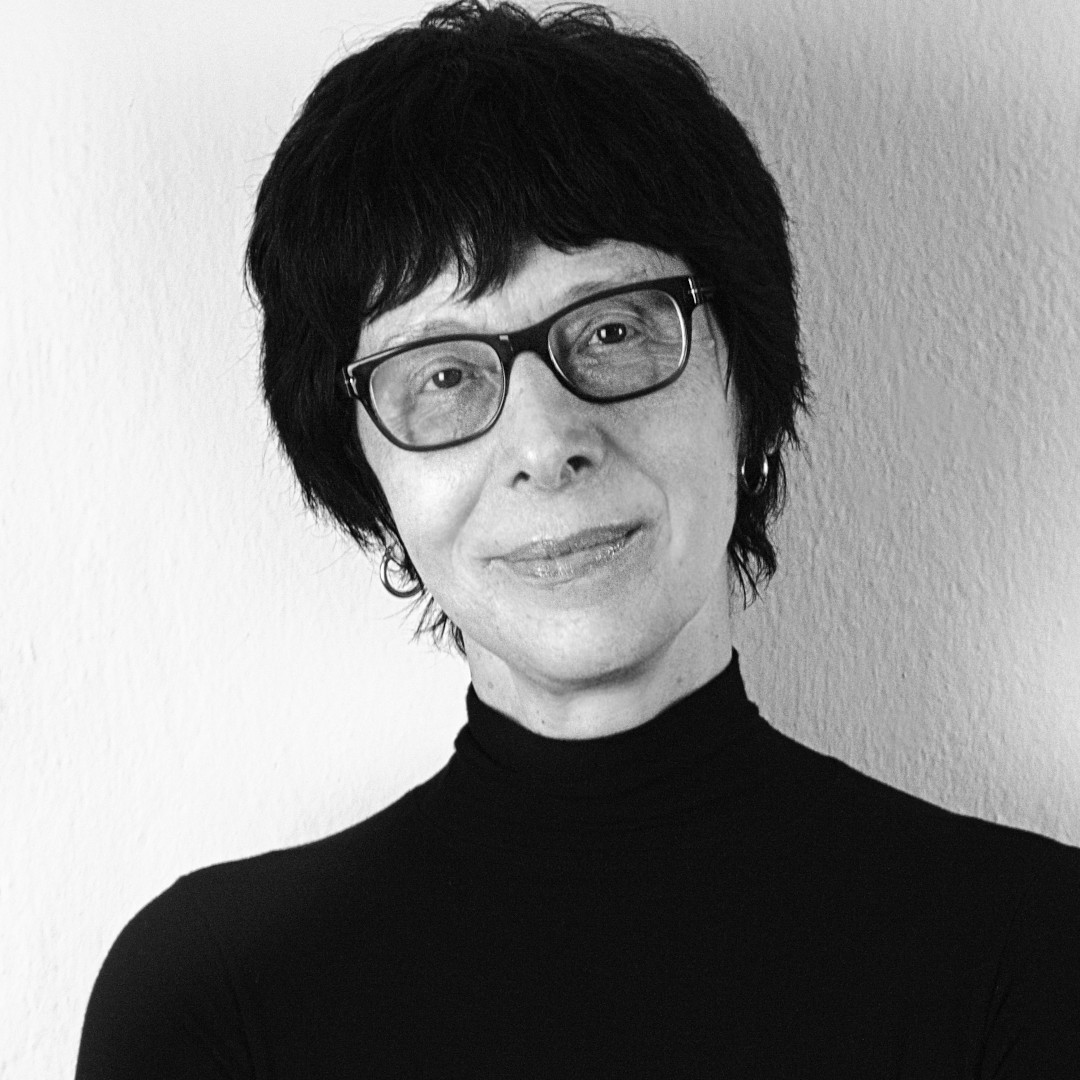
Portrait of Nina Rapi by Christos Kyriazidis

Nina Rapi (Greek: Νίνα Ράπη) is a Greek playwright. She also writes short stories and essays.

== Style and themes ==
Rapi's writing focuses on power, desire and freedom. In an interview with The Scavenger she described her core themes in her latest trilogy of plays (Angelstate; Reasons to Hide; Kiss the Shadow) as being surveillance, censorship and power on the one hand, with intimacy, resistance and freedom on the other. In a more recent interview with Samuele Grassi, and regarding her aesthetic approach, she says: 'The place from which I write is very intimate and personal but the situations/dynamics, characters and stories I create are fictional and often intellectually worked out (the mental and the emotional are for me closely inter-linked.' & 'I do often use different media on stage, not only videos but live music and choreography...Text is of course primary.' Lizbeth Goodman analysing Ithaka, Rapi's first play, writes: 'It is this concept of transformative progressive freedom that provides the key to Nina Rapi's first play Ithaka, a play that looks at the darker side of sexuality...' & 'Ithaka explores the concept that individuals are constantly subconsciously attracted to conflict and domination...Most important, Ithaka is a dark comedy – surreal in some aspects, bizarrely "realistic" in others. The tone of the piece is strikingly irreverent.' Samuele Grassi, analysing Rapi's more recent work (Angelstate, Lovers, Tricky, Josie's Restrooms) writes of 'Rapi's use of a multi-layered structure...focusing on freedom and/or desire as freedom.'

== Plays ==
Nina Rapi's first play Ithaka was initially performed as a staged reading in 1989 at Riverside Studios by the Women's Theatre Workshop. Dimple Godiwala referring to Shadow, one of the key characters in the play, wrote: 'Shadow is where we begin to recognise the depths of sexuality (and otherness) we all possess...To invite an introspection which rests on the shadowed self we need to recognise that our sexualities, however they may have been moulded, are based on a certain opacity of self.' The play went on to get published in Seven Plays by Women, Aurora Metro, winner of the Raymond Williams award, 1991; and to win Best Play Award at BITS Theatre Festival, Pirani, India, 1995.

Dreamhouse & Dance of Guns followed, both performed at Oval House Theatre at 1991 and 1992 respectively. Lovers was performed, in its short version, at Gielgud Theatre, part of West End Shorts, London New Play Festival 2002. Edgewise had a performed presentation at Gate Theatre in 2013.

In 2010, Rapi's play Kiss the Shadow had a performed presentation at Soho Theatre Studio. In the same year, extracts were performed at the Lyric Theatre Studio; and Southbank Centre as part of the London Literature Festival. Also in 2010, her play Edgewise/Ακροβασία was presented at the National Theatre of Greece, Festival Analogion.

She has since written Άγριες Νότες/Wild Beats produced at Aggelon Vima, Athens, Greece 2014 & 2015. It was published by Sokolis publishers. Her play Angelstate had a performed presentation at Theatro Technis, Athens, Greece, Festival Analogion 2015. Angelstate was also included in the Oberon Anthology of Contemporary Greek Plays, published in 2017. The same year, her play Splinters was performed at theatro Argo in Athens. In 2018, it was also produced at Theatre T in Thessaloniki & at Simpkins Lee Theatre, University of Oxford. It was published by Sokolis Publishers, Athens, Greece Also in 2018, her play Α/βεβαιότητες(Un/certainties) had a performed presentation at dithepi, Municipal Theatre of Piraeus. And her libretto Raven revisited an opera by the composer Kostis Kritsotakis was performed at Theatro Voyiatzis, Athens (in a short version it was also performed at Onassis Cultural Centre, SGT, Athens, Greece in 2014)

Nina Rapi's play Angelstate was published in three languages in Spring 2019: in Greek as a single edition, by Sokolis publishers; in Slovakian in the anthology Grecka Drama by Divadelny Ustav, Bratislava; in Italian in the anthology Viaggio Nel Teatro greco contemporaneo by ETPbooks.

== Short stories ==
- In 2014 Rapi's collection of short stories State of Fugue/Κατάσταση Φούγκας was published by Kedros Publishers, Athens, Greece.
- Playing yo-yo at Waterloo Bridge (published in Polari Journal Spring 2011, and then DEKATA, Athens Literary Magazine, Autumn 2012
- La Luna (published in 3:AM Magazine Feb. 2009),
- Scatman (published in Pulp.Net literary magazine, 2008 and then DEKATA, Athens literary magazine, 2010)
- The Moment You Slipped (published in Tell Tales Volume Three, 2006)
- Foreigner (published in Chroma literary journal, 2004)

== Works ==
=== Full-length plays ===
- What reality? (2021)
- (Un)certainties/(Α)βεβαιότητες (2018)
- Raven revisited (Libretto, 2018 & 2014)
- Splinters (2017 & 2018)
- Angelstate (2015 & 2006)
- Wild Beats/Άγριες Νότες (2014 & 2015)
- Kiss the Shadow (2010)
- Edgewise (2010 & 2003)
- Reasons to Hide (2009)
- Lovers (2001)
- Dance of Guns (1992)
- Dreamhouse (1991)
- Ithaka (1989)

=== Short plays and monologues ===
- Splinters: 7 μονόπρακτα (2017 & 2018)
- Love yeah!/Αγάπη Ρε! (2014)
- Ms Jones Matters (2010)
- Gentle Persuasion (2006)
- Tricky (2001)
- Josie's Restrooms (2000)Collis, Rose, ed. (2000). Lesbian Erotica. UK: Robinson. ISBN 1-84119-077-2.
- Dangerous Oasis (1993)
- Johnny is Dead (1990)
- Critical Moments (1990)

=== Critical writings on Rapi's works ===
- Nina Rapi: Angelstate by Amalia Kondoyianni, Diastixo.gr. 2020
- Splinters: Intimacy Bruising by Amalia Kondoyianni, 2017
- Angelstate: Docile Bodies by George Sabatakakis, 2017
- Οι Άγριες Νότες και η τελεολογία της αντίστασης by George Sabatakakis, 2014
- Queer Crossings: theories, bodies, texts, edited by Silvia Antosa, Mimesis 2012 (interview with the author and analysis by Samuele Grassi of plays Angelstate, Lovers, Tricky and Josie's Restrooms)
- Looking through Gender: Post-1980 British & Irish Drama, Samuele Grassi, Cambridge Scholars Publishing, 2011 (analysis of plays Angelstate, Lovers, Tricky and Josie's Restrooms)
- Alternatives Within The Mainstream II:Queer Theatre in Postwar Britain, 2007 Dr. Dimple Godiwala-McGowan, Cambridge Scholars Publishing (Ithaka analysed in introduction)
- Who's Who in Lesbian and Gay Writing, G. Griffin, Routledge, 2002
- Putting Your Daughters on the Stage, S. Freeman, Cassell, 1997 (features a chapter on Rapi's early plays)
- Modern Drama, L.Goodman, Modern Drama, Spring Issue 1996 (analysis of Ithaka)
- Monologue Plays for Female Voices M. Rose, Tirrenia Stampatori, Italy, 1995 (chapter on the monologue Johnny is Dead)

== Featured in ==
- Seven Plays by Women (1993)
