= Brandt (name) =

Brandt is a Germanic surname and given name.

== Geographical distribution ==
As of 2014, 42.4% of all known bearers of the surname Brandt were residents of Germany (frequency 1:1,108), 30.5% of the United States (1:6,951), 4.5% of South Africa (1:6,959), 3.7% of Brazil (1:32,483), 2.7% of Denmark (1:1,232), 2.7% of Sweden (1:2,162), 1.6% of Canada (1:13,299), 1.3% of the Netherlands (1:7,848), 1.3% of Poland (1:17,678), 1.0% of Namibia (1:1,366).

In Germany, the frequency of the surname was higher than national average (1:1,108) in the following states:

1. Mecklenburg-Vorpommern (1:348)
2. Schleswig-Holstein (1:409)
3. Saxony-Anhalt (1:460)
4. Lower Saxony (1:573)
5. Hamburg (1:599)
6. Bremen (1:623)
7. Berlin (1:754)
8. Brandenburg (1:803)
9. Thuringia (1:1,096)

In Denmark, the frequency of the surname was higher than national average (1:1,232) only in one region: Capital Region of Denmark (1:905)

In Namibia, the frequency of the surname was higher than national average (1:1,366) in the following regions:

1. ǁKaras Region (1:163)
2. Kunene Region (1:454)
3. Omaheke Region (1:700)
4. Erongo Region (1:709)
5. Khomas Region (1:899)
6. Hardap Region (1:942)

In Sweden, the frequency of the surname was higher than national average (1:2,162) in the following counties:

1. Dalarna County (1:1,266)
2. Skåne County (1:1,497)
3. Jönköping County (1:1,638)
4. Kronoberg County (1:1,876)
5. Västmanland County (1:1,995)
6. Stockholm County (1:2,139)

== People with the surname ==
=== Arts and entertainment ===
- Augusto Brandt (1892–1942), Venezuelan musician and composer
- Betsy Brandt (born 1973), American actress
- Bill Brandt (1904–1983), German-British photographer and photojournalist
- Carlos Brandt (1875–1964), Venezuelan philosopher, author and naturopath
- Di Brandt (born 1952), Canadian poet and literary critic
- Eddie Brandt (1920–2011), American composer, writer and store owner
- George Brandt (1920–2007), German film producer
- Gerard Brandt (1626–1685), Dutch preacher, playwright, poet, church historian, biographer and naval historian
- Helene Brandt (1936–2013), American sculptor
- Helmut Brandt (musician) (1931–2001), German jazz saxophonist and bandleader
- Jerry Brandt (1938–2021), American entrepreneur, impresario, agent, manager, promoter, and club owner
- Joe Brandt (1882–1939), American publicist, screenwriter, editor, film producer, and general manager
- Józef Brandt (1841–1915), Polish painter best known for his paintings of battles
- Kyle Brandt (born 1979), American actor
- Lesley-Ann Brandt (born 1981), South African actress, Mazikeen on the TV series Lucifer
- Mac Brandt, American actor
- Marianne Brandt (1893–1983), German painter, sculptor, photographer and designer
- Marianne Brandt (contralto) (1842–1921), Austrian opera singer
- Matthias Brandt (born 1961), German actor, audiobook narrator, and writer
- Max von Brandt (1835–1920), German diplomat and publicist
- Miroslav Brandt (1914–2002), Croatian historian
- Paul Brandt (pilot) (1915–1944), German fighter ace and Knight's Cross recipient
- Paul Brandt (born 1972), Canadian country music singer
- Peter Andreas Brandt (1792–1862), Norwegian painter and illustrator
- Rainer Brandt (1936–2024), German actor
- Rolf Brandt (1886–1953), German writer
- Skylar Brandt (born 1993), American ballet dancer
- Vassily Brandt (1869–1923), Russian trumpeter, composer and pedagogue

=== Science and mathematics ===
- Achi Brandt (born 1938), Israeli mathematician
- Arthur William Brandt (1888–1943), American engineer
- Brian Brandt, American electrical engineer
- Eduard Brandt (1839–1891), Russian zoologist and anatomist
- Fred Hermann Brandt (1908–1994), German insect collector, botanist, and counter-espionage agent
- Fredric Brandt (1949–2015), American dermatologist
- Heinrich Brandt (1886–1954), German mathematician
- Georg Brandt (1694–1768), Swedish chemist and mineralogist who discovered cobalt
- Johann Friedrich von Brandt (1802–1879), German naturalist
- Karl Brandt (zoologist) (1854–1931), German zoologist and marine biologist

=== Politics ===
- Andy Brandt (1938–2023), Canadian politician
- Bernard E. Brandt (1881–1954), American politician
- David Brandt (politician), former Chief Minister of Montserrat
- Edward R. Brandt (1931–2013), American politician
- Gökhan Brandt (born 1997), German politician
- Helmut Brandt (born 1950), German politician
- Helmut Brandt (1911–1998), German politician in East Germany
- Kate Brandt, first American Chief Sustainability Officer
- Michel Brandt (born 1990), German politician
- William Brandt (Nebraska politician) (1924–2000), American politician from Nebraska
- Willy Brandt (1913–1992), German politician

=== Sports ===
- David Brandt (American football) (born 1977), American football offensive lineman
- Ed Brandt (1905–1944), American baseball player
- Gil Brandt (1933–2023), American football executive
- Hannah Brandt (born 1993), American ice hockey player
- Jackie Brandt (born 1934), American baseball player
- Julian Brandt (born 1996), German footballer
- Kerstin Brandt (born 1961), East German high jumper
- Peter Brandt (1931–2022), British rower
- Viktor Brandt (born 1999), Swedish biathlete

=== Fictional characters ===
- Katie Brandt-Heppner, fictional character in Andrew Unger's novel Once Removed

=== Others ===
- Charlie Brandt (1957–2004), American serial killer
- Charles Brandt (1942–2024), American investigator and writer
- David Brandt (1946–2023), American sustainable farmer
- Edgar Brandt (1880–1960), French ironworker and weapons designer
- Francis Frederick Brandt (1819–1874), British barrister and author
- Franz Brandt (1893–1954), German World War I flying ace
- Heinz Brandt (1907–1944), German army officer and showjumper
- Jan Brandt, American entrepreneur
- Johanna Brandt (1876–1964), South African propagandist, spy, prophet and writer
- Joseph A. Brandt, American university president
- Karl Brandt (1904–1948), German Nazi physician and war criminal, executed for war crimes
- Karl Brandt (economist) (1899–1975), German-American agricultural economist
- Lawrence Eugene Brandt (1939–2025), American Roman Catholic bishop
- Realf Ottesen Brandt (1859–1927), Lutheran minister
- Reinhard Brandt (1937–2025), German philosopher
- Richard Brandt (1910–1997), American philosopher
- Rudolf Brandt (1909–1948), German Nazi SS officer, executed for war crimes
- Yakov Brandt (1869–1946), Russian Sinologist-diplomat, philologist and professor

== People with the given name ==
- Brandt Hershman, American politician
- Brandt C. Louie (born 1943), Canadian businessman
- Brandt Jobe (born 1965), American golfer
- Brandt Snedeker (born 1980), American golfer

== See also ==
- Brant (surname)
- Brand (surname)
