= Brant (surname) =

Brant is a surname. Notable people with the surname include:

- Aaron Brant (born 1984), American football player
- Alice Dayrell Caldeira Brant (1880–1970), Brazilian writer
- Antony Thomas Brant (born 1983), English pop singer
- Berle Brant (born 1989), Estonian footballer
- Beth Brant (1941–2015), Native Canadian Mohawk writer
- David Brant, NCIS investigator
- Everett H. Brant (1885–1954), American politician
- Henry Brant (1913–2008), Canadian-born composer, long-resident in the US
- Isabella Brant (1591–1626), first wife of Peter Paul Rubens
- John Brant (Mohawk chief) (1794–1832), Mohawk chief, son of Joseph
- Jon Brant (born 1955), American bass player
- Joseph Brant (c. 1743–1807), Mohawk leader
- Lauren Brant (born 1989), Australian TV personality, member of Hi-5
- Marshall Brant (born 1955), American baseball player
- Molly Brant (c. 1736–1796), Mohawk leader
- Mike Brant (1947–1975), Israeli pop star
- Monica Brant (born 1970), American bodybuilder
- Peter M. Brant (born 1947), American art collector and film producer
- Ralph Brant, Mohawk lawyer and activist
- Scott Brant (cricketer) (born 1983), Zimbabwean cricketer
- Scott Brant (speedway rider) (b. 1968), American speedway racer
- Sebastian Brant (1457–1521), German humanist and satirist
- Shawn Brant, Native Canadian Mohawk activist
- Tarso Brant (born 1993), Brazilian trans actor, and model
- Tim Brant (born 1949), American sportscaster

== Fictional characters ==
- Betty Brant, Spider-Man character

== See also ==
- Brandt (name)
