= Grape therapy =

Pseudoscientific diet based on grapes

Grape therapy or grape diet, also known as ampelotherapy, is a diet that involves heavy consumption of grapes, sometimes with their seeds, leaves and parts of the vine, as a form of alternative medicine. It emerged in German spas such as Bad Dürkheim and Merano in the 19th century. The concept has no scientific basis and is regarded as quackery by scientific institutions including the American Cancer Society.

== Background ==
An assumption of some of grape therapy is that consuming grape constituents would provide unusual therapeutic or nutritional benefits. However, consuming grapes has unknown effects against cardiovascular diseases and other diseases, such as metabolic syndrome. Alternative medicine practitioners have recommended grapes and parts of the vine for treating various diseases, but there is no clinical evidence for any such effects.

Grape pomace contains various micronutrients, but the resulting flour from pomace has variable nutrient contents due to processing, drying, and storage conditions. In a reference amount of 100 g (3.5 oz), raw grapes provide little nutritional benefit, except for moderate amounts of carbohydrates and vitamin K (see grape nutrition).

Proanthocyanidins, anthocyanins and resveratrol extracted from grape seeds and grape skins are under basic research for their possible biological effects. Pomace also contains organic acids (tartaric, malic, citric, tannic), but there is no evidence for health effects from these phytochemicals.

== History ==
The documentation of a grape diet was first seen in a publication by Dr. Veit Kaufmann, a family doctor in the viticultural city of Bad Dürkheim, Germany, called "Die Traubenkur in Dürkheim a.d. Haardt" (The Grape Treatment Course in Dürkheim on the river Haardt) (1856). Kaufmann was well known locally, and a personal friend of Rudolf Virchow, who underwent the treatment regularly.

In the USSR, the principles of a grape cure were developed in the 1920s by a group of physicians of the Semashko Institute (Yalta), headed by A.V. D'iakov. Ampelotherapy is offered in alternative medicine clinics and spas, particularly in Europe, together with vinotherapy, a cosmetic treatment that involves rubbing grapes into the skin.

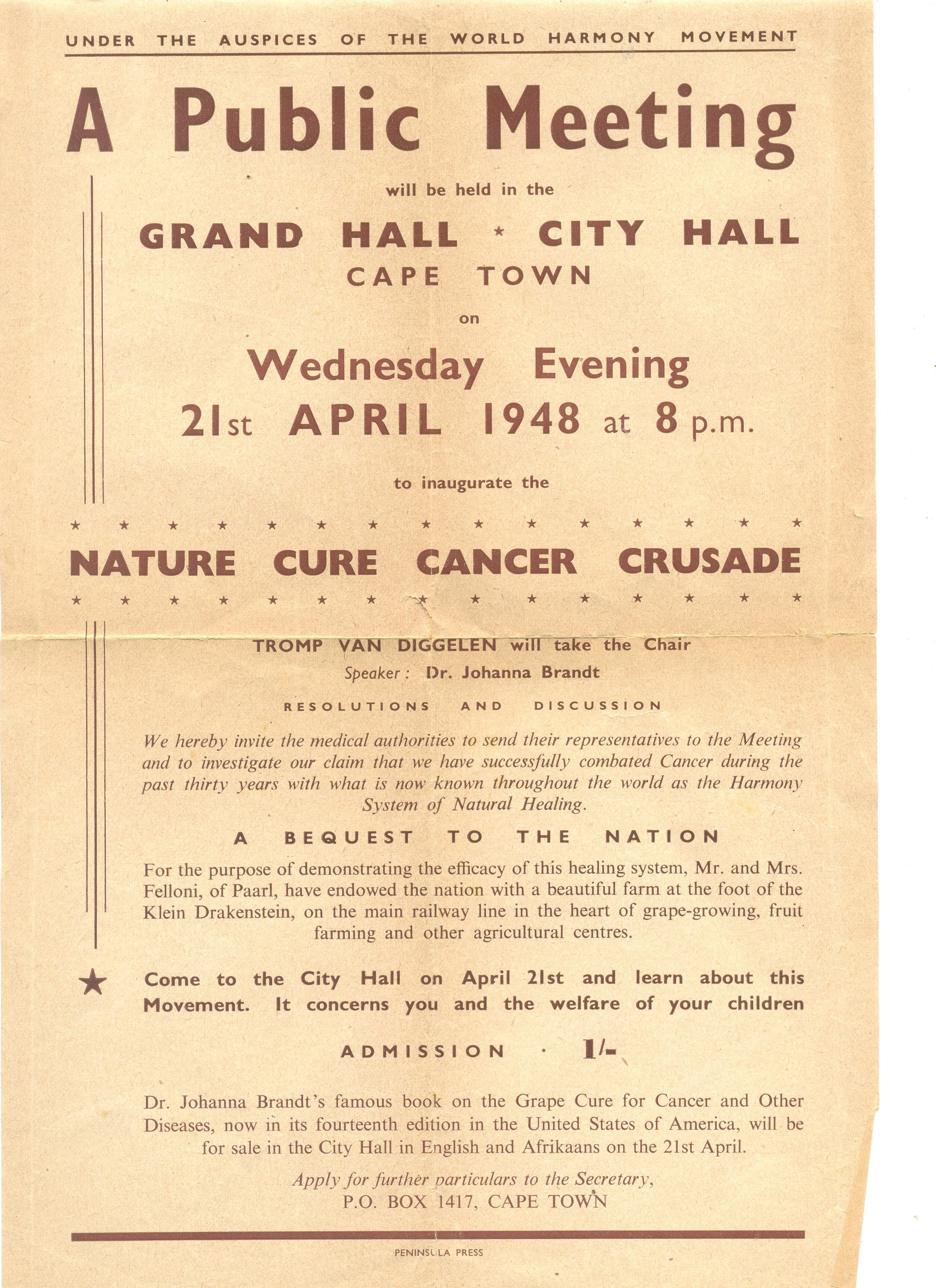
Johanna Brandt – Notice

Johanna Brandt, a South African author, popularized the grape diet as a treatment for cancer from 1925. She published about twenty pamphlets on the subject of natural remedies for health problems with her book The Grape Cure, which is said to have been written after Brandt had cured herself of stomach cancer by following the diet. The book was republished in 1989 as How to Conquer Cancer, Naturally, including an endorsement of Brandt's work by Benedict Lust, who is commonly referred to as "the father of naturopathy".

Although commonly used as a dietary supplement and studied in human trials at an amount much higher than can be consumed from drinking red wine, there is no high-quality evidence that resveratrol provides any benefits for cardiovascular risk factors. Advocates of grape therapy argue that grape phytochemicals inhibit the development of cancer, arthritis or diabetes, but there is no scientific evidence for such effects.

== Treatments ==
The diet proposed by Veit Kaufmann recommended the consumption of several pounds of freshly picked grapes a day, spread over 4 portions, combined with walks, sports and light healthy meals, over a course of three to six weeks in a spa, overseen by medical personnel. The diet proposed by Johanna Brandt recommended fasting for two or three days, consuming only cold water, followed by a diet of only grapes and water for one to two weeks, with seven meals a day. Fresh fruits, tomatoes, and sour milk or cottage cheese are then introduced to the diet followed by raw vegetables.

== Criticisms ==
Available scientific evidence does not support claims that a diet of grapes is effective for treating cancer or any other disease. The Brandt diet, in particular, has been described as "quackery" by Barrett who notes that the American Cancer Society reviewed The Grape Cure in 1965, 1971, 1974, and 2000 and found no evidence of benefit against human cancer or any other disease. Grape seed extract has been identified by the U.S. Food and Drug Administration as a "fake cancer 'cure'".

== See also ==
- Grape surgery
- Urine therapy
- Gerson therapy
- List of unproven and disproven cancer treatments
