= Grape surgery =

Use of grapes in surgical simulation

Grape surgery is the use of grapes as training models in surgical simulations. A video of the robotic da Vinci Surgical System peeling and stitching the skin of a grape, accompanied by the text "they did surgery on a grape", became an Internet meme in 2018.

== Medical applications ==
Grapes have been utilised as low-cost training models for surgical simulations, particularly in the fields of microsurgery and ophthalmology.

In ophthalmology, grapes serve as a cheaper, and more readily available, alternative to virtual reality training and physical models, such as animal eyes, artificial model eyes, or human eyes sourced from eye banks or donated cadavers. The elastic skin of a grape has similar mechanical tension to the lens capsule of the human eye and has been identified as a potentially useful model for continuous curvilinear capsulorhexis training. However, grapes cannot fully replicate the challenge of this procedure as they lack any structure analogous to the anterior chamber of the eye.

Some robot-assisted surgery systems have used grapes as training models to demonstrate the precision capabilities of the system, by performing tasks such as peeling the delicate skin and stitching it back together.

== Internet meme ==
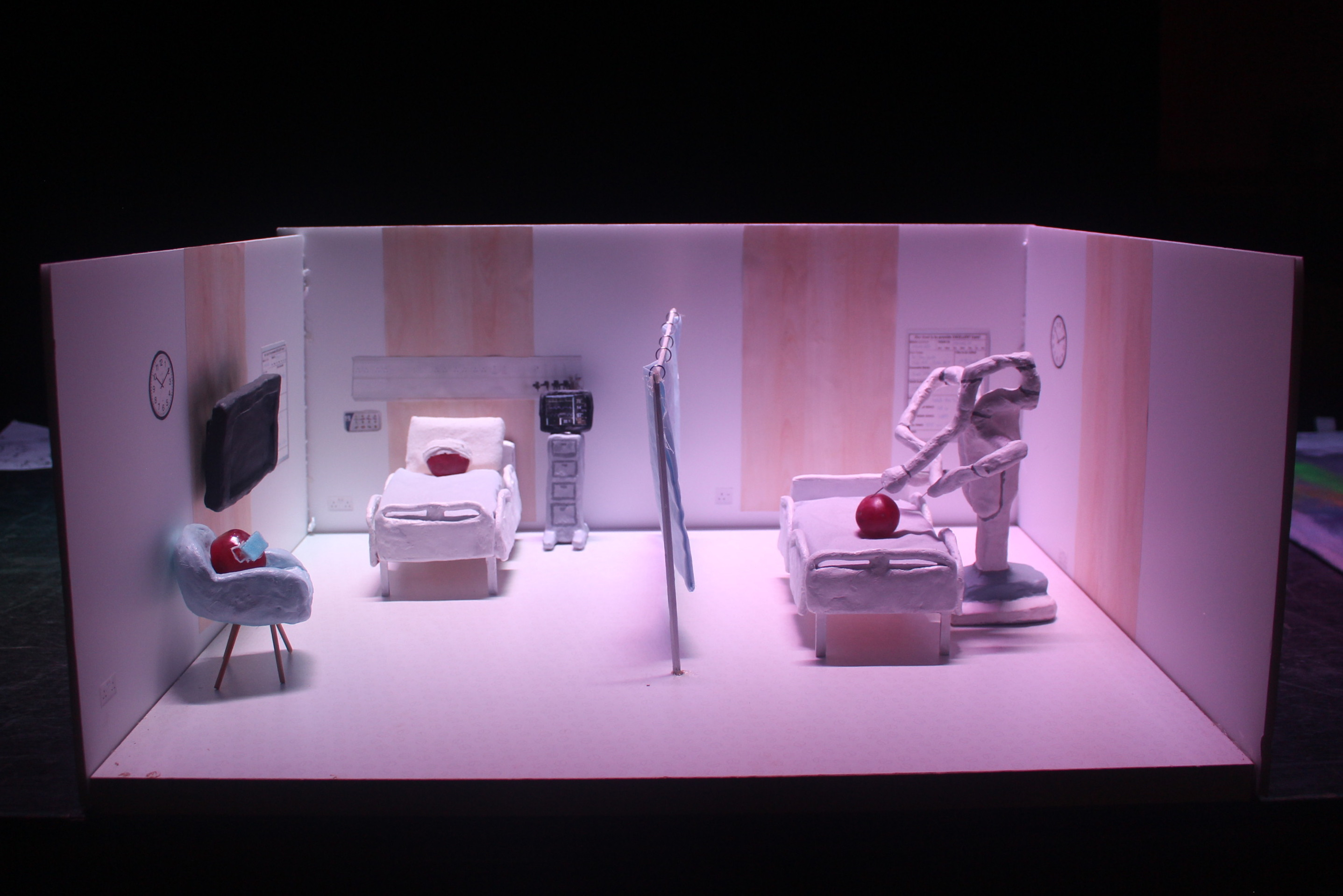
A diorama of a hospital room with the da Vinci Surgical System performing surgery on a grape, with other grapes waiting nearby

Footage and images of the da Vinci Surgical System peeling the skin of a grape became part of an internet meme in November 2018. The original footage of the system being used on a grape was published on YouTube in 2010, and another video featuring the stitching of a grape's skin back together was posted there in 2014.

Cheddar TV posted a video on 7 July 2017 showing the 2010 footage, with the onscreen caption "they did surgery on a grape". This was screenshotted and posted on Instagram by the meme account simpledorito repeating the caption in the post's description. The phrase and imagery went viral, with other social media users, and some brand accounts, expanding on the meme's format. Imagery of a robot performing surgery on a grape at the Peter MacCallum Cancer Centre from May 2018 was incorporated into the meme. The virality of the meme has been attributed to the vagueness and absurdity of the phrase "they did surgery on a grape", and the lack of context provided.

== Other fruit models ==
Bananas are used as a low-fidelity, low-cost model in the training of intraoral suture and some techniques in the treatment of ingrown toenails. However, banana peel is an inferior model to a 3D-printed model in intraoral suture training.

== See also ==
- Grape therapy
- Wine as medicine
