= Helmut Brandt (musician) =

German musician (1931–2001)

Helmut Brandt (1 January 1931, Berlin – 26 July 2001, Stuttgart) was a German jazz baritone saxophonist and bandleader. His style was influenced by Stan Getz and Gil Evans.

Brandt sang in a church choir as a boy, and played violin from age ten before learning saxophone and guitar at a conservatory. He began playing professionally in 1950 and led his own group by 1954. Initially a tenor saxophonist and clarinettist, he switched to baritone in 1954. Through the end of the 1950s he worked in a Berlin radio dance band, and played in the orchestras of Lubo D'Orio and Kurt Widmann. His Mainstream Orchestra was popular in Berlin in the 1970s. Brandt died of a heart attack in 2001.
