= Helene Brandt =

American sculptor (1936–2013)

Helene Brandt (1936 – August 27, 2013) worked in New York City as a sculptor. She has been widely exhibited in the United States, England, Italy, Holland and Mexico. She is the daughter of an inventor and sculptor.

== Exhibitions ==
In the United States she has had solo museum exhibitions at the Chrysler Museum, Norfolk, Virginia; the Hudson River Museum, Yonkers, New York; the Pennsylvania Academy of Fine Arts, Philadelphia, Pennsylvania; the Nassau County Museum of Art, Roslyn, New York; the Bronx Museum of the Arts, Bronx, New York; the Queens Museum of Art, Flushing, New York; and the Sculpture Center, New York City.

Internationally she has exhibited at the Mondriaanhuis Museum of Constructive and Concrete Art, Amersfort, Netherlands; Atelier Scuderi, Florence, Italy; Chiesino di San Ambrogio, Prato, Italy; Centro Cultural de Arte Contemporaneo, Mexico City, Mexico; Museo de Arte Moderno, Mexico City, Mexico; International Art Centre, London, England and Harlow Gallery, Harlow, England.

== School ==
Helene went to school at the Columbia School of Arts, beginning in 1973, where she studied sculpture under George Sugarman, Ronald Bladen, and Sahl Swarz. This forever changed her view on art making. She studied for a year in England in 1975–76, earning a Certificate of Advanced Studies at Saint Martin's School of Art in London, England.

== Awards ==
In 1985 she was awarded a Guggenheim Fellowship and went to Japan to study traditional Japanese Arts. She received a National Endowment for the Arts Fellowship, the Betty Brazil Memorial Award, the BRIO Award for Excellence in the Arts, New York City Municipal Art Society Masterwork Award for public art in the subway (in collaboration with Vito Acconci), and a residency at the Millay Colony for the Arts.

== Public works ==
Brandt has work in many public and private collections including the Israel Museum in Jerusalem (gift of Louise Bourgeois); the Mondriaanhuis Museum of Constructive and Concrete Art, Amersfort, Netherlands and the Hudson River Museum, Yonkers. Her numerous public commissions include sculpture for Sacred Heart University, Fairfield Connecticut; the Staten Island Children's Museum, Staten Island, New York; Long Island University, Brookville, New York; Thorpe Village Meditation Garden, Sparkill, New York; the Brooklyn Bridge Centennial, Brooklyn, New York and Wards Island Sculpture Garden, Wards Island, NY.

== Teaching ==
Brandt has taught sculpture at Columbia University, Schoof of the Arts, New York, NY and Parsons School of Design, New York, NY. She last taught at Empire State College, State University of New York City, NY.
