= Brian Brandt =

American electrical engineer

Brian Brandt is an electrical engineer. He works for Maxim Integrated Products of San Jose, California.

Brandt was named a Fellow of the Institute of Electrical and Electronics Engineers (IEEE) in 2016 for his work on data converters and mixed-signal circuits.
