= Gökhan Brandt =

German politician (born 1997)

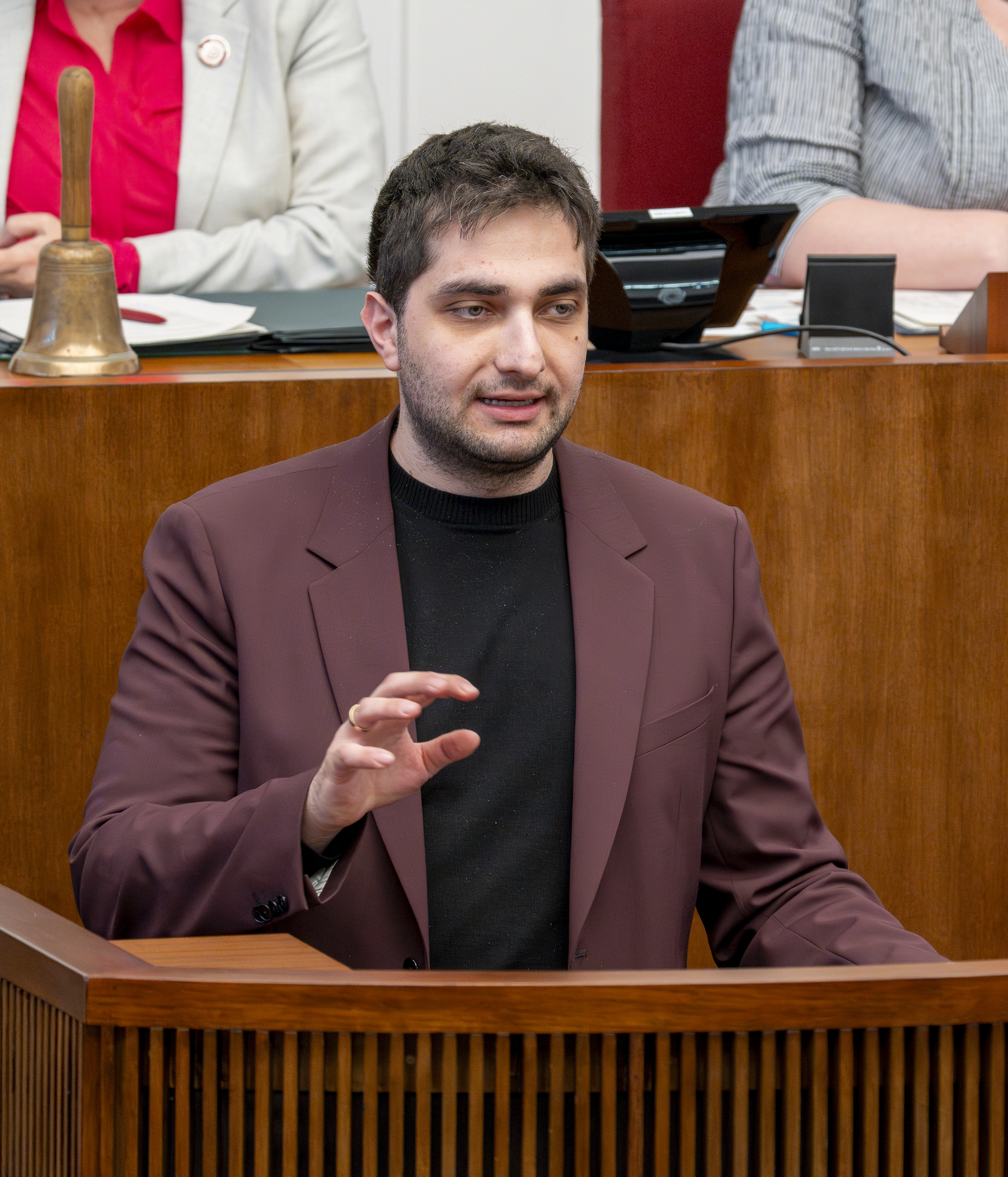
- Brandt in 2025

Member of the Bürgerschaft of Bremen
- Incumbent
- Assumed office 1 November 2024
- Preceded by: Hauke Hilz

Personal details
- Born: 13 December 1997 (age 28) Hagen
- Party: Free Democratic Party (since 2011)

Gökhan Brandt (né Akkamis; born 13 December 1997 in Hagen) is a German politician serving as a member of the Bürgerschaft of Bremen since 2024. He has served as deputy chairman of the Free Democratic Party in Bremerhaven since 2022.
