= Yakov Brandt =

Russian scholar in Chinese studies

Yakov Yakovlevich Brandt
- Яков Яковлевич Брандт
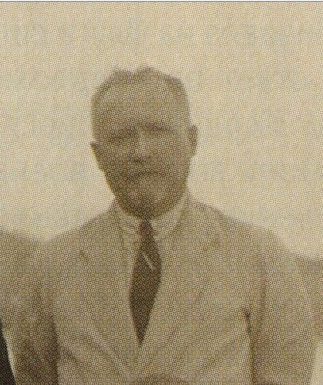
- Born: 1869
- Died: 1944 (aged 74–75); Beijing, China
- Education: Saint Petersburg Imperial University
- Occupations: Sinologist, diplomat, linguist, professor

Yakov Yakovlevich Brandt (Russian: Яков Яковлевич Брандт; 1869–1944, Beijing) was a Russian sinologist, diplomat, linguist and professor.

== Career ==
Brandt first graduated from the Saratov gymnasium. He graduated from the Faculty of Oriental Languages at Saint Petersburg Imperial University in 1892. Subsequently, he worked as an officer on special assignments for the Ministry of Finance and as a senior teacher at the Russian Language School within the Beijing Department of Management of the Chinese Eastern Railway. In 1901, Brandt became the head of the Beijing Department of the Chinese Eastern Railway.

In 1915, he became an Active State Councillor and created plans to expand sinology education in Russia. After the October Revolution, he was a member of the Government (business office) of General D. L. Horvat in Vladivostok in 1918. From 1921 to 1924, he served as professor of the Institute of Russian Language and Law in Beijing, Director of the Russian School of Chinese Language and deputy director of the Harbin Law School. Most of his Chinese and Russian language textbooks were published by the Russian Ecclesiastical Mission in Beijing. In 1925, Brandt began teaching at the North China Union Language School. His teaching over three semesters resulted in the creation of the book "Introduction to literary Chinese (漢文進階)", published in 1927, which was reprinted several times. In 1944, Brandt compiled and published the English-Chinese Vocabulary.

== Later life and legacy ==
Brandt died in 1944 in Beijing. As the director of the Russian School of Chinese Language and Deputy Rector of the Harbin Law Institute, he was the author of numerous books on Russian-language pedagogy and Russian-Chinese dictionaries. During the first two decades of the 20th century, these books were considered the premier Russian-Chinese educational materials.

== Work ==
=== in Russian ===
- Брандт Я. Я. «Русско-Китайский Переводчик: сборник наиболее необходимых слов, выражений и фраз, преимущественно военного характера, с указанием китайских знаков и их произношения».(«Russian-Chinese Translator: a collection of the most necessary words, expressions and phrases, mainly of a military nature, with an indication of Chinese characters and their pronunciation») соч. Я. Брандта. 2-е изд. - Пекин, 1906.
- Брандт Я. Я. «Почин. Опыт учебной хрестоматии для преподавания русскаго языка в начальных китайских школах».(«Initiative. The experience of a textbook for teaching Russian language in primary Chinese schools.») / В 3 частях. Ч.3. Отд.1. Составил Яков Брандт. – Пекин, 1906.
- Брандт Я. Я. «Почин. Опыт учебной хрестоматии для преподавания русскаго языка в начальных китайских школах».(«Initiative. The experience of a textbook for teaching Russian language in primary Chinese schools.») / В 3 частях. Ч.1. Изд. второе. Составил Яков Брандт. – Пекин, 1906.
- Брандт Я. Я. «Самоучитель китайского разговорного языка по методе Туссэна и Лангеншейдта» («Tutorial of Chinese Spoken Language according to the method of Toussaint and Langenscheidt») / Сост. Я. Брандт, ст. преп. Шк. рус. яз. при Пекин. отд. Правл. Кит. Вост. ж. д. Ч. 1-. - Пекин : тип. Рус. духов. миссии, 1909. - 26.
- Брандт Я. Я. «Вдовствующая императрица Цы-си и Император Гуан-сюй» («Empress Dowager Cixi and Guangxu Emperor»). – Харбин, 1909.
- Брандт Я. Я. «Образцы китайскаго оффициальнаго языка с русским переводом и примечаниями = : 漢國之牘箋編» («Samples of the Chinese official language with Russian translation and notes»)/ собрал и обработал Я. Брандт, старший преподаватель Школы китайской восточной ж. д. в Пекине. - Пекин : Тип. Усп. монастыря при Русской духовной миссии, Ч.1., 1910.
- Брандт Я. Я. «Дипломатические беседы» («Diplomatic conversations»): Текст кит. изд. с рус. пер., словами и примеч. / Я. Брандт. - Пекин : тип. Усп. монастыря при Рус. духов. миссии, 1911. - [1], 111 с.;
- Брандт Я. Я. «Самоучитель китайского письменного языка» («Tutorial of the Chinese written language») / Сост. Я. Брандт. Т. 1. - Пекин : тип. Рус. духов. миссии, 1914. - 26. Т. 1. - 1914. - 4, 417 с.
- Брандт Я. Я. Почин. «Опыт учебной хрестоматии для преподавания русскаго языка в начальных китайских школах» («An Experimental Reading Book for Teaching the Russian Language in Primary Chinese Schools»). В 3 частях. Ч.1. Изд. пятое. Составил Яков Брандт. – Пекин, 1915.
- Брандт Я. Я. «Сборник трактатов России с Китаем (начиная с Кульджинского трактата 1851 г.): для чтения в Институте русского языка при Министерстве иностранных дел.» («Collection of treatises of Russia with China (starting from the Treaty of Kulja of 1851): for reading at the Russian Language Institute at the Ministry of Foreign Affairs») – Пекин, 1915.
- Брандт Я. Я. «За кем идти» («For whom to go») / Я. Бранд. - Харбин : Электро-тиро-лит. А. К. Бергут (сын), 1918. - 13 с
- Брандт Я. Я. «Обычныя письма = : 俄文通用尺牍» («Ordinary [Chinese] characters») / Я. Брандт. - Пекин : Типография Русской духовной миссии, 1924. - 2, 193, [2] с.;

=== in English ===
- Introduction to literary Chinese (漢文進階)./ Brandt, Jakov J./ Peiping. 1927
- Wenli particles (虛字指南)./ Brandt, Jakov J./ Peiping. 1929
- Modern Newspaper Chinese: progressive readings with vocabulary, notes, and translations. / By J. J. Brandt, pp. xii + 321. Peiping: Henri Vetch, 1935.
- Introduction to Literary Chinese. By J. J. Brandt. Second edition. 9 × 6, pp. xi + 352. Peiping: Henri Vetch, 1936, 21s.
- Modern newspaper Chinese: progressive readings with vocabulary, notes, and translations./ By J. J. Brandt, pp. xii + 321. Peiping: Henri Vetch, 1939.
- Introduction to spoken Chinese / J. J. Brandt. Peiping: Henri Vetch, 1940 - 240 p.
- Introduction to spoken Chinese / by J. J. Brandt. 1943
- «Introduction to literary Chinese»./ by Brandt, J. J., / — New York: Frederick Ungar Publishing Company. — 503 p. / (ca 1944)
- Brandt's English-Chinese Vocabulary. J. J. Brandt. Department of Oriental Studies, Yale Univ., 1944

== See also ==
- Russia-China relations
