= George Brandt =

German-born British academic (1920–2007)

- Born: George William Brandt; 8 October 1920; Berlin, Weimar Republic
- Died: 24 September 2007 (aged 86)
- Education: University College London; University of Winnipeg
- Occupations: Academic, film producer
- Employer: University of Bristol

George William Brandt (8 October 1920 – 24 September 2007) was a German-born British film scholar and film producer. He was a professor at the University of Bristol.

== Biography ==
Brandt was born on 8 October 1920, in Berlin, the son of a businessman. He and his family relocated to the United Kingdom following the rise of the Nazi Party. He attended the King Alfred School, and while studying at University College London in 1940, he was imprisoned, though was allowed to take his finals while being overseen by prison guards in the exam room. Afterwards, he was transferred to a camp in Canada. In 1945, he had graduated from the University of Winnipeg and was requested to join the National Film Board of Canada by John Grierson. With the board, he helped produce propaganda films as a screenwriter and narrator; he later wrote and edited documentaries. In 1949, he returned to the United Kingdom.

Brandt joined the staff at the University of Bristol in 1951, working in its department of theatre, which had been created in 1947. He was named the university's head of film studies in 1971, a department which he created. He is credited as an early researcher in film and television study, having written British Television Drama in 1981, one of the first academic books on the topic. He edited and wrote numerous other books and articles for academic journals beginning in the 1980s, which he continued to do until his death. He retired in 1986 and was named an emeritus, though regularly visited the university thereafter.

Brandt was also involved creatively in film. He acted in and directed plays, and had a behind-the-scenes role in The Room, the first play by Harold Pinter. He also helped introduce Noh to the United Kingdom. Throughout the 1980s, he directed films for the BBC.

Brandt married Toni Lafrenière in 1949, with whom he had two children. He was a polyglot who spoke Dutch, English, French, German, Italian, and Japanese. He was also a brown belt in judo. In 2004, he was diagnosed with prostate cancer. He died on 27 September 2007, aged 86. He selected the music for his own funeral, including a song from the soundtrack of Citizen Kane and another from Pinocchio. The University of Bristol's drama department named its cinema after him.
