= Ralph Brant =

Mohawk activist

- Known for: Chairman on the Board of Directors for First Nations Technical Institute; Director of Mediation for the Indian Claims Commission

Ralph C. Brant is a Mohawk Indigenous rights activist, and lawyer. He is the chair of the First Nations Technical Institute, and holds a certified management accountant degree from McMaster University in addition to his bachelor of laws degree from Queen's University. Brant has worked extensively in both the private and public sectors. He retired from the federal government in 2009. Brant has also served as Director of Mediation for the Indian Claims Commission.
