= Johanna Brandt =

South African author

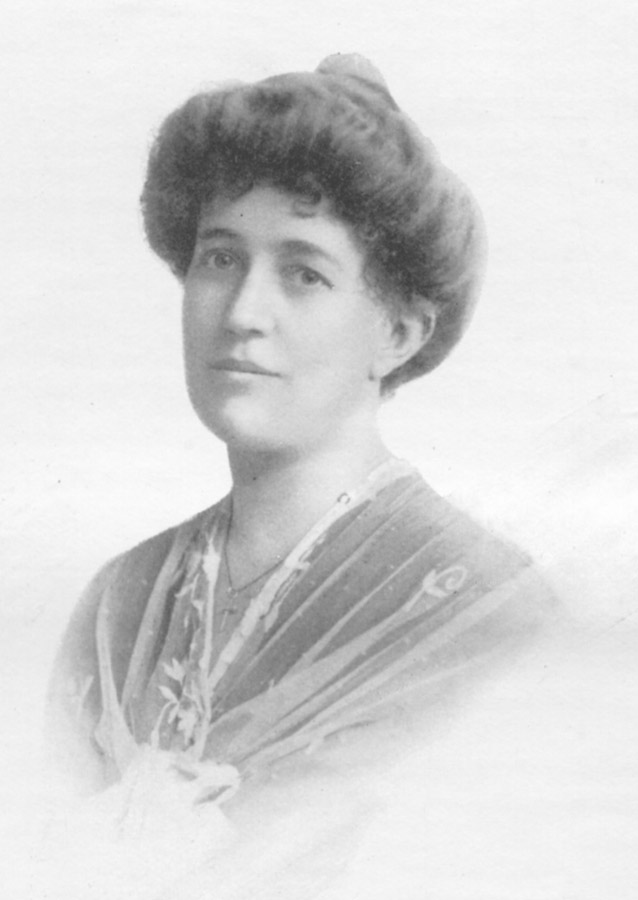
- "The Petticoat Commando"
- Born: 18 November 1876; Heidelberg, South African Republic
- Died: 13 January 1964 (aged 87); Newlands, Cape Town
- Occupation: Nurse
- Known for: Writing, Prophecy
- Spouse: Louis Ernst Brandt
- Parent(s): Pastor Nicolaas and Maria van Warmelo

Signature
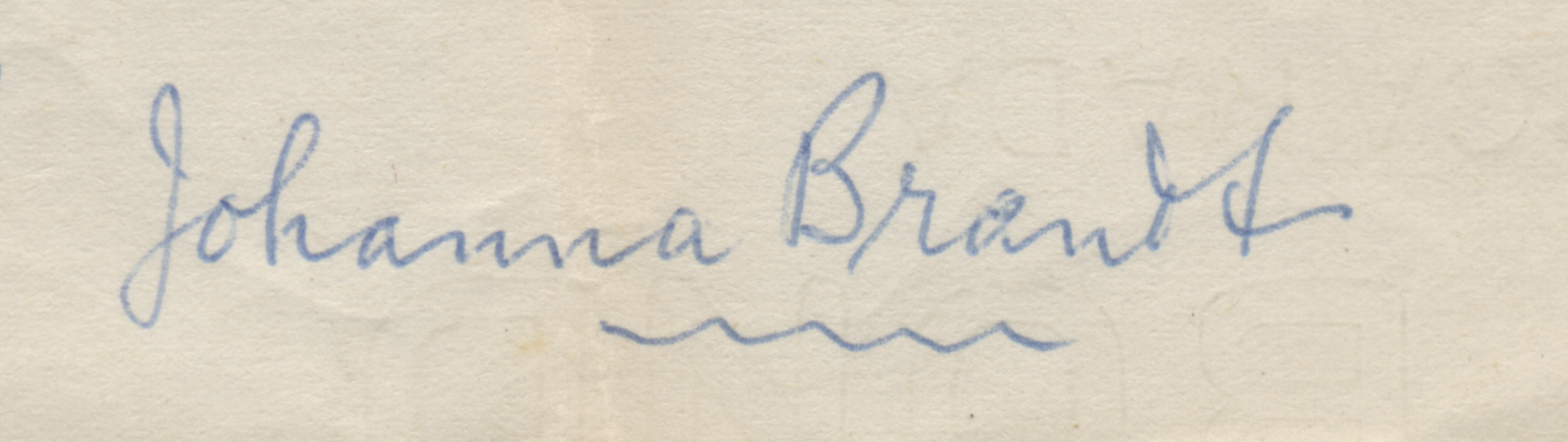

Johanna Brandt (18 November 1876 in Heidelberg, South African Republic – 13 January 1964 in Newlands, Cape Town) was a South African propagandist of Afrikaner nationalism, spy during the Boer War, prophet and writer on health subjects.

== Biography ==
Johanna van Warmelo was born on 18 November 1876, to Pastor Nicolaas Jacobus van Warmelo and his second wife Maria Magdalena Elizabeth Maré. Her father was a Dutch Reformed minister from the Netherlands whilst her mother's family had been early emigrants to southern Africa.

Brandt was educated for two years at the Good Hope Seminary for Young Ladies in Cape Town. When her father died in 1892, Johanna and her mother set out for a six-month tour of Europe.

At the start of the Second Boer War in 1899, Johanna volunteered along with three of her brothers. She served as a nurse until the British captured Pretoria, the capital of the Transvaal. The Boers did not immediately surrender, however, and a long guerrilla war began.

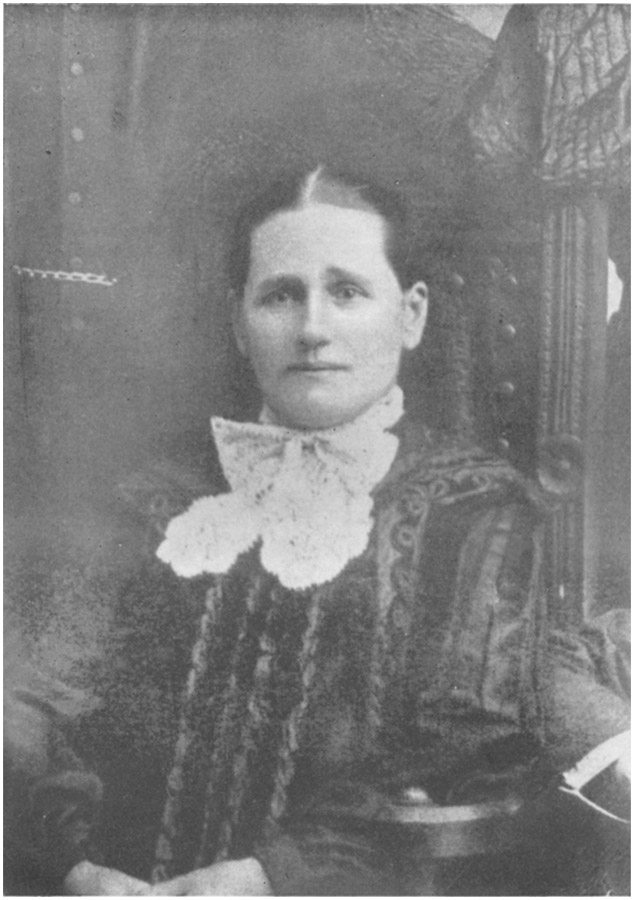
Johanna's accomplice – her mother.

It was during this second phase of the Boer War that Brandt, who was living in Pretoria, became active for the Boer cause. She organised women to spy on British officers and hid prisoners who were on the run. It was her actions that led to W. T. Stead running an article in the Review of Reviews about the appalling conditions in the Irene Concentration Camp, which contributed to a decline in British public support for the war.

After the war she wrote her own account of the Irene Concentration Camp, but her most well-known book was The Petticoat Commando, which told of her and her mother's exploits during the Boer War. The book is dedicated to her mother, "As a peace offering for having brought her into publicity in direct opposition to her wishes". The Van Warmelos' house, which they called Harmony became a centre for the British occupying force. Johanna (who calls herself "Hansie" in the book) is shown as headstrong, and she and her mother exploit the British estimation of the two Boer women as harmless.

It was simply taken for granted that the two women in question were hopelessly cut off from all communication with their friends in the field, and utterly helpless and incapable of assisting their fellow-countrymen.

Among the high-ranking British officers quartered nearby were Lord Kitchener, Lord Roberts and the Duke of Westminster.

The Van Warmelos were largely left in peace by their "guests". This misplaced trust may have been due to Johanna's brother-in-law, Henry Cloete, who was married to her oldest sister. Cloete was a former British agent in South Africa and had been elevated as Companion of the Order of St Michael and St George by Queen Victoria. In their role of harmless civilians, Johanna and her mother were able to collect information on the movements of soldiers and ammunition, and they smuggled this information out using letters written in invisible ink made from lemon juice.

In 1902 Johanna married a minister, Louis Ernst Brandt. She had become so well known that messages of congratulations came from the leaders of countries.

== World War I ==
Brandt remained involved in South African nationalist politics. When the British declared war on Germany in August 1914, they transferred the garrison in South Africa to the European front. Several Boer officers, led by Lieutenant Colonel Manie Maritz, seized this opportunity to declare South Africa's independence. When the Maritz Rebellion was crushed by the South African government 6 months later, the Nasionale Vroueparty, or National Women's Party, was formed in the Transvaal. Its purpose was to work to free the rebels and to care for their families, as well as to serve as an auxiliary for the National Party. Brandt served as secretary at the party's first congress, held in Johannesburg.

== Health writings ==
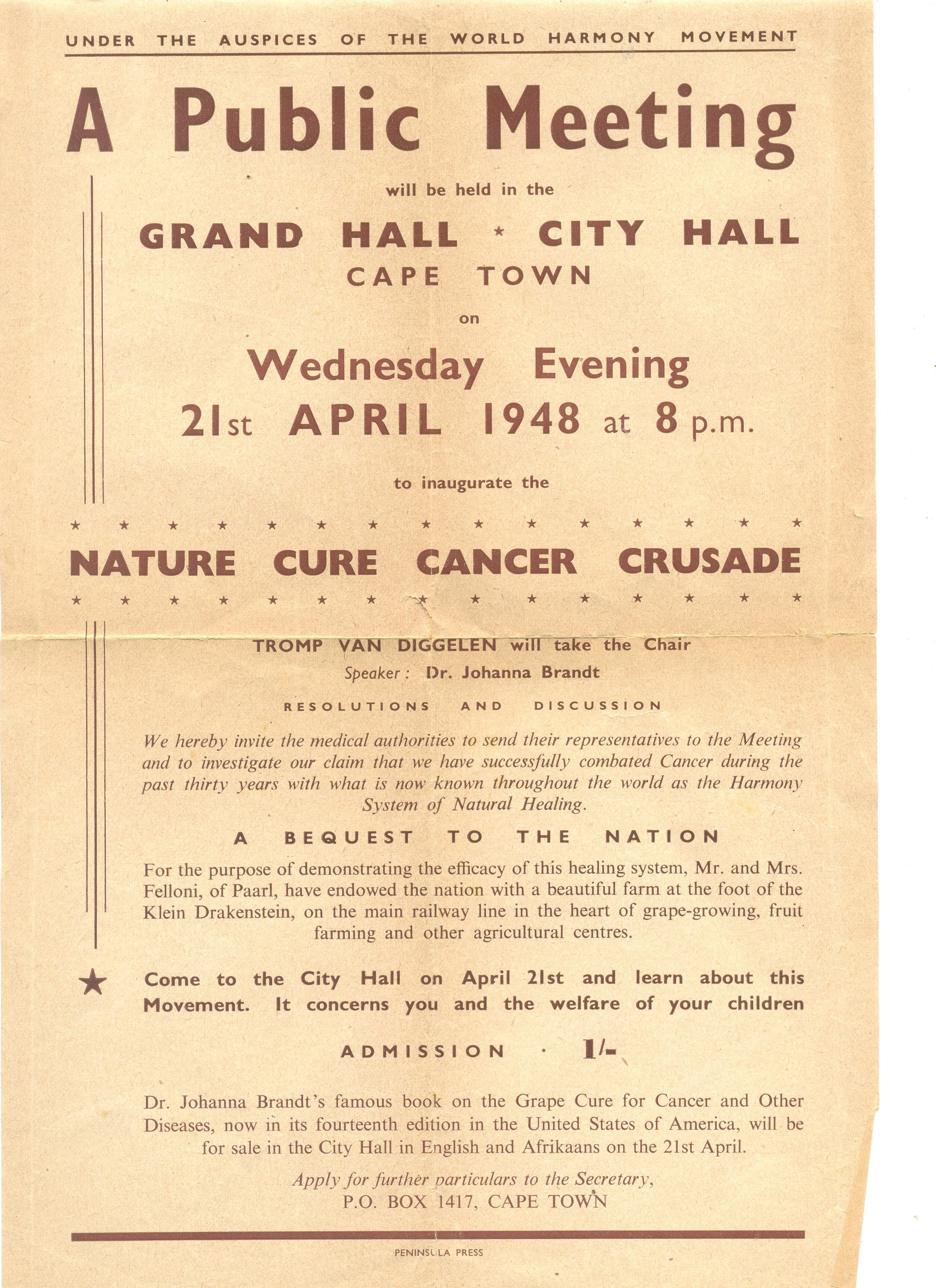
Johanna Brandt - Public meeting notice

Brandt published about twenty pamphlets on the subject of natural remedies for health problems. Her best-known publications are The Grape Cure and Fasting Book. The Grape Cure is said to have been written after Brandt claimed to have cured herself of stomach cancer. The book may have been inspired by the writings of Arnold Ehret, a contemporary, who taught a Grape Cure course, according to Sylvia Saltman. The conclusions expressed by Brandt in The Grape Cure have been denounced as "quackery", however, Brandt's book was an influence for South African author, Essie Honiball, who wrote I Live on Fruit, and Basil Shackleton, author of The Grape Cure: A Personal Testament.

== Prophecy ==
Brandt wrote about revelations that were allegedly made to her on the evening of her mother's death on 7 December 1917 in Pretoria. She published these prophetic revelations in a book called The Millennium in 1918. Her other religious work was the Paraclete, or Coming World Mother which was published in 1936. The works include prophecies for South Africa in which she warns the "tribes" that they must heed their "masters" and of a "dark future". After an alleged angel's revelation in 1916, Brandt is reported to have spoken of South Africans as the chosen race and of Johannesburg being attacked by black people.

== Legacy ==
In 2000, the South African Post office created a series of stamps about the writers of the Boer War, including Sir Arthur Conan Doyle and Winston Churchill. Johanna Brandt appears on the 1.30 rand stamp together with Sol Plaatje and the Anglo-Boer War Medal.

== Major works ==
- Brandt, Johanna (1905). Het concentratie-kamp van Iréne. Hollandsch-Afrikaansche Uitgevers-Maatschappij.
- Het concentratie-kamp van Iréne (Amsterdam: Hollandsch-Afrikaansche Uitgevers-Maatschappij, 1905).
- Die Kappie Kommando, of Boerevrouwen in Geheime Dienst (Amsterdam: J. H. De Bussy & Hollandsch-Afrikaansche Uitgevers-Maatschappij, 1913).
- Brandt, Johanna (1913). The petticoat commando, or, Boer women in secret service. London: Mills & Boon.
- Die Millenium, een voorspelling (Bloemfontein, Eigenverlag 1918).
- The Millenium – A Prophetic Message to the Native Tribes of South Africa (1918).
- Die smeltkroes (1920).
- The Grape Cure, USA: Metaphysical Concepts, 1927.
- Fasting (describes her visions & spiritual experiences when fasting)
- The Fasting-Book: a book on the creation and redemption of the body, Edition 2, De Nationale Pers, 1931, 229 pages.

== Bibliography ==
- Rita van der Merwe, Johanna Brandt en die kritieke jare in die Transvaal 1899–1908 (Pretoria: Protea, 2004), ISBN 1-919825-20-7.
- Annelize Morgan, Die visioene van Johanna Brandt (Mosselbaai: Libanon Uitgewers, 1994), ISBN 0-9583779-4-4.
- Brian Roberts, Those Bloody Women: Three Heroines of the Boer War (London: John Murray, 1991), ISBN 978-0-719-54858-1.

== See also ==
- List of ineffective cancer treatments
