= The Review of Black Political Economy =

Academic journal established in 1970

- Discipline: Political economy
- Language: English
- Edited by: Rhonda Vonshay Sharpe and Gregory Price

Publication details
- History: 1970–present
- Publisher: SAGE Publishing for the National Economic Association
- Frequency: Quarterly

Standard abbreviations
- ISO 4: Rev. Black Political Econ.

Indexing
- ISSN: 0034-6446 (print); 1936-4814 (web)
- LCCN: 76024603
- OCLC no.: 47652005

Links
- Journal homepage

The Review of Black Political Economy is a quarterly peer-reviewed academic journal established in 1970 publishing research on the economic status of African Americans, the African diaspora, and other non-white marginalized populations. It is affiliated with the National Economic Association and is published by SAGE Publishing. Individual memberships can be acquired through membership in the National Economic Association or through direct subscription. (Individual articles can be obtained for a fee.). The journal focuses on research that can inform policies to reduce racial, gender, and ethnic economic inequality. The journal is also a member of the Committee on Public Ethics (COPE).

The founding editor-in-chief was Robert S. Browne. The current editors-in-chief are Rhonda Vonshay Sharpe and Gregory Price. Kristen Broady is associate editor.

== History ==
=== Background and founding ===
Robert S. Browne decided to create The Review of Black Political Economy in order to create "an hospitable arena in which black people could explore ideas as to how they might bring about effective and substantial improvement in their collective economic position." It became a platform for people to publish articles and commentaries on the conditions of black people in the United States from an economic and sociological standpoint. Initially the Review was a product of the Black Economic Research Center (BERC) which Robert Browne founded and ran until 1976. After that, ownership was transferred to the National Economic Association.

Browne chose the term "Political Economy" rather than economics for the title because he felt that "in America at least, for people to effect any significant alteration in their economic position, they will first be obliged to develop a sound political strategy." The initial aim of The Review was to provide a mixture of scholarly and non-scholarly articles which would appeal to a wide range of readers - but Robert S. Browne admitted that this was an ambitious undertaking. Early issues of the journal included a mix of articles by scholars and practitioners. Graduate students were encouraged to submit their research for publication.

The first issue of The Review included seven articles: "Outputs of Minority Entrepreneurship Programs" (Glenn Dixon); "Toward an Overall Assessment of Our Alternatives" (Robert S. Browne); "The Myth and Irrationality of Black Capitalism" (James Boggs); "The Black Manifesto" (James Forman and Others); "What Do You People Want?" (Richard F. America); "The Basic Economics of the Urban and Racial Crisis" (Daniel R. Fusfeld); and "Brimmer and Black Capitalism: An Analysis (Charles Tate). There were also four book reviews in the first issue : "Black Capitalism: Strategy for Business in the Ghetto by Theodore L. Cross" (Thaddeus Spratlen, reviewer); "Race and Poverty: The Economics of Discrimination" edited by John F. Kain (Charles Z. Wilson, reviewer); "The Tenement Landlord by George Sternlieb" (Robert S. Browne, reviewer); and "Poverty and Discrimination by Lester C. Thurlow" (John Handy, reviewer).

=== Publishing agents and editors ===
The journal has had three publishing agents over its 50 years. Transactions Books at Rutgers University was the initial agent. Springer was the second publisher. The current publisher is Sage Publications.

The Review has had 12 editors and 3 associate editors since its founding:

- Robert S. Browne, editor, 1970–71
- Alvin Puryear, editor, 1972
- Courtney Blackman, editor, 1973
- Joseph F. Brooks, editor, 1974
- Lloyd Hogan, editor, 1974–82
- Barbara Ann Posey Jones, associate editor, 1977–82
- Margaret C. Simms, editor, 1983–88
- James B. Stewart, editor, 1989–1995
- Thomas D. Boston, editor, 1996–2002
- Cecilia A. Conrad, editor, 2003–16
- Rhonda Vonshay Sharpe, associate editor, 2002–07
- James H. Peoples, associate editor, 2009–16
- Rhonda Vonshay Sharpe, co-editor, 2017-
- Margaret C. Simms, co-editor, 2017–21

== Features and focus ==
The Review of Black Political Economy (RBPE) promotes critical inquiry in all areas of social and economic inequality focused on African Americans, the African diaspora, and other non-white marginalized populations. As the journal of the National Economic Association, RBPE publishes scholarship that examines public and private policies and their impact on economic and social inequality. It actively seeks articles that utilize economics, political science, public policy, sociology, and other social science theory to examine public and private policies for their ability to reduce economic inequality.

=== Articles ===
The journal consists of yearly volumes with quarterly published issues. The main research published in The Review of Black Political Economy consists primarily of papers that are typically less than 20 pages long.

=== Book reviews ===
The Review of Black Political Economy occasionally features book reviews, either solicited by the editors or blind reviewed unsolicited submissions from its readership. The books being reviewed center around aspects of economics and the reviews published in the journal are typically no more than 10 pages long. Several notable books that were reviewed include African Americans in the U.S. Economy by Cecilia Conrad, John Whitehead, Patrick Mason, and James Stewart, The End of Poverty by Jeffrey Sachs, and Liberating E Economics: Feminist Perspectives on Families, Work, and Globalization by Drucilla K. Barker and Susan F. Feiner.

=== Presidential and other addresses ===
The Review of Black Political Economy also occasionally publishes presidential addresses from the heads of the National Economic Association, which are given at the annual meeting of the organization, usually held in conjunction with the Allied Social Sciences Association conference. The journal has also published written versions of presentations by winners of the NEA Samuel Z. Westerfield Award and the talks in the Sir W. Arthur Lewis lecture series. Some of the notable addresses published by The Review of Black Political Economy include the following:

Presidential addresses:

- William A. Darity, Jr., "Abram Harris: An Odyssey from Howard to Chicago," vol. 15, no 3.
- Thomas D. Boston, "Sixteenth Century European Expansion and the Economic Decline of Africa (in honor of Walter Rodney)", vol. 20, no 4.
- James B. Stewart, "Toward Broader Involvement of Black Economists in Discussions of Race and Public Policy: A Plea for Reconceptualization of Race and Power in Economic Theory", vol. 23, no. 3
- Patrick L. Mason, "Identity, Markets, and Persistent Racial Inequality, vol. 32, no. 1.
- Gregory Price, "Economists of the World You Cite!", vol. 35, no. 1.
- Juliet U. Elu, "Gender Inquality and Human Development in Sub-Saharan Africa," vol. 40, no.2.

W. Arthur Lewis Lectures:

- Charles P. Kindleberger, "The Lewis Model of 'Economic Growth with Unlimited Supplies of Labor," vol. 16., no. 3.
- Ronald Findlay, "National and Global Perspectives, on Economic Development--Two Models of Arthur Lewis," vol. 18, no. 1.

== Publication guidelines and editorial policy ==
The Review of Black Political Economy publishes a variety of writings including research notes, editorials, and articles. The journal runs on a blinded peer review process to uphold the quality of the work. Anyone who made any contribution to the writing must be listed as one of the authors of the writing. The Review of Black Political Economy makes it mandatory for authors to mention their funding provided for their work. It is also required that the writing submitted for publication in The Review is not being considered to be published in any other journal.

== Effectiveness ==
Research has been conducted to ascertain whether The Review of Black Political Economy has had a noticeable effect on the number and contributions of Black economists. The Review of Black Political Economy was started with a few core values in mind, providing a platform for scholars to discuss socioeconomic topics such as discrimination and poverty as they relate to Black populations. Results from a bibliometric analysis indicate that the academic standing of Black economists has been improved due to the existence of The Review of Black Political Economy, and the original issues the journal formed to address have seen some improvement. These findings imply a 'plausible counterfactual,' meaning that a lack of existence of the journal would result in a lower overall scholarly status for Black economists in the profession. One example of this in the literature is the publications released under two female Black editors, Margaret Simms and Cecilia Conrad. By having these two serve as the first two Black female journal editors, more academic involvement was encouraged and inspired within the field and demographic, and this was facilitated by The Review of Black Political Economy.

=== Landmark papers ===
Many significant economic findings throughout many years have been published in The Review of Black Political Economy. The following list is a selection of economic publications published in The Review of Black Political Economy, all of which were heavily cited due to their impact, and the citation for the article in which they were published.

- Race and the dynamics of men's mobility into management from working class jobs (2017) - Wilson, George; Lagae, Bryan (January 2017). "Race and the Dynamics of Men's Mobility into Management from Working Class Jobs". The Review of Black Political Economy. 44 (3–4): 233–249. doi:10.1007/s12114-017-9252-2. S2CID 158176074.
- Black-white disparities in test scores (2016) - Fernandes, Ronald; Ha, Inhyuck Steve; McElroy, Susan Williams; Myers, Samuel L. (January 2016). "Black-White Disparities in Test Scores: Distributional Characteristics". The Review of Black Political Economy. 43 (2): 209–232. doi:10.1007/s12114-015-9230-5. S2CID 146498337.
- Skin shade stratification and the psychological cost of unemployment (2015) — Diette, Timothy M.; Goldsmith, Arthur H.; Hamilton, Darrick; Darity, William (January 2015). "Skin Shade Stratification and the Psychological Cost of Unemployment: Is there a Gradient for Black Females?". The Review of Black Political Economy. 42 (1–2): 155–177. doi:10.1007/s12114-014-9192-z. S2CID 153808273.
- Community-based asset building and community wealth (2014) Nembhard, Jessica Gordon (January 2014). "Community-Based Asset Building and Community Wealth". The Review of Black Political Economy. 41 (2): 101–117. doi:10.1007/s12114-014-9184-z. S2CID 153578980.
- The effect of a high school diploma (2013) — McDaniel, Marla; Kuehn, Daniel (January 2013). "What Does a High School Diploma Get You? Employment, Race, and the Transition to Adulthood". The Review of Black Political Economy. 40 (4): 371–399. doi:10.1007/s12114-012-9147-1. S2CID 153668451.
- Policies for economic justice (2012) - Darity, William; Hamilton, Darrick (January 2012). "Bold Policies for Economic Justice". The Review of Black Political Economy. 39 (1): 79–85. doi:10.1007/s12114-011-9129-8. S2CID 154570190.
- The relative returns to graduating from a Hbcu (2011) Price, Gregory N.; Spriggs, William; Swinton, Omari H. (January 2011). "The Relative Returns to Graduating from a Historically Black College/University: Propensity Score Matching Estimates from the National Survey of Black Americans". The Review of Black Political Economy. 38 (2): 103–130. doi:10.1007/s12114-011-9088-0. S2CID 55848929.
- Baby bonds (2010) - Hamilton, Darrick; Darity, William (January 2010). "Can 'Baby Bonds' Eliminate the Racial Wealth Gap in Putative Post-Racial America?". The Review of Black Political Economy. 37 (3–4): 207–216. doi:10.1007/s12114-010-9063-1. S2CID 17880568.
- Costs of credit and credit market discrimination (2009) — Weller, Christian E. (January 2009). "Credit Access, the Costs of Credit and Credit Market Discrimination" (PDF). The Review of Black Political Economy. 36 (1): 7–28. doi:10.1007/s12114-009-9034-6. S2CID 15871091.
- Improving schools with finance (2008) — Loubert, Linda (January 2008). "Increasing Finance, Improving Schools". The Review of Black Political Economy. 35 (1): 31–41. doi:10.1007/s12114-008-9019-x. S2CID 153322202.
- The effect of attending an Hbcu on persistence and graduation outcomes of African-American college students (2007) Wilson, Valerie Rawlston (March 2007). "The Effect of Attending an Hbcu on Persistence and Graduation Outcomes of African-American College Students". The Review of Black Political Economy. 34 (1–2): 11–52. doi:10.1007/s12114-007-9006-7. S2CID 155038147.
- Marriages ratios of young black women (2006) — Brown, Christopher; Kesselring, Randall (March 2006). "Declining Marriage Ratios of Young Black Women: Testing Alternative Economic Hypotheses". The Review of Black Political Economy. 33 (4): 27–48. doi:10.1007/BF02915421. S2CID 41857249.
- The research productivity of black economists (2005) — Fosu, Augustin Kwasi (December 2005). "The Research Productivity of Black Economists: Ranking by Individuals and Doctoral Alma Mater—Comment". The Review of Black Political Economy. 33 (3): 45–49. doi:10.1007/s12114-006-1003-8. S2CID 154239415.
- Capitalist System (1978) Harris, Donald J. (January 1978) "Capitalist Exploitation and Black Labor: Some Conceptual Issues" The Review of Black Political Economy 8 (2)" 133-151 doi/pdf/10.1007/BF02689492.
