= William Spriggs =

American economist (1955–2023)

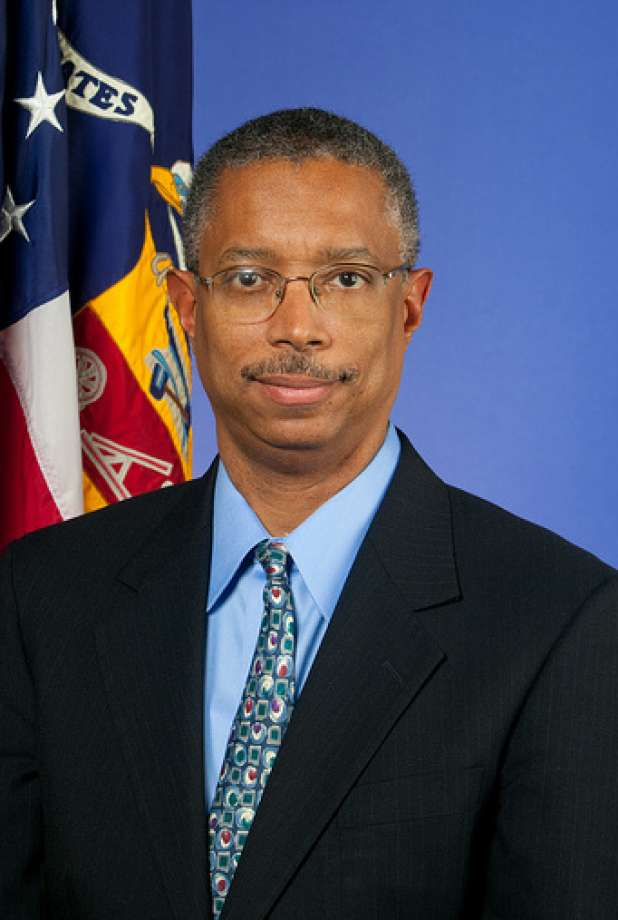
- Official portrait, 2011

Assistant Secretary of Labor for Policy
- In office 2009–2012
- President: Barack Obama
- Preceded by: Leon Sequeira
- Succeeded by: Rajesh Nayak

Personal details
- Born: William Edward Spriggs; April 8, 1955 Washington, D.C., U.S.
- Died: June 6, 2023 (aged 68) Reston, Virginia, U.S.
- Spouse: Jennifer Dover (m. 1985)
- Children: 1
- Education: Williams College (BA); University of Wisconsin–Madison (MA, PhD)

Academic work
- Discipline: Labor economics
- Institutions: Howard University; Norfolk State University; North Carolina A&T State University

William Edward Spriggs (April 8, 1955 – June 6, 2023) was an American economist who was a professor of economics at Howard University, chief economist for the AFL-CIO, and Assistant Secretary of Labor for Policy in the Obama administration from 2009 to 2012.

Spriggs' work and research focused on workforce discrimination, minimum wage, national and international labor standards, and pay equity. He supported organized labor and liberal economics.

== Early life and education ==
Spriggs was born in Washington, D.C., on April 8, 1955. His father, Thurman Spriggs, was a Tuskegee Airman who held a PhD in physics and worked as a professor. His mother, Julienne (Henderson) Spriggs, was a World War II veteran and school teacher.

Spriggs attended public elementary schools in northeast and southeast Washington D.C. at the same time his mother was finishing her college degree. He spent much of his subsequent upbringing in Norfolk, Virginia, after his father began teaching at Norfolk State University.

After high school, Spriggs earned a Bachelor of Arts degree in economics and political science from Williams College. He continued onto graduate school on a National Science Foundation Minority Graduate Fellowship. He attended the University of Wisconsin–Madison, where he earned his Master of Arts (1979) and PhD (1984), both in economics. His doctoral dissertation focused on the accumulation of wealth by African Americans in Virginia between 1900 and 1914. He earned the National Economic Association's 1985 dissertation prize for his work. During this time, he also served as a co-president of the American Federation of Teachers Local 3220.

== Career ==
=== Early career ===
Spriggs was an assistant professor for two years at North Carolina Agricultural and Technical State University, where he taught introductory economics. He later moved to Norfolk State University, where he was the director of the honors program and an assistant professor of management for six years.

=== Organizational work and advocacy ===
Spriggs left academia for some time to pursue research and advocacy, beginning with the Economic Policy Institute. There, he studied industrial relations, labor history, and the replacement of striking workers. Spriggs left the EPI in 1993 to join the Clinton administration as the director designate of the National Commission for Employment Policy. He advised politicians on training, education, reemployment, and the financing and development of historically black colleges and universities. He also led the National Wage Record Database Design Project Report from 1993 to 1994.

Spriggs joined the Joint Economic Committee as a senior economist, serving the Senate minority (then the Democrats). He specifically advised Congressmen Kweisi Mfume, Pete Stark, and Senator Jeff Bingaman. He continued serving in federal roles throughout the Clinton administration, including tenures in the U.S. Department of Commerce Economics and Statistics Administration and the U.S. Small Business Administration's Office of Government Contracting and Minority Business Development.

Spriggs left the Clinton administration in 1998 to join the Institute for Opportunity and Equality League as its executive director and advocate for research, advocacy and progressive public policy. He stayed for six years, working with fellow civil rights activists Maya Rockeymoore, Cheryl Hill Lee, Valerie Wilson, Hugh Price, Dorothy Height, Joseph Lowery, Norman Hill, and Bill Lucy. Spriggs later returned to the Economic Policy Institute before joining Howard University in 2005 as the chair of the economics department. He concurrently served as a senior fellow for the Community Service Society of New York and board chair of the UAW Retirees of the Dana Corp, Healthcare Trust for UAW Retirees of Ford Motor Company, and as a board member of the Retirement Healthcare Administration Corporation.

=== Support of Barack Obama and assistant secretary of labor ===
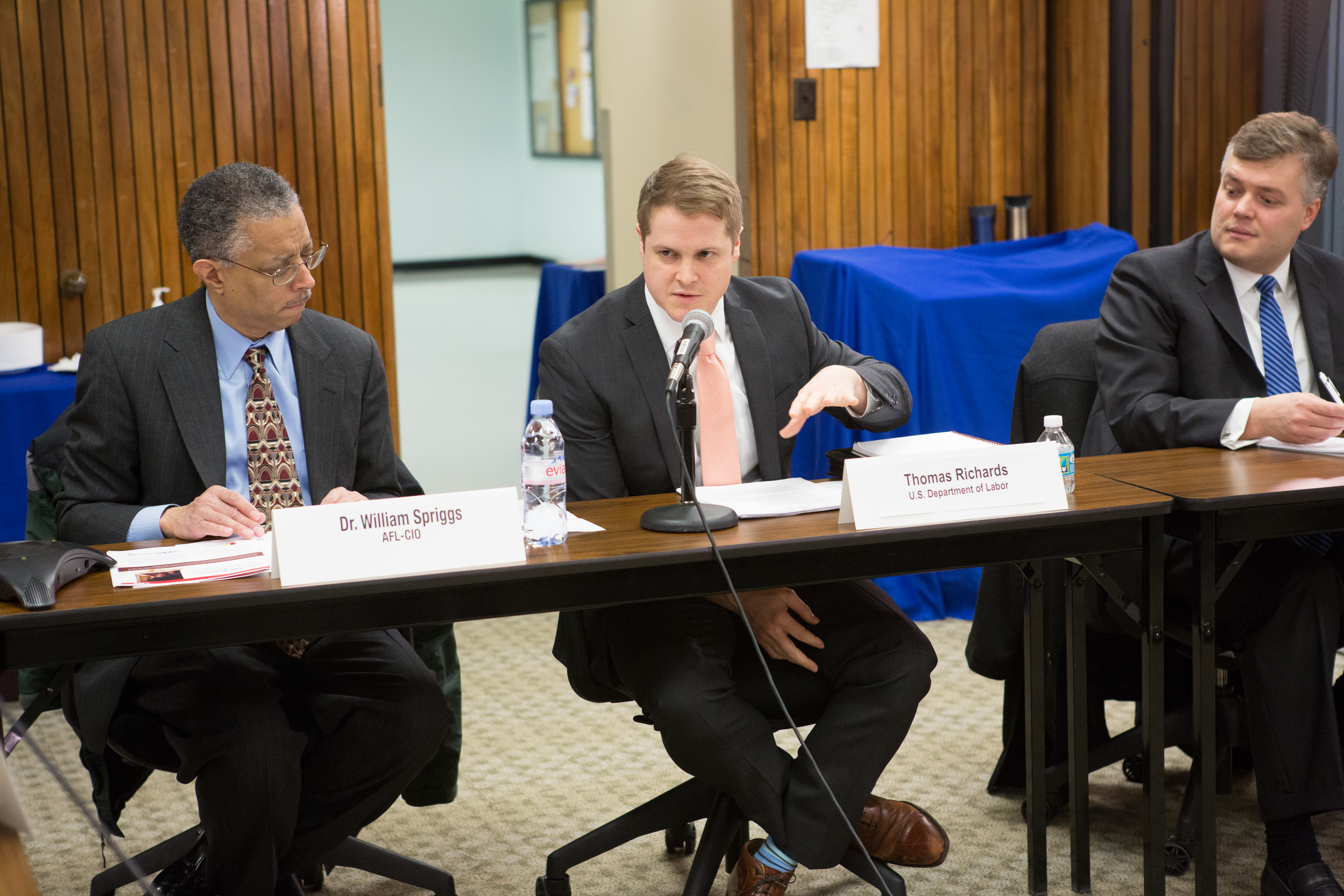
Spriggs representing the AFL-CIO at the U.S. Department of Labor's Bureau of International Labor Affairs (ILAB) Black History Month Roundtable in 2015

Spriggs was a longtime supporter of Barack Obama, both during the latter's bid for presidency and after while serving on the 2008 Obama–Biden transition team. He specifically endorsed then presidential-nominee Obama's plan to focus on the alternative energy sector for new jobs. He also, along with dozens of other economists, endorsed the Employee Free Choice Act in early 2009.

The Obama administration nominated Spriggs for the position of assistant secretary of policy in the Department of Labor in June 2009. He was easily approved by a voice vote of the full Senate on October 21, 2009. As the assistant secretary of policy, he continued to argue for organized labor and increased support for the middle class. He represented the United States at the G-20 Labor Ministerial meeting in Guadalajara, Mexico and headed the U.S. delegation to the 101st International Labour Conference of the International Labour Organization in Switzerland.

=== Return to academia ===
In 2012, Spriggs returned to his role as professor of economics at Howard University. He also accepted the position of chief economist for the AFL-CIO; through this role, he joined the board of the National Bureau of Economic Research (NBER).

=== Open letter to economists ===
In June 2020, Spriggs released an open letter to economists in the wake of the murder of George Floyd and subsequent protests. In his letter, he called on economists to recognize the racist roots of most explorations of racial disparities in economics. He argued that models of disparities between White and Black Americans based on differences in human capital accumulation frequently recognize the existence of racist discrimination in schooling and housing, but then assume this same discrimination does not exist in employment relationships. He discussed how models of statistical discrimination in economic outcomes between races assume away history, laws, and social norms, and even the way that racial categories are themselves the product of this history. In addition, he argued that models of disparities that assume inherent African-American inferiority are a constant microaggression for African-American economists and expressed frustration that many White economists are ignorant of work done by Black economists on these same topics. He called on economists who use race in their work to better understand the ways that history and policy have shaped racial categories and focus on studying big questions about the institutions that shape economic outcomes. The letter received a great deal of media coverage, with Spriggs invited to lengthy interviews by multiple major publications.

== Personal life ==
Spriggs married Jennifer Dover in 1985, and they had a son.

Spriggs died from a stroke at a hospital in Reston, Virginia, on June 6, 2023, aged 68. In a statement, U.S. President Joe Biden said, "I am deeply saddened by the passing of Bill Spriggs, a man who brought as much lasting brilliance to economics as he brought joy to his friends and colleagues."

== Honors ==
=== Professional awards ===
- Robert M. Ball Award, National Academy of Social Insurance, 2016
- Benjamin L. Hooks "Keeper of the Flame" Award, NAACP, 2014
- Chairman's Award, Congressional Black Caucus, 2003
- National Economics Association Dissertation Award, 1985
- National Science Foundation Minority Graduate Fellow, 1979–1984

=== Other ===
- Bicentennial Award, Williams College, 2010
- Harold Graves Essay Prize (University of Wisconsin–Madison, Department of Economics) 1980

== Selected works ==
=== Books and book chapters ===
- "A Look at Inequality, Workers' Rights, and Race", Law & Inequality, Vol. 36, no. 2 (2018): 61–75.
- "Institutions to Remedy the New Inequality", in Thomas I. Palley and Gustv A. Horn (eds), Restoring Shared Prosperity: A Policy Agenda from Leading Keynesian Economists (Washington, DC, 2013). ISBN 978-1493749423
- "The Changing Face of Poverty in America", in Margaret Roush (ed.), U.S. National Debate Topic 2009–2010: Social Services for the Poor (H. W. Wilson Company: New York, 2009). ISBN 978-0824210908
- "African Americans and Social Security", in Daniel Fireside, John Miller, Bryan Snyder (eds), Real World Macro, 25th Edition (Economic Affairs Bureau, Inc.: Boston, 2008). ISBN 978-1878585707
- "Black Liberalism", International Encyclopedia of the Social Sciences, 2nd edition, William A. Darity Jr. (ed.), (Macmillan Reference USA: Detroit, 2008). ISBN 978-0028659657
- "Participatory Democracy and Race Relations in the U.S.", in Claire Nelson and Stacy RichardsKennedy (eds) Advancing Equity in Latin America: Putting Policy into Practice (Inter American Development Bank: Washington, 2007).
- "Social Security and American Values", in Calvin Logue, Lynn Messina and Jean DeHart (eds), Representative American Speeches, 2004–2005 (New York, NY: H. W. Wilson Company, 2005). ISBN 978-0824210380
- With Rhonda M. Williams, "What Do We Need to Explain About African American Unemployment", in Robert Cherry and William M. Rodgers III (eds), Prosperity for All? The Economic Boom and African Americans (New York: Russell Sage, 2000): 188–207. ISBN 978-0871541970
- With Samuel Myers Jr., "Black Employment, Criminal Activity and Entrepreneurship: A Case Study of New Jersey", in Patrick L. Mason and Rhonda M. Williams (eds), Race, Markets and Social Outcomes (Norwell, MA: Kluwer Academic Publishers, 1996): 31–64. doi:10.1007/978-1-4615-6157-6_3 ISBN 978-0792398936
- With John Schmitt, "The Minimum Wage: Blocking the Low-Wage Path", in Todd Schaefer and Jeff Faux (eds), Reclaiming Prosperity: A Blueprint for Progressive Economic Reform, (Armonk, NY: M. E. Sharpe, 1996): 163–172. ISBN 978-1563247682

=== Publications ===
- von Lockette, N. D., W. E. Spriggs, "Wage Dynamics and Racial and Ethnic Occupational Segregation Among Less-Educated Men in Metropolitan Labor Markets". Review of Black Political Economy 43, 35–56 (2016).
- Price, G. N., W. Spriggs, and O. H. Swinton, "The Relative Returns to Graduating from a Historically Black College/University: Propensity Score Matching Estimates from the National Survey of Black Americans". Rev Black Polit Econ 38, 103–130 (2011).
- Rodgers III, William M., William E. Spriggs, and Bruce W. Klein. "Do the Skills of Adults Employed in Minimum Wage Contour Jobs Explain Why They Get Paid Less?", Journal of Post Keynesian Economics 27, no. 1 (2004): 37–66.
- Rodgers, William M., and William E. Spriggs. "What does the AFQT really measure: Race, wages, schooling and the AFQT score". The Review of Black Political Economy 24, no. 4 (1996): 13–46.
- Maxwell, Nan L. "The Effect on Black-White Wage Differences of Differences in the Quantity and Quality of Education". Industrial and Labor Relations Review 47, no. 2 (1994): 249–64. doi:10.2307/2524419.
- Spriggs, William E. "Changes in the Federal Minimum Wage: A Test of Wage Norms". Journal of Post Keynesian Economics 16, no. 2 (1993): 221–39.
- Spriggs, William E., and James Stanford (1993), "Economists' Assessments of the Likely Employment and Wage Effects of the North American Free Trade Agreement", Hofstra Labor & Employment Law Journal: Vol. 10 : Iss. 2, Article 3.
- Spriggs, William. "Measuring Residential Segregation: An Application of Trend Surface Analysis". Phylon 45, no. 4 (1984): 249–63. doi:10.2307/274906.
