= Asiedu =

Asiedu is both a surname and a given name. Notable people with the name include:

== Surname ==
- Elizabeth Asiedu, Ghanaian-born American economist
- John Alphonse Asiedu (born 1962), Ghanaian Roman Catholic bishop
- Joseph Richard Asiedu, Ghanaian judge and politician

== Middle name ==
- Johnson Asiedu Nkatie, Ghanaian politician

== Given name ==
- Asiedu Attobrah (born 1995), Ghanaian professional footballer
- Asiedu Yirenkyi (1942–2018), Ghanaian playwright
