= Gregory Price =

Gregory Price may refer to:

- Gregory Price (economist), American economist
- Gregory Price (politician), English politician
