= Elizabeth Asiedu =

Ghanaian economist

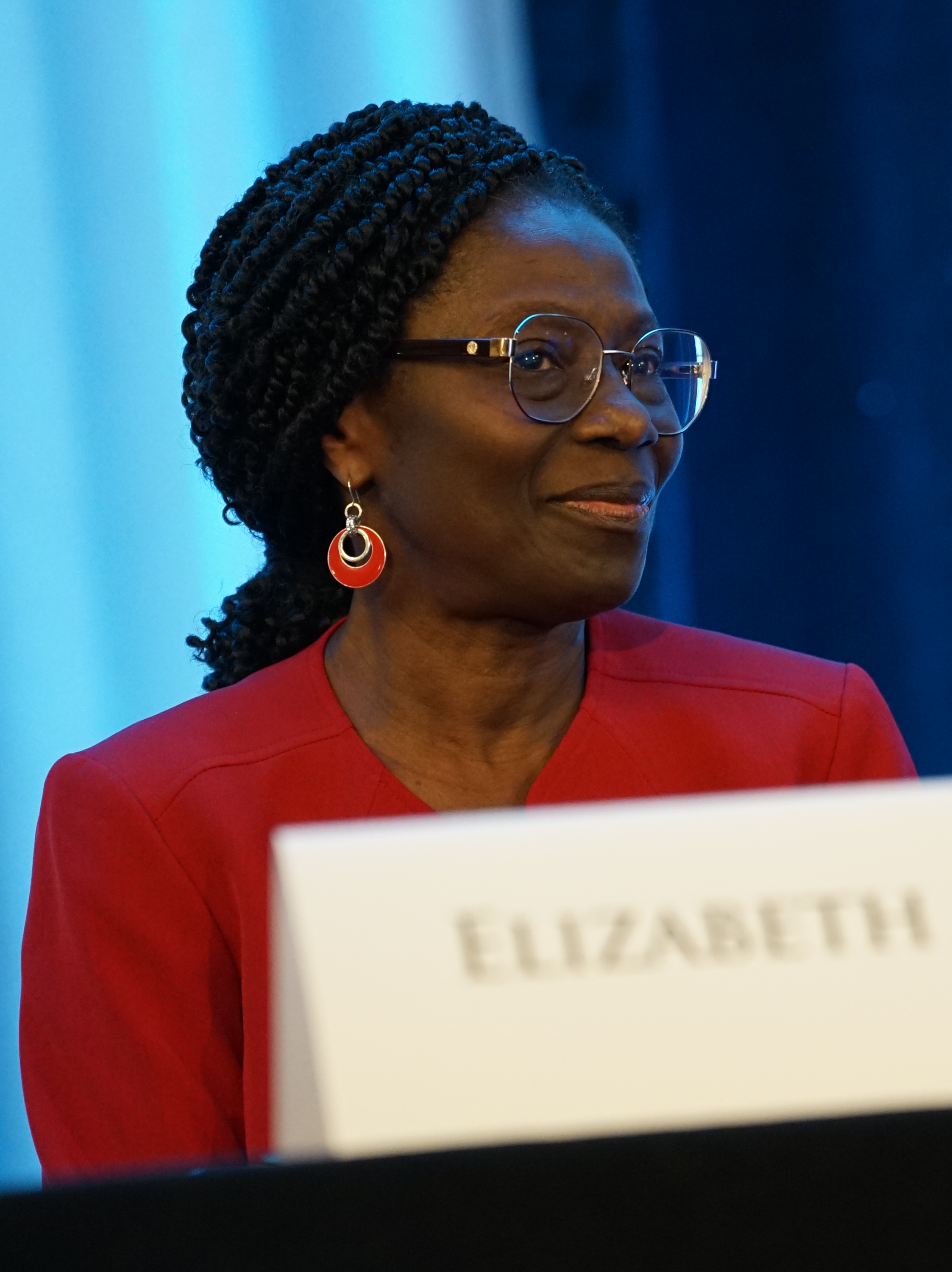
- Asiedu at ASSA 2026
- Education: University of Ghana, University of Illinois at Urbana–Champaign (UIUC)
- Scientific career
- Fields: Economics
- Workplaces: Howard University, University of Kansas
- Website: https://profiles.howard.edu/elizabeth-asiedu

Elizabeth Asiedu is a professor of economics at Howard University and a former professor at the University of Kansas. She has facilitated research that is centered around foreign aid, foreign directed investment (FDI), and gender. She is a founder of the Association for the Advancement of African Women (AAAWE), as well as the current president of the organization. Asiedu is an editor of the Journal of African Development.

== Education ==
Asiedu received her first degree, a B.S. (Hons) in computer science and mathematics from the University of Ghana in 1988. She then went on to receive an M.S. in mathematics (1992), an M.S. in economics (1994), and a PhD in economics (1998) from the University of Illinois at Urbana-Champaign.

== Career ==
Since 2021, Asiedu has been a professor of economics at Howard University, where she teaches both undergraduate and graduate economics. From 2012 to 2021, Asiedu was a professor of economics at the University of Kansas. Asiedu was also the associate chair and the director of graduate studies of the economics department at the University of Kansas from 2007 to 2009. She sits on the board of the African Finance Economic Association (AFEA), was president of the organization between 2011 and 2013, and was the vice president between 2007 and 2010. Additionally, she was an editor of the Journal of African Development (JAD) between 2017 and 2018. Dr. Asiedu is also a founder and president of the Association for the Advancement of African Women (AAAWE). She sat on the board of the National Economic Association between 2016 and 2019. Asiedu is a member of the following;

- Global Research Competition Steering Committee, Global Development Network, India, October 2011 – Present
- Distinguished External Reference Group, The African Capacity Building Foundation, Zimbabwe, April 2012 – Present
- Member of a four-scholar international panel committee to conduct a ten-year review of The United Nations University/ World Institute of Development and Economic Research (UNU/WIDER), Finland, May 2010-January 2011

== Research and selected publications ==
=== Access to Credit by Small Businesses: How Relevant Are Race, Ethnicity, and Gender? (2012) ===
In this article, Asiedu, James A. Freeman, and Akwasi Nti-Addae explore the role of race, ethnicity, and gender on credit access. Their study categorizes race and ethnicity into the following: Black, Hispanic, Asian/Native American/Pacific Islander (ANP), White female, and White male. They find that firms owned by visible minorities have a higher denial rate with the highest denial rate for Hispanics. Additionally, the denial rate for has increased between 1998 and 2003. Finally, they find that minority-owned firms also paid higher interests than the White-male owned firms. In terms of gender, they find that firms owned by White women did not experience discrimination when accessing credit, and they also paid less interest rates own loans than their male counterparts. Their study showcases that factors such as race, ethnicity and gender do in fact affect access to credit and interest paid on loans.

=== Does Foreign Aid In Education Promote Economic Growth? (2014) ===
The paper "Does Foreign Aid in Education Promote Economic Growth? Evidence From Sub-Saharan Africa" explores whether the foreign aid that is aimed towards education is effective in primary education and secondary education in sub-Saharan Africa. Asiedu's study focuses on 38 countries from 1990 to 2004. She argues that although educational financial aid is positively related to growth (because it provides resources such as books, training for teachers, etc.) this is only the case for primary education. Educational financial aid in secondary education, on the other hand, does not contribute to economic growth, in fact it may have an adverse effect on growth. This is because of the lack of employment for secondary school graduates (which she suggests is true to many countries in Sub-Saharan Africa), she suggests that another reason why this might be true is the lack of quality secondary education (such that increased time spent in school has no benefits). Furthermore, she argues that this might be true because many secondary school graduates are employed in jobs that are low in productivity, thus reducing the potential for economic growth. Finally, she argues that there is a lack of physical capital and other “complementary inputs” in Sub-Saharan Africa that would otherwise encourage productive labour in the region.

=== The Impact of HIV/AIDS on Foreign Direct Investment (2015) ===
In the paper "The Impact of HIV/AIDS on Foreign Direct Investment: Evidence from Sub-Saharan Africa," Asiedu alongside Jin and Kanyama illuminate the relationship between HIV/AIDS and foreign direct investment (FDI). They examine this in 41 countries in Sub-Saharan Africa and their model concludes that FDI is inversely related to the prevalence of HIV/AIDS infection for a number of reasons; one of which is that workers that are healthy are more productive, multinational companies (MNCs) that seek to establish themselves in Sub-Saharan Africa would consider the health of the population. Health of the labour force is important because it effects absenteeism and thus overall productivity. Secondly, their model suggests that the negative externalities associated with HIV/AIDS (high morbidity and mortality rates which may affect coworkers that are not infected too). They find that reducing the infection rate will encourage FDI, and thus encourage economic development in Sub-Saharan Africa.

=== Remittances and Investment in Education (2015) ===
The paper "Remittances and Investment in Education: Evidence from Ghana" analyses remittances (both international and domestic) in Ghana, and how they affect the likelihood of enrolment in both primary and secondary education. Asiedu and Kwabena Gyimah-Brempong argue that the increase in remittances to less developed countries (LDCs) such as Ghana not only have a positive effect on the GDP (making up about 5.5% of Ghana's GDP in 2011), but this in turn allows for households in Ghana to invest in human capital as it eases financial constraints. Additionally, this paper argues that this effect is more observable when the household is headed by a female, and that the increase in investment in human capital allows for long term poverty alleviation in Ghana. The paper uses cross-sectional data from the Ghana Living Standards Survey (GLSS) from waves 5, as well as pseudo-panel data from GLSS waves 3-5 thus has a wide research base. Asiedu and Gyimah-Brempong use this data to analyze the data with the resource constraint model.

=== Foreign Direct Investment, Natural Resources, and Employment in Sub-Saharan Africa (2015) ===
In the paper "Foreign Direct Investment, Natural Resources, and Employment in Sub-Saharan Africa," Asiedu, Komla Dzigbede and Akwasi Nti-Addae explore the rise of oil production and in Sub-Saharan Africa and its effect on foreign direct investment FDI, they authors also question the impact of FDI in Sub-Saharan Africa. They suggest that although FDI may be a vital factor in aiding economic growth in Sub-Saharan Africa, this economic growth is mostly accrued by the employment created by multinational corporations (MNCs) as these companies usually pay their employees higher wages than domestic companies. The authors use Tullow Oil, plc as an example to show the region's growing share of world oil production as well as to explore the role of MNCs FDI in terms of development and economic growth in Sub-Saharan Africa. Furthermore, they emphasize that the propensity to encourage economic growth or development is highly dependent on the type of FDI - FDI in manufacturing creates more employment than FDI in extractive industries like oil. Additionally, the authors argue that the success of FDI is also dependent on other factors such as the education level in a given country, making it the much more difficult to truly benefit from FDI in just about any industry.

== Awards ==
- Kemper Teaching Award, 2008, the University of Kansas
- Byron Shutz Award for Excellence in Teaching, 2008, the University of Kansas
- Woman of Distinction Award, 2008, the University of Kansas
- Outstanding Woman Educator Award, 2003, the University of Kansas
- University of Illinois PanHellenic Council Teaching Award, 1996
- American Association of University Women (AAUW) Fellowship, 1995-1996
- Statistics for Social Science Research Network (SSRN) as of June 2017
- Emerging Scholar Award, 2007, awarded by Diverse: Issues in Higher Education. Nation-wide award, honors minority faculty in academia; 10 awards annually
- Fulbright Specialist Scholar List, November 2008 – Present
- Big XII Fellowship, August 2008-June 2009
