= Richard F. America Jr. =

American economist

- Born: Philadelphia, Pennsylvania

Academic background
- Education: Pennsylvania State University (BA); Harvard Business School (MBA)

Academic work
- Discipline: Industrial Economics, Labor Economics
- Institutions: McDonough School of Business; Haas School of Business

Richard F. America Jr is an American economist who is emeritus Professor of the Practice in the McDonough School of Business of Georgetown University. He was among the founders of the National Economic Association, and served as the Association's president in 1985. He was previously the associate director of Urban Programs at the University of California's Haas School of Business, a lecturer at Stanford Business School, and a Senior Program Manager in the U.S. Small Business Administration.

America was among the first economists to advocate for reparations to Black Americans.

== Selected works ==
- America, Richard F., ed. The wealth of races: The present value of benefits from past injustices. No. 132. Praeger, 1990.
- America, Richard F., and Bernard E. Anderson Moving ahead: Black managers in American business. McGraw-Hill, 1978.
- America, Richard F., ed. Philanthropy and economic development. United Nations Publications, 1995.
- America, Richard F. Paying the Social Debt: What White America Owes Black America. ABC-CLIO, 1993.
- America Jr, Richard F. "What Do You People Want?." Harvard Business Review 47, no. 2 (1969): 103–112.
