= James B. Stewart (economist) =

Professor of economics and African-American Studies

- Born: 1947 (age 78–79)

Academic background
- Education: Rose Hulman Institute of Technology (BA); Cleveland State University (MA); University of Notre Dame (PhD)

Academic work
- Discipline: Employment Relations; African American Studies; Management
- Institutions: Penn State University
- Awards: 2021 Samuel Z. Westerfield Award
- Website: https://ler.la.psu.edu/people/js8

James B. Stewart (born 1947) is an American economist who is professor emeritus of Labor and Employment Relations, African and African American Studies, and Management and Organization at Pennsylvania State University. In 2021, he was awarded the Samuel Z. Westerfield Award, the highest award of the National Economic Association.

== Education and early life ==
Stewart grew up in the Mt. Pleasant neighborhood of Cleveland, Ohio. He studied math at Rose Hulman Institute of Technology, where he was one of only 5 Black students in a student body of 1,000, and later earned a Ph.D. in economics from the University of Notre Dame.

== Career ==
Stewart taught at Penn State from 1980 to 2009, while writing or co-authoring 11 books and 65 articles in Economics and Black Studies. He is a past president of the National Economic Association, the National Council for Black Studies, and the Association for the Study of African American Life and History. He is a former editor of The Review of Black Political Economy.

=== Selected publications ===
- Darity Jr, William A., Patrick L. Mason, and James B. Stewart. "The economics of identity: the origin and persistence of racial identity norms." Journal of Economic Behavior & Organization 60, no. 3 (2006): 283–305.
- Clark, Paul F., James B. Stewart, and Darlene A. Clark. "The globalization of the labour market for health-care professionals." Int'l Lab. Rev. 145 (2006): 37.
- Alridge, Derrick P., and James B. Stewart. "Introduction: Hip hop in history: Past, present, and future." The Journal of African American History 90, no. 3 (2005): 190–195.
- Macpherson, David A., and James B. Stewart. "The effect of international competition on union and nonunion wages." ILR Review 43, no. 4 (1990): 434–446.
- Stewart, James B., and Thomas Hyclak. "An analysis of the earnings profiles of immigrants." The Review of Economics and Statistics (1984): 292–296.
