= Alfred Edwards =

Alfred Edwards may refer to:

- A. G. Edwards (bishop) (1848–1937), Archbishop of Wales
- Alfred Edwards (football executive) (1850–1923), co-founder and first elected president of Italian football club A.C. Milan
- Alfred Edwards (journalist) (1856–1914), journalist and press magnate
- Alfred Edwards (politician) (1888–1958), British Member of Parliament for Middlesbrough East, 1935–1950
- Alfred Edwards (footballer) (1889–1918), English centre half
- Alfred L. Edwards (1920–2007), American economist and business professor
