= Marcus Alexis =

American professor (1932–2009)

- Born: February 26, 1932
- Died: May 27, 2009 (aged 77)

Academic background
- Education: Brooklyn College (BA) Michigan State University (MA) University of Minnesota (PhD)

Academic work
- Discipline: Urban Economics, Labor Economics
- Institutions: Macalester College; DePaul University; University of Rochester; Northwestern University; University of Illinois at Chicago
- Awards: 1979 Samuel Z. Westerfield Award

Marcus Alexis (February 26, 1932 – May 27, 2009) was professor emeritus of management & strategy at the Northwestern University Kellogg School of Management. He was a former chairman of the Federal Reserve Bank of Chicago, and a commissioner with the Interstate Commerce Commission during the Carter Administration. He was the first African American to receive a Ph.D. in economics from the University of Minnesota in 1959 and was known for his work training and mentoring other African American Economists. He was awarded the Samuel Z. Westerfield Award by the National Economic Association in 1979, and was also awarded the Outstanding Achievement Award from the University of Minnesota and an Honorary Doctorate from Brooklyn College.

== Education and early life ==
Alexis was born February 26, 1932, in Brooklyn, New York, in a family of 7 children. He attended New York City Public Schools and Brooklyn College. He then studied finance at Michigan State University and earned a doctorate in economics at the University of Minnesota, completing post-doctoral work at Harvard University and the Massachusetts Institute of Technology.

== Career ==
Alexis taught at Macalester College, DePaul University, the University of Rochester, and both the economics department and the Kellogg School of Management at Northwestern University. His time at Northwestern University marked the end of twenty-nine years that he served in a variety of positions there, following which he retired in 2005. He also served as dean of the business college of the University of Illinois at Chicago.

He was among the founders of the Caucus of Black Economists in 1969, now the National Economic Association, and was the organization's first chair. He helped found the American Economic Association's summer program to prepare promising students from underrepresented groups for graduate programs in economics.

Alexis was also chair of the Federal Reserve Bank of Chicago and was a member of the Interstate Commerce Commission for two years under President Jimmy Carter, including serving as acting chair.

=== Selected works ===
- Alexis, Marcus, and Charles Z. Wilson. "Organizational decision making." (1967).
- Alexis, Marcus. "Some Negro-White differences in consumption." The American Journal of Economics and Sociology 21, no. 1 (1962): 11–28.
- Haines Jr, George H., Leonard S. Simon, and Marcus Alexis. "Maximum likelihood estimation of central-city food trading areas." Journal of marketing research 9, no. 2 (1972): 154–159.
- Alexis, Marcus. "A theory of labor market discrimination with interdependent utilities." The American Economic Review 63, no. 2 (1973): 296–302.
- Alexis, Marcus. "Assessing 50 years of African-American economic status, 1940-1990." The American economic review 88, no. 2 (1998): 368–375.
