= Olugbenga Ajilore =

American economist

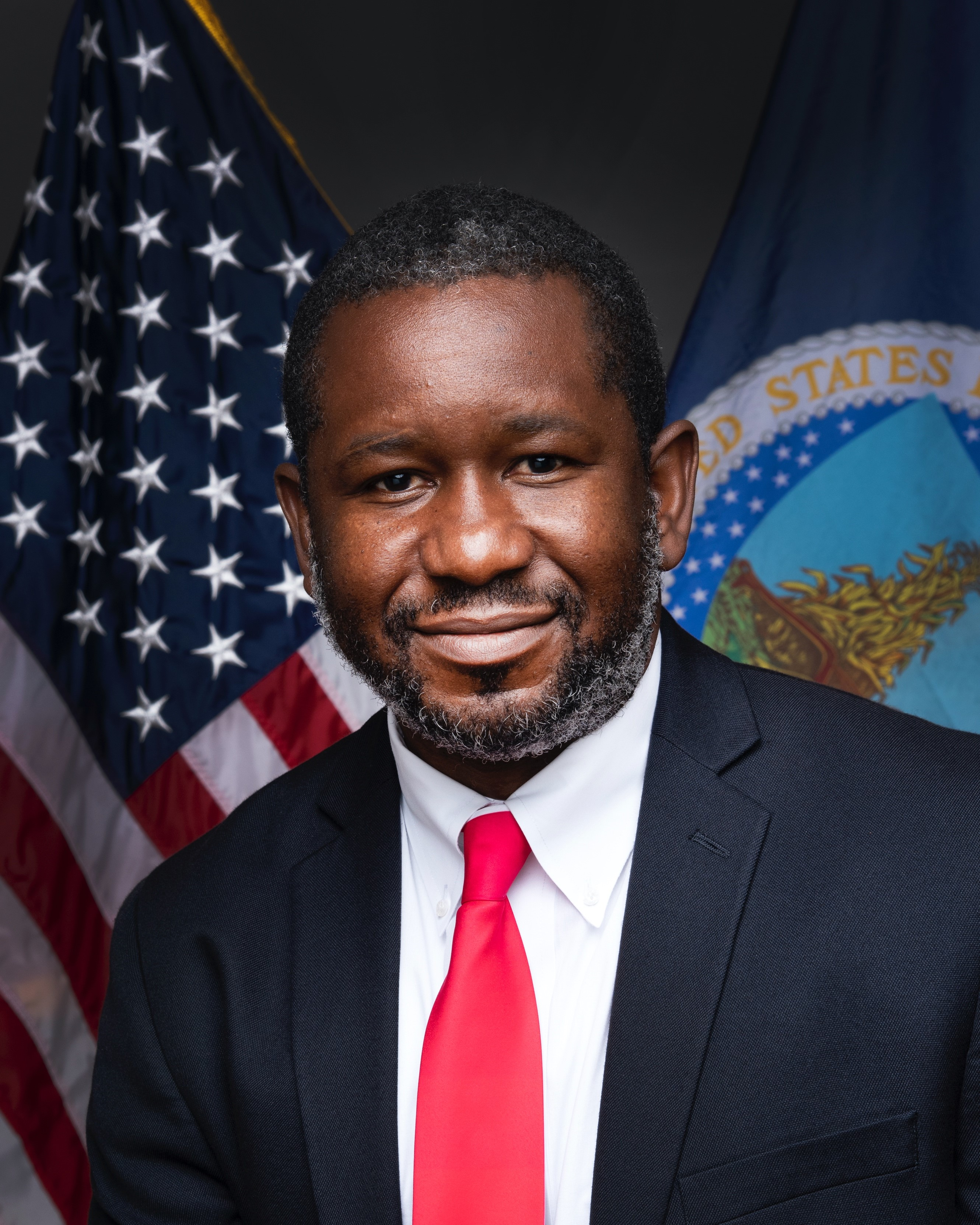

Academic background
- Education: University of California at Berkeley (BA) Claremont Graduate University (PhD)

Academic work
- Discipline: Public Finance, Economics of Crime, Economics of Rural Areas
- Institutions: Center on Budget and Policy Priorities; United States Department of Agriculture; Center for American Progress; Urban Institute; University of Toledo
- Website: https://www.cbpp.org/about/our-staff/gbenga-ajilore

Olugbenga "Gbenga" Ajilore (/ˈbɛŋɡə ˌædʒɪˈlɔːri/ BENG-gə AJ-il-OR-ee) is an American economist who is the Chief Economist at the Center on Budget and Policy Priorities. Previously, he served as a senior advisor in the Office of the Under Secretary for Rural Development at the United States Department of Agriculture. He has also been employed as a senior economist at the Center for American Progress and as an associate professor of economics at the University of Toledo. He is a past president of the National Economic Association and is a frequent media commentator on the labor market, particularly for Black Americans.

== Education and early life ==
Ajilore grew up in the city of Pasadena and attended Polytechnic School (California), where he was a recipient of the 2023 Distinguished Alumni Award, before earning a B.A. in applied mathematics and economics from the University of California at Berkeley and a PhD in economics from the Claremont Graduate University.

== Career ==
Ajilore was an assistant and associate professor at the University of Toledo from 2003 to 2018. During this period, he conducted research on tax policy and peer social networks, as well as racial bias and policing, particularly the use of lethal and nonlethal physical force by police and police militarization. Since joining the Center for American Progress in 2018, much of his work has focused on the economy of rural America. In 2022, Ajilore was involved in establishing the USDA Equity Commission under the Biden-Harris administration to address inequalities in agriculture, such as the racial wealth gap. Ajilore has most recently served as a senior advisor at the United States Department of Agriculture in the Office of the Undersecretary for Rural Development.

=== Selected research publications ===
- Ajilore, Olugbenga. "The militarization of local law enforcement: is race a factor?." Applied Economics Letters 22, no. 13 (2015): 1089–1093.
- Ali, Mir M., and Olugbenga Ajilore. "Can marriage reduce risky health behavior for African-Americans?." Journal of Family and Economic Issues 32, no. 2 (2011): 191–203.
- Ajilore, Olugbenga, and John Smith. "Ethnic fragmentation and police spending." Applied Economics Letters 18, no. 4 (2011): 329–332.
- Ajilore, Olugbenga, Aliaksandr Amialchuk, and Keven Egan. "Alcohol consumption by youth: peers, parents, or prices?." Economics & Human Biology 23 (2016): 76–83.
- Ajilore, Olugbenga. "Identifying peer effects using spatial analysis: the role of peers on risky sexual behavior." Review of Economics of the Household 13, no. 3 (2015): 635–652.
- Ajilore, Olugbenga. "Do White NBA Players Suffer from Reverse Discrimination?" Economics Bulletin, Vol. 34 No. 1 pp. 558–566
- Ajilore, Olugbenga. "On the persistence of the Black-White unemployment gap." Center for American Progress.
