= Trevon Logan =

American economist

Trevon D. Logan
- Born: St. Paul, Minnesota, United States

Academic background
- Education: University of Wisconsin, Madison; University of California, Berkeley
- Doctoral advisor: Ronald Lee

Academic work
- Discipline: Economics; Economic History
- Institutions: Ohio State University; University of California, Santa Barbara
- Website: https://economics.osu.edu/people/logan.155

Trevon D'Marcus Logan is an American economist. He is the Hazel C. Youngberg Trustees Distinguished Professor in the Department of Economics and Associate Dean of the College of Arts and Sciences at Ohio State University, where he was awarded the 2014 Alumni Award for Distinguished Teaching. He is also a research associate at the National Bureau of Economic Research. In 2014, he was the youngest-ever president of the National Economic Association. In 2019, he was the inaugural North Hall Economics Professor at the University of California, Santa Barbara. In 2020, he was named the inaugural director of the National Bureau of Economic Research Working Group on Race and Stratification in the Economy. His research mainly focuses on economic history, including studies of African American migration, economic analysis of illegal markets, the economics of marriage transfers, and measures of historical living standards, with an emphasis on racial disparities in the United States.

== Life ==
Logan comes from an African-American family in St. Paul, Minnesota, with roots in the sharecropping economy of the southern United States. He received his B.S. in economics from the University of Wisconsin, Madison in 1999 as a Chancellor's Scholar, M.A. degrees in economics and demography from the University of California, Berkeley in 2003, and his PhD in economics from the University of California, Berkeley in 2004. He was awarded tenure as a professor of economics at The Ohio State University at the age of 32. He has held visiting positions at Princeton University's Center for Health and Well-Being and was a Robert Wood Johnson Foundation Scholar in Health Policy Research at the University of Michigan. Outside of his university positions, he serves on the board of a network of charter schools, and is active in Columbus-area HIV prevention organizations.

== Research ==
Logan specializes in economic history, economic demography and applied microeconomics.

His research in economic history concerns the development of living standards measures to assess how the human condition has changed over time. He applies techniques of contemporary living standard measurements to the past to derive consistent estimates of well-being over time. Much of his historical work uses historical household surveys, but also includes some new data to examine area such as the returns to education in the early twentieth century, the formation of tastes, and the allocation of resources within the household. In work with John Parman, he showed that there was an increase in racial segregation in all areas of the United States from 1880 to 1940—including in rural areas. In a series of recent papers, he has studied the impact of Black politicians on the distribution of public finance and subsequent violence, and disparate access to Union Army pensions during the Reconstruction era.

In his presidential address to the NEA, Logan used records from his own family to talk about productivity and living standards in the Jim crow era in the American South, arguing for a greater role of qualitative research in driving the focus of empirical study.

His economic demography research agenda includes a variety of projects. In one project, with Raj Arunachalam, he examines dowries in South Asia to see if the purpose of dowry has changed over time. In another project, with Manisha Shah and Chih-Sheng Hsieh, he studies the economic, social and health implications of male sex work. This work examines the value of information in this illegal market, uses econometric techniques to quantitatively test sociological theories of gender and masculinity, and looks at the role of public health in causing decreases in disease transmission among these men. Logan has also worked on the economics of sports with Rodney J. Andrews, Kyle J. Kain, and Michael J. Sinkey. He has looked at bias in the college football betting market, deriving stronger tests for the use of the betting market as a prediction market, and testing for behavioral biases in college football poll rankings.

=== Selected works ===
- Logan, Trevon D.; John M. Parman (2017). "The national rise in residential segregation". The Journal of Economic History. 77 (1): 127–170. doi:10.1017/S0022050717000079.
- Cook, Lisa D.; Trevon D. Logan; John M. Parman (2018). "Racial segregation and southern lynching". Social Science History. 42 (4): 635–675. doi:10.1017/ssh.2018.21. JSTOR 90025651.
- Logan, Trevon D. (2010). "Personal characteristics, sexual behaviors, and male sex work: A quantitative approach". American Sociological Review. 75 (5): 679–704. doi:10.1177/0003122410379581. S2CID 145533019.
- Logan, Trevon D (2009). "The transformation of hunger: The demand for calories past and present" (PDF). The Journal of Economic History. 69 (2): 388–408. doi:10.1017/S0022050709000825. S2CID 158675169.
- Andrews, Rodney J.; Trevon D. Logan (2010). "Family health, children's own health, and test score gaps". American Economic Review: Papers and Proceedings. 100 (2): 195–99. doi:10.1257/aer.100.2.195. PMID 29508980.
