= Flournoy Coles =

Professor of economics

- Born: c. 1915; Trenton, New Jersey
- Died: August 1, 1982; Washington, D.C.

Academic background
- Education: Xavier University; University of Pennsylvania (MA); Wharton School (PhD)

Flournoy A. Coles Jr. (c. 1915 – August 1, 1982) was an official of the United States Department of State and a professor at Vanderbilt University's Owen Graduate School of Management. He was the first Black faculty member to gain tenure at Vanderbilt University.

== Early life and education ==
Coles was born in Trenton, New Jersey. He was a graduate of Xavier University and the University of Pennsylvania, where he earned a doctorate in economics at the Wharton School of Business. He served in the U.S. Army during World War II.

== Career ==
Coles was an economist with the State Department from 1951 to 1963, serving in posts in Europe and Asia. In 1967, he became the chair of the economics department at Fisk University in Nashville, TN, and in 1969, he was hired as a tenured faculty member at Vanderbilt University. He was a president of the National Economic Association.

=== Selected works ===
- Coles, Flournoy A. Black economic development. Burnham Incorporated Pub, 1975.
- Coles, Flournoy A. An analysis of black entrepreneurship in seven urban areas. National Business League, 1969.
- Coles, Flournoy. "Recommendations from Nashville Conference on Economic Curriculum in Black Colleges." The American Economic Review 60, no. 2 (1970): 412-415.
- Coles Jr, Flournoy A. "The Unique Problems of the Black Businessman." Vand. L. Rev. 26 (1973): 509.
- Coles Jr, Flournoy A. "Financial Institutions and Black Entrepreneurship." Journal of Black Studies 3, no. 3 (1973): 329-349.
- Coles Jr, Flournoy A. "Rethinking economic development." The Review of Black Political Economy 11, no. 2 (1981): 277-281.
