= Valerie Rawlston Wilson =

American economist

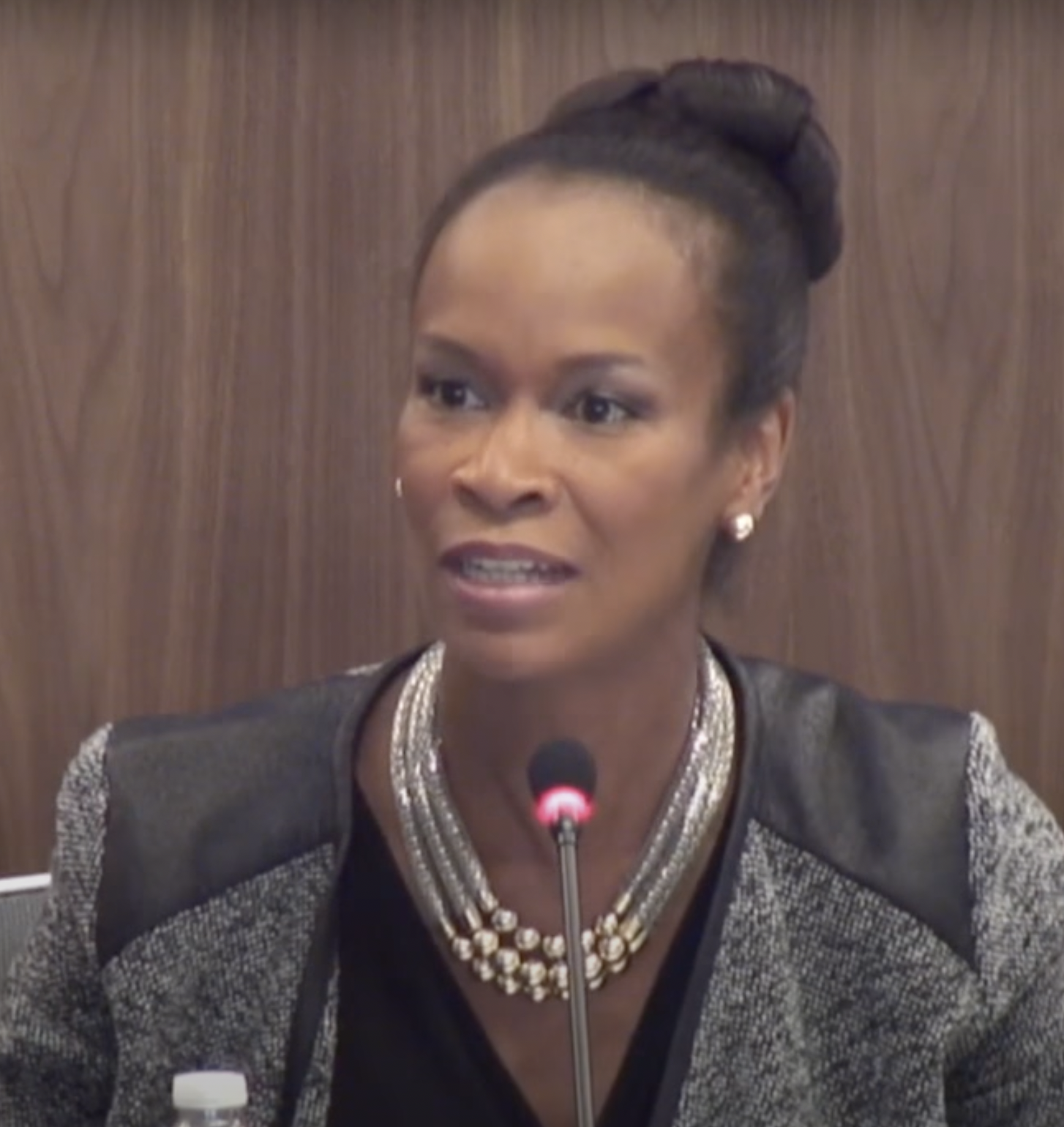
- Wilson in 2016

Academic background
- Education: Hampton University, B.A., Economics (1997); University of North Carolina at Chapel Hill, PhD, Economics (2006)
- Doctoral advisor: Wilbert van der Klaauw

Academic work
- Discipline: Labor Economics
- Institutions: Economic Policy Institute; National Urban League
- Website: EPI website profile

Valerie Rawlston Wilson is an American labor economist who directs the Economic Policy Institute’s Program on Race, Ethnicity, and the Economy. She researches and writes about economic inequality in the United States in employment and training, income and wealth disparities, access to higher education, and social insurance.

She was previously vice president of research at the National Urban League Washington Bureau. In June 2022, she testified before the United States Congressional Committee on Education and Labor on how COVID-19 widened racial inequities in education, health, and the workforce. She was the 2022 president of the National Economic Association.

Wilson attended Hampton University and earned a PhD in economics from the University of North Carolina at Chapel Hill.

== Selected works ==
- Wilson, Valerie Rawlston. "The effect of attending an HBCU on persistence and graduation outcomes of African-American college students." The Review of Black Political Economy 34, no. 1-2 (2007): 11–52.
- Rawlston-Wilson, Valerie, Susie Saavedra, and Shree Chauhan. "From access to completion: A seamless path to college graduation for African American students." (2014).
- Wilson, Valerie Rawlston, and Renee R. Hanson. "Effective policies for promoting early behavioral development." Harvard Journal Of African American Public Policy (2009): 1555–66.
- Gould, Elise Lorraine, and Valerie Rawlston-Wilson. Black Workers Face Two of the Most Lethal Preexisting Conditions for Coronavirus—racism and Economic Inequality: Report. Economic Policy Institute, 2020.
- Wilson, Valerie Rawlston. "African Americans & the Green Revolution: A Report from the National Urban League Policy Institute."
