= Cecilia Conrad =

American professor

- Born: 4 January 1955 (age 71); St. Louis, Missouri
- Spouse: Llewellyn Miller

Academic background
- Education: Wellesley College; Stanford University

Academic work
- Discipline: Feminist Economics
- Institutions: MacArthur Foundation; Lever for Change
- Doctoral students: Rhonda Vonshay Sharpe
- Awards: Samuel Z. Westerfield Award (2018); Woman of Power Award, 2008; Outstanding Academic Title, 2005; Wig Distinguished Professorship Award for Excellence in Teaching (2002); Carnegie Professor of the Year (2002)

Cecilia Ann Conrad (born 4 January 1955) is the CEO of Lever for Change, emeritus professor of economics at Pomona College, and a senior advisor to the John D. and Catherine T. MacArthur Foundation. She formerly served as the Associate Dean of Academic Affairs at Pomona College and previously oversaw the foundation's MacArthur Fellows and 100&Change programs as managing director. She holds a B.A. Wellesley College and a Ph.D. in economics from Stanford University. Her research focuses on the effects of race and gender on economic status.

== Early life ==
Cecilia Conrad was born on January 4, 1955, in St. Louis, Missouri. Her parents, Emmett James Conrad and Eleanor Nelson Conrad, moved to Dallas after her father became the first African American surgeon to join the staff of St. Paul's Hospital, Dallas, Texas (now St. Paul University Hospital, University of Texas Southwestern). Dr. Emmett Conrad was appointed to the Texas State Board of Education by Governor Mark White in 1984, the first African American elected to a citywide office in Dallas. Eleanor Conrad acted as his campaign manager. Cecilia was their only child.

== Education ==
Conrad says evening news coverage of the Vietnam War, Civil Rights Movement, and the international monetary system sparked her interest in economics. She credits her high school math teacher with helping her further this interest by helping her participate in a NSF sponsored summer math program where she learned number theory, matrix algebra, Fortran, and symbolic logic.

Conrad graduated from Wellesley College in 1976 with a degree in economics. She received her master's and doctorate in labor economics, industrial organization, and public finance from Stanford University in 1982. Also during this time, Conrad was a fellow in the Bell Laboratories Cooperative Research program, an affirmative action effort to increase the pool of women and minorities with doctoral degrees who might become future employees. She also worked as an economist at the Federal Trade Commission, Bureau of Economics, Economic Evidence Division.

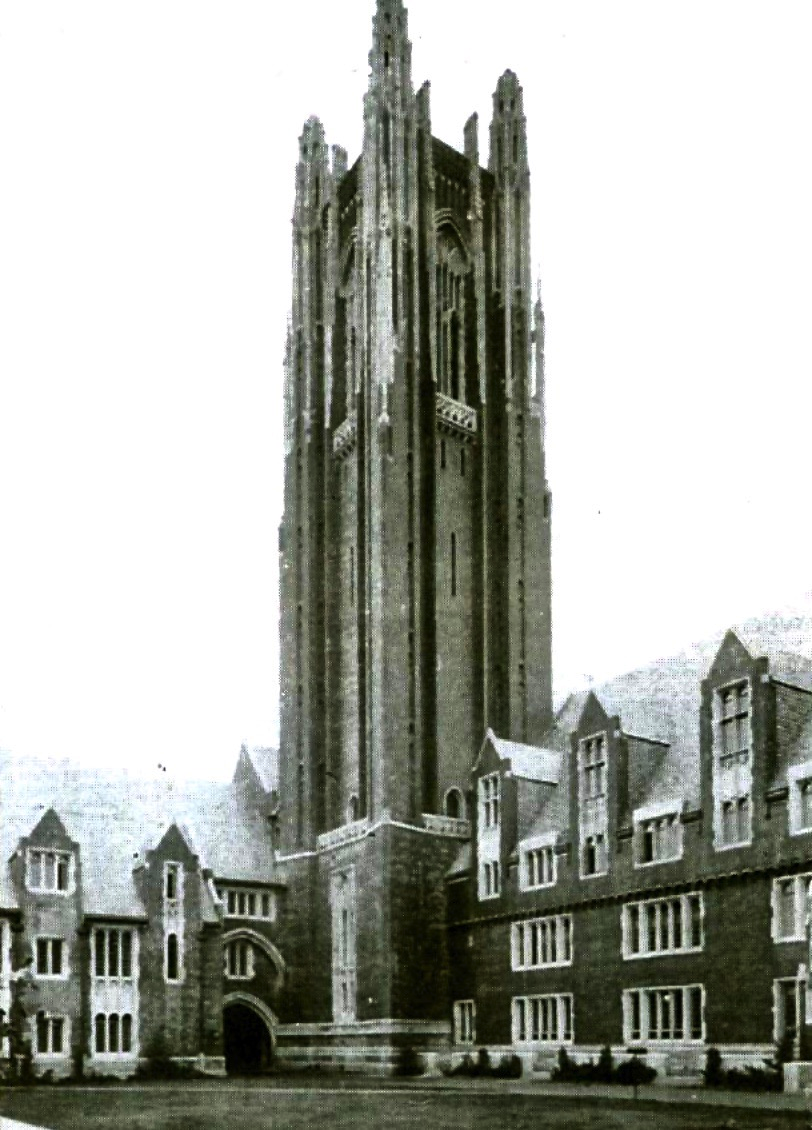
Wellesley College, Massachusetts. Conrad's alma mater

She holds honorary doctorates from both Claremont Graduate University and the University of Massachusetts Dartmouth.

== Career ==
While still attending Stanford, Conrad worked as an economist at the Federal Trade Commission, Bureau of Economics, Economic Evidence Division. She taught at Barnard College and Duke University after graduating.

In 1995, Conrad joined the faculty at Pomona College where she served various roles including the Stedman Sumner Chair in Economics. In 2002, she was awarded California's Carnegie Professor of the Year. Conrad also served as Associate Dean of Academic Affairs at Pomona from 2004 to 2007, during which she expanded the summer undergraduate research program to embrace a humanities and liberal arts style education. She used her administrative position to advocate for better diversity and inclusivity on campus.

Conrad served as interim Dean of Faculty at Scripps College from 2007 to 2009. During this time, Conrad also served as president of the International Association for Feminist Economics (IAFFE), president of the National Economic Association, and on the board of the American Economic Association's Committee on the Status of Women in the Economics Profession (CSWEP).

In 2009, Conrad returned to Pomona and took the position of Vice President for Academic Affairs and Dean of the college, which she held until 2012. In the fall of 2012 and for that academic year, Conrad also served as Acting President.

In 2010, Conrad joined the National Science Foundation's Committee on Equal Opportunities in Science and Engineering (CEOSE), where she served as Vice Chair from 2011 to 2012 and chair from 2012–present.

Conrad left her position at Pomona in January 2013, when she was asked to serve as managing director for the MacArthur Foundation. There, she managed the MacArthur Fellows program as well as 100&Change, two programs that provide sizable grants to "extraordinarily creative and inspiring individuals." Conrad is the CEO of Lever for Change, which is a nonprofit affiliate of the MacArthur Foundation. This organization works specifically to make philanthropic resources available for the benefit of social change.

Conrad is a member of the Board of Trustees of Bryn Mawr College, the National Academy of Social Insurance, and Muhlenberg College. She was a board member of the Poetry Foundation. She is also an editor of The Review of Black Political Economy and on the editorial board of Feminist Economics.

== Awards and honors ==
- 2018, Samuel Z. Westerfield Award, awarded by the National Economic Association
- 2008, Woman of Power Award annual conference of the National Urban League
- 2005, Outstanding Academic Title for African Americans in the U.S. Economy, awarded by Choice Magazine
- 2002, Carnegie Professor of the Year
- 2002, Wig Distinguished Professorship Award for Excellence in Teaching, awarded by Pomona College

== Selected works ==
=== Books ===
- Conrad, Cecilia A (2004). Building skills for black workers: preparing for the future labor market. Washington, D.C. Lanham, Maryland: Joint Center for Political and Economic Studies University Press of America. ISBN 9780761827795.
- Conrad, Cecilia A; Whitehead, John; Mason, Patrick; Stewart, James (2005). African Americans in the U.S. economy. Lanham, Maryland: Rowman & Littlefield. ISBN 9780742543782.
- Conrad, Cecilia A (1999), "Affirmative action and admission to the University of California", in Ong, Paul (ed.), Impacts of affirmative action: policies and consequences in California, Walnut Creek, California: AltaMira Press, pp. 171–196, ISBN 9780761990550
- Conrad, Cecilia A (2018). “Feminist Economics: Second Wave, Tidal Wave, or Barely a Ripple?” Chapter in edited volume The Legacy of 2nd Wave Feminism in American Politics, edited by Angie Maxwell and Todd Shields, Palgrave MacMillan.

=== Research articles ===
- Conrad, Cecilia A; Doss, Cheryl R. (2008). "The AIDS epidemic: challenges for feminist economics". Feminist Economics. 14 (3): 1–18. doi:10.1080/13545700802262998. S2CID 154087410.
- Conrad, Cecilia A; Dixson, Adrienne; Sloan Green, Clementine "Tina" (2014). “A Discussion on Gender Equity and Women of Color,” Frontiers: A Journal of Women Studies, Vol 35, #3: pp 3–14.
- Conrad, Cecilia A (Fall 2014). "Finding the right match" (PDF). CSWEP Newsletter: 5–8. Archived from the original (PDF) on 2015-04-13.
- Conrad, Cecilia A (2018). “How to Mobilize Philanthropy to Advance Racial Equity? A Call to Action,” The Review of Black Political Economy, Vol. 45, #2: pp 95–103.
- Conrad, Cecilia A (August 6, 2019). "Big Grant, Big Learnings,” India Development Review.
- Conrad, Cecilia A; Bloom, David E; Miller, Cynthia K (1996). Child support and fathers' remarriage and fertility. Cambridge Mass: Volume 5781 of National Bureau of Economic Research NBER working paper series (original from: University of Michigan).

== Additional appearances ==
- Conrad, Cecilia A (September 3, 2014). “The Geography of Genius: New Data About MacArthur Fellows Shows That Creative People Move More,” Time.
- Conrad, Cecilia A (September 16, 2013). “Our Society Discourages Innovation,” Op-Ed, Room for Debate, The New York Times.
- Conrad, Cecilia A (September 20, 2013). “Five Myths About the MacArthur ‘Genius Grants’,” The Washington Post.
- Conrad, Cecilia A (September 26, 2017). “Giving Away $100 Million: A Peek behind the Curtain at MacArthur Foundation,” Nonprofit Quarterly.
- Interview with Priss Benbow, Stanford Social Innovation Review podcast, “MacArthur Foundation Program Leader Reflects on Lessons From 100&Change Grant Competition” April 23, 2019.
- Is there a bubble in the liberal arts college market? (transcription), Pomona College Vice President and Dean of the college, Cecilia Conrad, speech at the 1 September 2009 Convocation.

== See also ==
- Feminist economics
- List of feminist economists

Non-profit organisation positions
Preceded by Martha MacDonald	President of the International Association for Feminist Economics; 2008–2009	Succeeded by Susan Himmelweit
