= Samuel L. Myers Sr. =

American economist (1919–2021)

- Born: April 18, 1919; Baltimore, Maryland, U.S.
- Died: January 8, 2021 (aged 101)

Academic background
- Education: Morgan State University; Boston University; Harvard University
- Influences: John Kenneth Galbraith

Academic work
- Discipline: Economics
- Notable ideas: Consumer protection
- Awards: Samuel Z. Westerfield Award, 1994

Samuel Lloyd Myers Sr. (April 18, 1919 – January 8, 2021) was an American economist, university president, education adviser and civil rights advocate. One of Myers' most significant contributions to society occurred during his 18-year tenure as the president of the National Association for Equal Opportunity (NAFEO) where he fought to sustain the establishment of historically black colleges by providing them access to a billion dollars of federal aid.

== Early life and education ==
Samuel Myers was born in Baltimore, Maryland, in April 1919, to David and Edith Myers, Jamaican immigrants. Myers attended Fredrick Douglas High School, which was segregated but renowned, where he graduated in 1936. During his time there, he was the editor of the school newspaper, a varsity football player, and participant on the debate team. Myers attended Morgan State College where he planned on majoring in chemistry. Upon taking a semester to travel and work, he was impacted by the overwhelming disparities, specifically in poverty, that he witnessed on his travels. Upon returning to college, he concluded that his focus would be in the social sciences and committed his education and life's work to combat these issues.

After graduating from Morgan State with a B.A. in social sciences, Myers enrolled at Boston University, where he attained an M.A. degree in economics, writing a thesis titled "Consumers' Cooperation: A Plan for the Negro". His thesis speaks to the lack of successful cooperatives in the United States compared to European nations, and more so the lack of local Negro cooperatives. Myers speaks of the benefit of cooperatives to African Americans in the long run in ways of increased consumer bargaining power and concerted action power. The thesis illustrates the plan as a social economic salvation for African Americans, which is also noted in Jessica Gordon Nembhard's book Collective Courage: A History of African American Cooperative Economic Thought and Preface.

After graduation, Myers was drafted into the Army and was stationed in a training school at Camp Lee, Alabama. Despite eventually rising to the rank of captain, he faced racial discrimination, which was still very present in the Army during this period. He and other black soldiers were often subject to cleaning the barracks of white soldiers. At one point, Myers was nearly court marshaled after protesting the exclusion of black officers from the general officers' club. He was later stationed in Okinawa, Japan, where he guarded Japanese prisoners of war.

After the war, Myers went on to pursue his doctorate degree in economics at Harvard University. He was a recipient of the coveted Julius Rosenwald Fellowship, which assisted him in completing his doctorate in 1949. At Harvard, Myers studied under famous economists such as John D. Black, Sumner Slichter, Gottfried Haberler, and Joseph Schumpeter.

John Kenneth Gabraith was his advisor as he worked on completing his Ph.D. thesis, titled "Product Testing and Labeling with Special References to Textiles". The dissertation focuses on the exploitation of consumers through marketing techniques in order to attain the highest revenues. The main focus of the thesis was on the production, distribution, consumption, and protection of the consumer. Myers was one of the first African Americans to receive a Ph.D. in economics from Harvard University.

== Professional career ==
Through his relationship with and tutelage under John D. Black, Myers was exposed to numerous governmental positions. In April 1950, he was hired as a research economist for the Bureau of Labor Statistics at the U.S. Department of Labor. Shortly thereafter, he concluded his track in that department and became a professor at Morgan State University, his alma mater. There, he taught economics, was the chair of the Social Science Department, and taught many distinguished students such as Earl Graves, Sr., the founder of Black Enterprise.

From 1963 to 1967, Myers returned to the public sector, working as an adviser for the Inter-American Affairs in the U.S. State Department.

In 1967, he became the president of Bowie State University. During his term, Myers was known as a strong advocate of success in the classroom and rewarded such success with presidential recognition. As the new leader of Bowie, he increased and expanded the university's curriculum, and increased student enrollment. He left Bowie State in 1977, accepting the chair position of the National Association for Equal Opportunity in Higher Education. In 1998, he served as the Chairman of Minority Access Incorporated, which works to diversify campuses and corporate work sites.

=== The 1968 Bowie State protests ===
Taking a pay cut and leaving the state department, Myers accepted a position as the president of Bowie State in 1967. The students of the university held that Bowie lacked a curriculum on African American history, and that it failed to provide adequate dormitory accommodations. In short, the students were seeking overall education reform. For the students, the issue did not lie in the administration of the school, but in the state government and its consistent lack of attention to their needs. Governor Spiro T. Agnew, along with his education official, refused to meet with or listen to the students. Instead, Agnew provided ultimatums to the students, ordering them to vacate the buildings or be met with force. However, Myers was able to calm the students, bringing their focus back on education. Myers' wife Marion is also credited with being a critical figure in subduing the tensions of students. She aided in the positive image of her husband as she spoke with the students in the midst of protests. She invited them to her and her husband's campus home, often late at night, and gave them home cooked meals. With only a few students arrested in the midst of the protests, the riots for the most part worked in favor of the students. The protests received national attention, provoking a visit to the school from Attorney General Francis B. Burch, during which he confirmed the inadequate conditions of several facilities. In early April 1968, the school protests ended.

=== National Association for Equal Opportunity in Higher Education ===
After retiring from Bowie State College in 1977, Myers was named president of the National Association for Equal Opportunity in Higher Education (NAFEO). NAFEO was founded in 1969 in Washington D.C., and its mission was to represent historically black colleges and universities (HBCUs) across the nation in higher education. Myers spent the next 18 years as the president, the longest term in the organization's history. While in office, Myers became NAFEO's second leader, working instrumentally to stabilize its finances and counsel current leaders of the represented black colleges. During this period, the organization oversaw 117 black colleges and universities. NAFEO helped them fight an upheaval of minimum funding due to a lack of endowments, especially during tough economic times. NAFEO also focused on empowering black students. The need to provide career opportunities to hardworking, intelligent black students was clear to Myers and the organization.

In the fall of November 1984, NAFEO held a reception announcing the plan to introduce one hundred corporations to its own Student Talent Identification Bank. With this, the organization could pair the brightest, most motivated students in black colleges and universities with top executives from corporations around the world. This effort saw great fulfillment as many students took on the opportunity, and further down the road were continuously recognized at the annual National Conference on Blacks in Higher Education.

In the late 1970s and early 1980s, enrollment was decreasing at black colleges and universities, and funding was an undeniable problem. When Myers took office at NAFEO, the U.S. government was in the midst of deciding whether to sustain funding for these institutions. Much of the country's focus was on establishing and increasing the prestige of "white, Ivy League and research institutions". The lack of education about and focus on HBCUs was leading the institutions on a path of deterioration. In the 1960s, as the integration of segregated schools occurred, the perception was that black institutions were no longer necessary. As Myers explains it, the feeling was that "there was no longer a need for Black Colleges". Therefore, allocating federal aid to these institutions was thought of as unnecessary. Furthermore, during this period there were no committed individuals who had the influence or the funds to help support and maintain historically black colleges. As the president of NAFEO, Myers' solution was to push the federal government to realize the need to sustain these institutions and provide the necessary funding. By hiring the attorney support of Kenneth S. Tollett Sr. and William Blakey, along with gaining the support and aid of influential higher education associations, NAFEO's press on the U.S. Federal Government became indubitably strong. With this front, Myers and his team were able to persuade President Jimmy Carter to pour a billion dollars into historically black colleges and universities, and lobby Congress to pass what is now known as the Higher Education Act Title III.

== Personal ==
Myers lived in Bethesda, Maryland. He and his wife Marion had three adult children, Samuel Myers, Jr, Yvette Myers, and Judge Tama Rose Myers Clark. Myers was a lifetime member of Alpha Phi Alpha fraternity.

== Honors and awards ==
- 1948, Julius Rosenwald Fellowship
- 1994, National Economic Association’s Samuel Z. Westerfield Award
- Commandeur de L'Ordre National de Cote d Ivoire
- Gold Standard for members of Sigma Pi Phi

== Publications ==
- Consumers Cooperation. Myers. Thesis. Masters of Arts 1940.
- Product Testing and Labeling with special Reference to Textiles. Doctorate Dissertation. 1949.
- Textile and Apparel Testing and Labeling. Harvard Studies in Marketing, Farm Products.1954
- Economic Issues and Black Colleges. 1986.
- Dissertation in Higher Education. 1989.
- "The Evolving Face of Capitalism and prospects for Black Economic Empowerment." The Review of Black Political Economy. 1994.
- "Understanding Consumer Behavior." Journal of Marketing Research. A book review. 1964.
