= Charles Wilson (economist) =

American economist

Charles Z. Wilson

Academic background
- Education: University of Illinois

Academic work
- Discipline: Education Economics
- Institutions: University of California, Los Angeles; SUNY-Binghamton; DePaul University
- Website: http://www.czandcons.com/

Charles Zachary Wilson is an American economist who is professor emeritus at UCLA's Graduate School of Education. He was the first Black individual to serve as an Academic Vice-Chancellor in the University of California System, and was among the founders of the National Economic Association.

== Education and early life ==
Born in the Mississippi Delta, Wilson earned a B.S. (1952) and PhD (1956) in Economics and Statistics from the University of Illinois, completed post-doctoral training in Engineering Economics at the Illinois Institute of Technology in 1959, and later trained in Family Counseling at California State University, Northridge and Management for Entrepreneurs at UCLA.

== Career ==
Wilson taught at DePaul University's School of Business and then at SUNY-Binghamton, where he became the first Black full professor on that faculty. He joined UCLA in 1968 as a professor in the Graduate School of Education. In 1970, he became Vice-Chancellor of Academic Programs, where he served until 1984. From 1985 to 1996 he was Publisher of Central News-Wave Publications, Inc, one of the largest black newspapers in the United States.

=== Selected works ===
- Wilson, Charles Z., and Marcus Alexis. "Basic frameworks for decisions." Academy of Management Journal 5, no. 2 (1962): 150–164.
- Alexis, Marcus, Thaddeus Spratlen, and Charles Z. Wilson. "Robert Browne and the Caucus of black economics." The Review of Black Political Economy 35, no. 2-3 (2008): 61–66.
- Wilson, Charles Z. "Organization Theory: A Survey of Three Views." The Quarterly Review of Economics and Business 1 (1961).
- Wilson, Charles Z., and Marcus Alexis. "Organizational Decision-Making"
- Wilson, Charles Z., "Crossing Organizational Boundaries By Choice"
