= Nina Banks =

American economist

Academic background
- Education: Hood College, B.A. University of Massachusetts Amherst, PhD., Economics (1999)

Academic work
- Discipline: History of Economics
- Institutions: Bucknell University
- Website: www.bucknell.edu/fac-staff/nina-banks%20profile

Nina Banks is an American economist who is an associate professor of economics at Bucknell University and former president of the National Economic Association. She previously served on the board of the International Association for Feminist Economics (IAFFE) and is part of the editorial boards of the journals Feminist Economics and The Review of Black Political Economy. She also currently serves on the Board of Directors of the Economic Policy Institute (EPI). She is known for her research on the contributions of early women economists, particularly Sadie Tanner Mossell Alexander. She is one of the founders of the Freedom and Justice conference of NEA and ASHE. She has also published work explaining the economic value of Black women's community activism. Nina Banks, having seen a historic view on “…the first Black person to attain a doctorate degree in economics, in 1921” had become captivated by her, creating a biography for Sadie.

At an early age, Nina Banks noticed the economic inequalities that were prominent in her home town in Pennsylvania. She works through the means of economics rather than humanities to highlight the foundations of racial inequalities that she experienced.

== Selected works ==
- Banks, Nina. "Democracy, Race, And Justice: The Speeches And Writing Of Sadie T. M. Alexander." Yale University Press, 2021
- Banks, Nina, Geoffrey Schneider, and Paul Susman. "Paying the bills is not just theory: service learning about a living wage." Review of Radical Political Economics 37, no. 3 (2005): 346–356.
- Banks, Nina. "Uplifting The Race Through Domesticity: Capitalism, African-American Migration, And The Household Economy In The Great Migration Era Of 1916—1930." Feminist Economics 12, no. 4 (2006): 599–624.
- Banks, Nina. "Black women and racial advancement: The economics of Sadie Tanner Mossell Alexander." The Review of Black Political Economy 33, no. 1 (2005): 9-24.
- Banks, Nina. "The Black worker, economic justice and the speeches of Sadie TM Alexander." Review of Social Economy 66, no. 2 (2008): 139–161.
