= Charles L. Betsey =

Professor of economics

Academic background
- Education: University of Michigan (PhD), 1976; (BA), 1968

Academic work
- Discipline: Labor Economics; Public Finance
- Institutions: Howard University; United States Sentencing Commission; National Research Council; University of the District of Columbia; Office of Economic Opportunity

Charles L. Betsey is an American economist who is professor emeritus of Economics and Former Interim Dean of the Graduate School at Howard University. He is a former president of the National Economic Association.

== Education and early life ==
Betsey graduated from the University of Michigan in 1968 with an A.B. in Economics and Spanish Literature and a PhD in economics in 1976.

== Career ==
Betsey worked as an economist for several U.S. government agencies, including the Equal Employment Opportunity Commission, the United States Department of Labor, and the Congressional Budget Office. He has taught at the University of the District of Columbia, and from 1990 until his retirement, at Howard University. He is a member of the National Academy of Social Insurance.

=== Selected publications ===
- Betsey, Charles L., ed. Historically black colleges and universities. Vol. 1. Transaction Publishers, 2011.
- Moore, Kristin A., Margaret C. Simms, and Charles L. Betsey. Choice and circumstance: Racial differences in adolescent sexuality and fertility. Transaction Publishers, 1986.
- Betsey, Charles L., and Bruce H. Dunson. "Federal minimum wage laws and the employment of minority youth." The American Economic Review 71, no. 2 (1981): 379–384.
- Betsey, Charles L. "Faculty research productivity: Institutional and personal determinants of faculty publications." The Review of Black Political Economy 34, no. 1-2 (2007): 53–85.
- Betsey, Charles L. "Differences in unemployment experience between blacks and whites." The American Economic Review 68, no. 2 (1978): 192–197.
