= Alfred E. Osborne =

American economist

Alfred E. Osborne Jr.
- Born: Panama City

Academic background
- Education: Stanford University (BS), 1968; (MA), 1971; (MBA), 1971; (PhD) 1974

Alfred E. Osborne Jr is an American economist who is senior associate dean, Professor of Global Economics, Management and Entrepreneurship, and founder and faculty director of The Harold and Pauline Price Center for Entrepreneurial Studies at UCLA Anderson School of Management. He is also chair of the Board of Trustees of Fidelity Charitable, and is a former president of the National Economic Association.

== Education and early life ==
Osborne was raised in the Panama Canal Zone, and came to the US to study electrical engineering at Stanford University. After working briefly as an engineer, he returned to Stanford to study economics and business, earning an MA in economics, and MBA in finance, and a PhD in Business Economics in 1974.

== Career ==
Osborne began teaching at UCLA Anderson School of Management as an assistant professor of economics, and was quickly awarded tenure. He spent brief periods of time as an economic fellow at the Brookings Institution and at the Securities and Exchange Commission, but has otherwise spent his professional career at Anderson. He was appointed interim dean of Anderson in 2018. According to UCLA Anderson, Osborne is the founder and faculty director of the Harold and Pauline Price Center for Entrepreneurial Studies and continues to hold leadership roles at the school.

=== Selected works ===
- Bradford, William D., and Alfred E. Osborne. "The entrepreneurship decision and black economic development." The American Economic Review 66, no. 2 (1976): 316–319.
- Osborne Jr, Alfred E. "Rule 144 Volume Limitations and the Sale of Restricted Stock in the Over-The-Counter Market." The Journal of Finance 37, no. 2 (1982): 505–517.
- Osborne, Alfred E. "On the Economic Cost to Panama of Negotiating a Peaceful Solution to the Panama Canal Question." Journal of Interamerican Studies and World Affairs 19, no. 4 (1977): 509–521.
- Bates, Timothy, and Alfred E. Osborne JR. "The perverse effects of SBA loans to minority wholesalers." Urban Affairs Quarterly 15, no. 1 (1979): 87–97.
- Osborne Jr, Alfred E. "The welfare effect of black capitalists on the black community." The Review of Black Political Economy 6, no. 4 (1976): 477–484.
