= William Rodgers (economist) =

American economist

William M. Rodgers, III
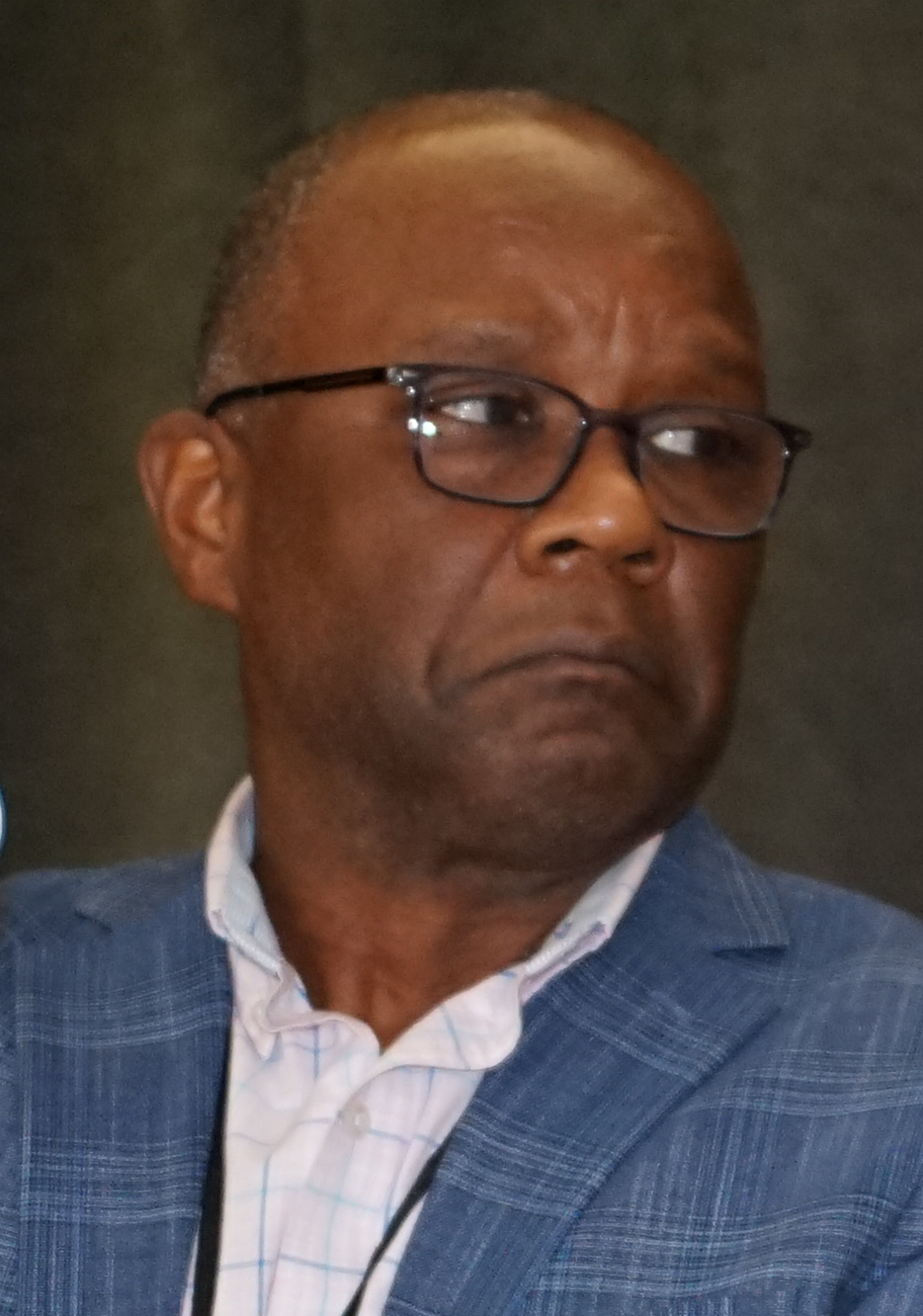
- Rodgers at ASSA 2026
- Born: December 8, 1963 (age 62)

Academic background
- Education: Harvard University (MA), (PhD); University of California, Santa Barbara (MA); Dartmouth College (BA), 1986
- Website: https://bloustein.rutgers.edu/rodgers/; Information at IDEAS / RePEc

William M. Rodgers, III (born December 8, 1963) is an American economist who is a professor of Public Policy at Rutgers University and the former Chief Economist for the U.S. Department of Labor in 2000–2001.

== Education and early life ==
Rodgers graduated from Dartmouth College and earned a PhD from Harvard University.

== Career ==
Rodgers joined the faculty of the College of William and Mary in 1993. He was Chief Economist of the U.S. Department of Labor from 2000 to 2001, and joined the faculty of Rutgers University's School of Management and Labor Relations in 2006. He is a member of the National Academy of Social Insurance and has been president of the National Economic Association.

=== Selected publications ===
- Rodgers, William M. Handbook on the Economics of Discrimination. Edward Elgar Publishing, 2009.
- Valerie, Wilson, and William M. Rogers III. "Black-white wage gaps expand with rising wage inequality." Washington, DC: Economic Policy Institute. (2016).
- Badgett, MV Lee, W. M. Rogers, Darrell L. Williams, Tom Larson, Ward Thomas, Mark Garrett, and Paula Sirola. "The impact of affirmative action on public sector employment and contracting in California." University of California Office of the President, Oakland (1997).
- Rabby, Faisal, and William M. Rodgers III. "The Impact of 9/11 and the London Bombings on the Employment and Earnings of UK Muslims." (2010).
