= Robert Vowels =

American economist

- Born: Baltimore, Maryland

Academic background
- Education: Howard University (BA) (MA) American University (PhD)

Academic work
- Discipline: Urban Economics, Labor Economics
- Institutions: Atlanta University; United States Department of the Treasury

Robert C. Vowels was an American economist who was Dean of Atlanta University's School of Business and an early president of the National Economic Association.

== Education and early life ==
Vowels was a native of Baltimore, Maryland, and earned B.A. and M.A. degrees from Howard University. He completed his PhD at American University.

== Career ==
After graduating from Howard, Vowels worked in the District of Columbia Public Library system and as an instructor of economics at Howard. In 1961, he was named one of the first four Black economists appointed to analyst positions in the United States Department of the Treasury. Later, he became Dean of Atlanta University's School of Business.

=== Selected works ===
- Vowels, Robert C. "Atlanta Negro Business and the New Black Bourgeoisie." Atlanta Historical Bulletin 21 (1977): 48–63.
- Vowels, Robert C. "The Political Economy of American Racism–Nonblack Decision-Making and Black Economic Status." The Review of Black Political Economy 1, no. 4 (1971): 3-39.
- Hefner, James A., and Robert C. Vowels. "MANAGERIAL MANPOWER TRAINING FOR DEVELOPMENT OF BLACK MANAGERIAL SKILLS." Personnel Journal 52, no. 4 (1973): 274.
- Vowels, Robert C. Association Economists, Academic Hiring and Publications on Minority Economic Problems. No. 477. 1977.
