= William D. Bradford =

American economist (born 1944)

William Donald Bradford
- Born: June 19, 1944 (age 82); Gadsden, Alabama

Academic background
- Education: Howard University (BA), 1967; Ohio State University (MBA), 1968; (PhD) 1971

Academic work
- Discipline: Finance
- Institutions: Foster School of Business; Robert H. Smith School of Business; Stanford Business School
- Website: http://faculty.washington.edu/bradford/

William Donald Bradford (born June 19, 1944) is an American economist who is Professor Emeritus of Finance and former Dean of the Foster School of Business at the University of Washington. He is a former president of the National Economic Association and was inducted into the Minority Business Hall of Fame in 2013.

== Education and early life ==
Bradford was the fourth of six children born to Ollie Mae Dobbs and George Joel Bradford, a Baptist minister and barbershop owner. He moved from Gadsden, Alabama to Cleveland, Ohio as a young child, where he attended East Technical High School and earned money for college by working as a barber in his father's shop. He attended Howard University, where he was a linebacker on the football team, graduating with a B.A. in economics in 1967. He earned an MBA in 1968 and a PhD in finance in 1971 from the Ohio State University.

== Career ==
Bradford was an associate professor of finance at Stanford Graduate School of Business from 1972 to 1980, and chaired the Finance Department and then served as Associate Dean in the Robert H. Smith School of Business at the University of Maryland, College Park from 1984 - 1994. In 1994, he become Dean of the University of Washington School of Business. Bradford was given the honorary status Dean Emeritus from the University of Washington in 1999.

=== Selected works ===
- Bradford, William D. "The “myth” that black entrepreneurship can reduce the gap in wealth between black and white families." Economic Development Quarterly 28, no. 3 (2014): 254-269.
- Bates, Timothy, William D. Bradford, and Robert Seamans. "Minority entrepreneurship in twenty-first century America." Small Business Economics 50, no. 3 (2018): 415–427.
- Jackson III, William E., Timothy Bates, and William D. Bradford. "Does venture capitalist activism improve investment performance?." Journal of Business Venturing 27, no. 3 (2012): 342–354.
- Bradford, William D., and Alfred E. Osborne. "The entrepreneurship decision and black economic development." The American Economic Review 66, no. 2 (1976): 316–319.
- Bates, Timothy, and William D. Bradford. "Factors affecting new firm success and their use in venture capital financing." The Journal of Entrepreneurial Finance 2, no. 1 (1992): 23–38.
