= Susan Williams McElroy =

American economist

- Education: Princeton University, B.A; Stanford University, PhD
- Scientific career
- Fields: Economics
- Workplaces: Heinz College, Carnegie Mellon University; University of Texas at Dallas
- Website: https://personal.utdallas.edu/~skm028000/

Susan Williams McElroy is an American economist who is an associate professor of economics and education policy at the University of Texas-Dallas. She is a former president of the National Economic Association.

== Selected research publications ==
- Hotz, V. Joseph, Susan Williams McElroy, and Seth G. Sanders. "Teenage childbearing and its life cycle consequences exploiting a natural experiment." Journal of Human Resources 40, no. 3 (2005): 683–715.
- Hotz, V. Joseph, Susan Williams McElroy, and Seth G. Sanders. "The impacts of teenage childbearing on the mothers and the consequences of those impacts for government." Kids having kids: Economic costs and social consequences of teen pregnancy (1997): 55–94.
- McElroy, Susan Williams. "Early childbearing, high school completion, and college enrollment: Evidence from 1980 high school sophomores." Economics of Education Review 15, no. 3 (1996): 303–324.
- McElroy, Susan Williams, and Leon T. Andrews Jr. "The black male and the US economy." The Annals of the American Academy of Political and Social Science 569, no. 1 (2000): 160–175.
- Fernandes, Ronald, Inhyuck Steve Ha, Susan Williams McElroy, and Samuel L. Myers. "Black-White disparities in test scores: Distributional characteristics." The Review of Black Political Economy 43, no. 2 (2016): 209–232.

== Community roles ==
McElroy is on the executive committee of the Dallas Black Chamber of Commerce, and serves as volunteer economist-in-residence for the Interdenominational Ministerial Alliance of Greater Dallas and Vicinity, which presented her with its 2017 President's Award for her efforts.
