= Huey Battle =

US economist and academic administrator

Huey Jefferson Battle
- Born: October 31, 1918; Rusk, Texas, U.S.
- Died: January 23, 1991 (aged 72); Petersburg, Virginia, U.S.

Academic background
- Education: Langston University, (BA) 1947; University of Wisconsin, MA; Oklahoma State University, (1954) PhD

Academic work
- Discipline: Agricultural Economics
- Institutions: Virginia State University; Langston University

Huey Jefferson Battle (October 31, 1918 – January 23, 1991) was an American economist who was an economics professor and administrator at Langston University and Virginia State University. He was the first African-American in Oklahoma to earn a doctoral degree, and was posthumously inducted into the Oklahoma State University Diversity Hall of Fame in 2017.

== Education and early life ==
Battle was born in Rusk, Texas in October 1918, and raised in Wewoka, Oklahoma. He served in the U.S. Army Air Corps during World War II, and then graduated from Langston University. In 1954, he was the first African American to receive a PhD degree from Oklahoma State University, writing a dissertation in Agricultural Economics entitled, "Economic effects of some major changes in the flour-milling industry." He was a life member of the Alpha Phi Alpha fraternity.

== Career ==
Battle began his professional career as high school teacher, later becoming a professor at Langston University, where he served as department chair. In 1962, he became chair of the Department of Agriculture at Virginia State University in Petersburg, Virginia. He retired from that institution in 1985 as vice president of research and development. He was also a president of the National Economic Association.
