= Karl D. Gregory =

Professor emeritus of economics

- Born: Detroit, MI

Academic background
- Education: Wayne State University (BA) (MA) University of Michigan (PhD)

Academic work
- Discipline: Urban Economics, Labor Economics
- Institutions: Oakland University; Wayne State University; Congressional Budget Office; Office of Management and Budget
- Awards: MLK Community Service award, 2008; Bishop H. Coleman McGehee, Jr., Lifetime Achievement Award, 2014

Karl D. Gregory is an American economist who is professor emeritus of economics at Oakland University in Michigan, and was an early president of the National Economic Association. In 1962, he was refused the opportunity to purchase a home in developer William Levitt's Belair subdivision of Bowie, Maryland, based on his race, sparking extensive protests which contributed to the passage of the Civil Rights Act of 1968.

== Education and early life ==
Gregory was born and raised in Detroit, Michigan. He earned two degrees from Wayne State University and a PhD in economics from the University of Michigan.

== Career ==
Gregory worked in the Bureau of the Budget (now the Office of Management and Budget) in Washington, D.C., in the Kennedy and Johnson administrations while volunteering as chair of the Congress of Racial Equality. He then joined the faculty of Oakland University, where he taught for 27 years.

In 2014, the Michigan Coalition for Human Rights awarded him the Bishop H. Coleman McGehee Jr., Lifetime Achievement Award.

=== Selected works ===
- Gregory, Karl D. "Some Alternatives for Reducing the Black-White Unemployment Rate Differential." The American Economic Review 66, no. 2 (1976): 324–327.
- Gregory, Karl D. "Brief report of the State of the Black Economy, 1973." The Review of Black Political Economy 3, no. 3 (1973): 3–16.
- Gregory, Karl D. "A task force report on Ghana." The Review of Black Political Economy 10, no. 2 (1980): 169–184.
