= Shelley White-Means =

Economist

- Born: Memphis, TN
- Education: Grinnell College, B.A; Northwestern University, MA, PhD
- Children: 1
- Scientific career
- Fields: Economics
- Workplaces: Cornell University; University of Memphis; University of Tennessee Health Science Center
- Doctoral advisor: Mark Pauly
- Website: https://independent.academia.edu/ShelleyWhitemeans

Shelley White-Means is an American health economist who is a professor at The University of Tennessee Health Science Center (UTHSC), and director of the Consortium for Health Education, Economic Empowerment and Research (CHEER) at UTHSC. She is a past president of the National Economic Association.

== Early life and education ==
White-Means was born and raised in Memphis, TN. She planned to become an accountant until she was awarded a full scholarship to Grinnell College and studied economics, and realized it could be a pathway to improving health care in her home city. She earned a PhD from Northwestern University, where she was the first Black female graduate of that Economics PhD program.

== Career ==
White-Means began her career as a faculty member in the Consumer Economics Department of Cornell University, before returning to Memphis to join the faculty of the University of Memphis. She is founder and director of the Consortium on Health Education, Economic Empowerment and Research (CHEER), which focuses on education and active community engagement to reduce health disparities in Memphis and Shelby County. She is the author or co-author of dozens of publications, and was awarded the 2009 Rufus A. Lyman Award for the best paper published in the American Journal of Pharmaceutical Education that year.

== Selected research publications ==
- Franklin, Brandi, Ashley Jones, Dejuan Love, Stephane Puckett, Justin Macklin, and Shelley White-Means. "Exploring mediators of food insecurity and obesity: a review of recent literature." Journal of community health 37, no. 1 (2012): 253–264.
- Chang, Cyril F., and Shelley I. White-Means. "The men who care: An analysis of male primary caregivers who care for frail elderly at home." Journal of Applied Gerontology 10, no. 3 (1991): 343–358.
- Rubin, Rose M., and Shelley I. White-Means. "Informal caregiving: Dilemmas of sandwiched caregivers." Journal of Family and Economic Issues 30, no. 3 (2009): 252–267.
- White-Means, Shelley, Zhiyong Dong, Meghan Hufstader, and Lawrence T. Brown. "Cultural competency, race, and skin tone bias among pharmacy, nursing, and medical students: implications for addressing health disparities." Medical Care Research and Review 66, no. 4 (2009): 436–455.
- White-Means, Shelley I., and Cyril F. Chang. "Informal caregivers' leisure time and stress." Journal of Family and Economic Issues 15, no. 2 (1994): 117–136.
