= Willene Johnson =

American economist

Willene A. Johnson
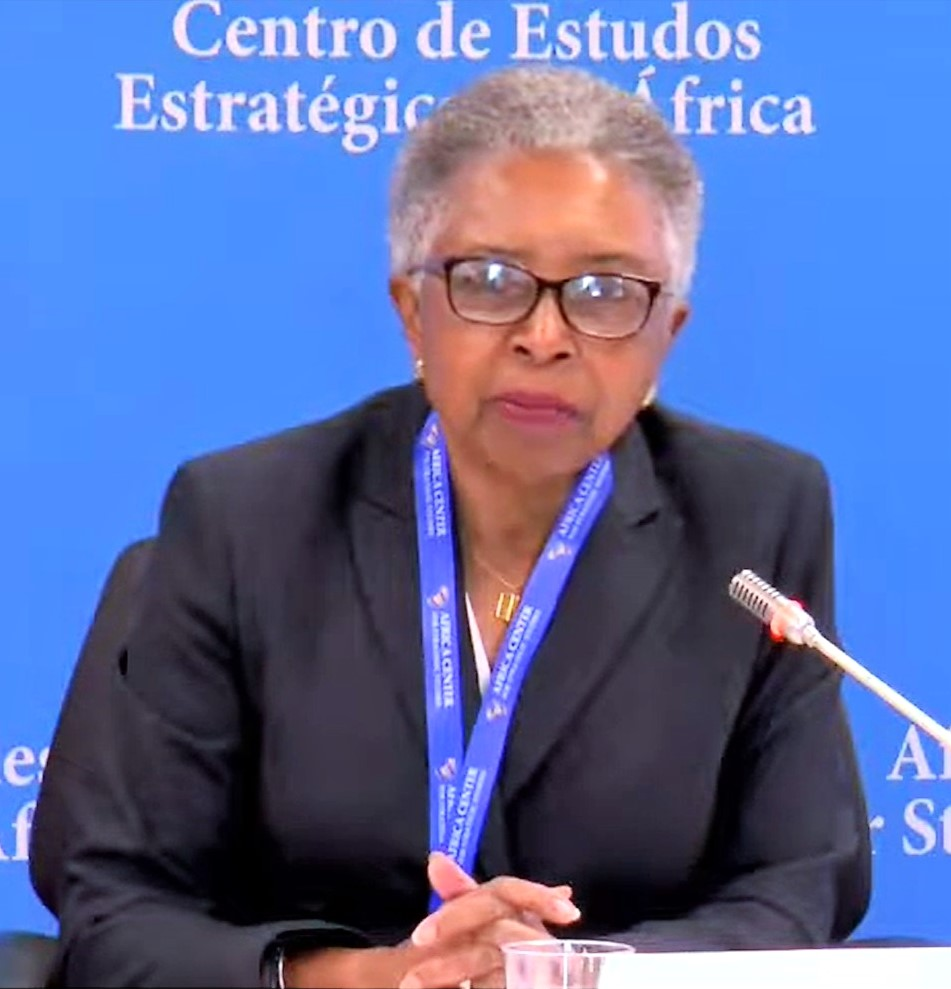
- Johnson at the Africa Center for Strategic Studies in 2017
- Born: circa 1947

Academic background
- Education: Columbia University (PhD); Radcliffe College (BA), 1968

Academic work
- Institutions: African Development Bank; Federal Reserve Bank of New York
- Awards: 2011 Clifton R. Wharton Jr. Award for “Outstanding Service, Leadership and Contribution to Economic Progress in Emerging Markets.”

Willene A. Johnson (born about 1947) is an American economist who is a former vice president of the Federal Reserve Bank of New York, former U.S. Executive Director of the African Development Bank, and a former president of the National Economic Association.

In 2011, Cornell University awarded her the Clifton R. Wharton Jr. Award for "Outstanding Service, Leadership and Contribution to Economic Progress in Emerging Markets."

== Education and early life ==
Johnson graduated from Radcliffe College with a degree in social studies in 1968, from St. John's University (New York City) with a degree in African History, and from Columbia University, with a PhD in Development economics. While a student at Radcliffe, she was a member of the Harvard-Radcliffe Association for African and Afro-American Students (AFRO). She became interested in African Development as director and a volunteer teacher with Volunteer Teachers for Africa, a student-run program at Harvard and Radcliffe.

== Career ==
Johnson worked in the Federal Reserve system, from 1982 to 1999, when she was nominated as U.S. Executive Director of the African Development Bank. She has also served as a member of the United Nations Committee for Development Policy and chair of the Sub-Saharan Africa Advisory Committee of the United States Export-Import Bank.

Johnson has also worked as a consultant and adjunct faculty member at several colleges and universities, supported the work of the Women's Institute for Science, Equity and Race (WISER), and is a member of the International Advisory Board of the Association For The Advancement of African Women Economists (AAAWE). In 2018, Johnson told The Harvard Crimson, "In today's environment, when many people at the age of 70 would be ready to retire, I think many of us who were engaged in the movement for social justice in the sixties find ourselves recognizing that the African phrase, ‘the struggle continues’—aluta continua—is still very relevant. We're still struggling and we're not going to give up."

In 2020, Fanta Traore, writing for Fortune, named her one of "19 Black economists to celebrate and know," and noted Johnson is the president of Komaza Inc., "a consulting firm that offers instruction and advice on economic and financial development, including microfinance, security sector resource management, and the role of economics in conflict management."

Her public speaking appearances include the keynote speech at the first conference of the Sadie Collective in 2019, intended to increase the number of Black Women in Economics and related fields. At the conference, Johnson said, "We need to follow Alexander’s example of developing carefully collected data from communities where policy will be implemented, as well as develop sound economic theory to dislodge accepted models of analysis and policies that contribute to the systems of poverty, and powerlessness in many communities of color," referring to Sadie T.M. Alexander, the first woman in the United States to earn a Ph.D. in economics and the first African-American woman to practice law in Pennsylvania. Johnson also was a co-presenter of the "Security Spending Analysis and Accountability" session at the African Parliamentarians’ Forum 2021: Oversight of the Security Sector hosted by the Africa Center for Strategic Studies.

=== Selected publications ===
- Johnson, Willene. "Policy responses to economic vulnerability" Economic & Social Affairs, CDP Background Paper No. 9 (2006).
- Johnson, Willene A. "Women and self-employment in urban Tanzania." The Review of Black Political Economy 14, no. 2-3 (1985): 245–257. doi.org/10.1007/BF02689892
- Bogan, Vicki, Willene Johnson, and Nomathemba Mhlanga. Microfinance institution capital structure and financial sustainability. No. 7. Working Papers, 2007.
- Johnson, Willene A. "Food and Politics: A Case Study of Ethiopia." Horn of Africa 2, no. 1 (1979): 28–35.
- Christy, Ralph D., Mark Wenner, Emelly Mutambatsere, and Willene Johnson. "How Can Financial Markets and Biotechnology Help the Rural Poor?." In Financial Inclusion, Innovation, and Investments: Biotechnology and Capital Markets Working for the Poor, pp. 1–26. 2011.
- Besada, Hany, ed. (October 2009). From Civil Strife to Peace Building: Examining Private Sector Involvement in West African Reconstruction. Wilfrid Laurier University Press. ISBN 9781554580521. "Johnson, Willene. Côte d'Ivoire: The Role of the Private Sector in Building a Peace Economy"

== Honors and awards ==
- In 2021, Johnson was elected as a fellow of the National Academy of Public Administration.
- 2011 Wharton Award, Cornell University
