= James Peoples =

American economist (born 1959)

James H. Peoples Jr.
- Born: May 14, 1959 (age 67)
- Citizenship: United States

Academic background
- Education: University of California, Berkeley (PhD), 1984; California State University, Dominguez Hills (BA), 1979

Academic work
- Discipline: Transportation Economics
- Institutions: University of Wisconsin–Milwaukee; Rutgers University
- Website: https://sites.uwm.edu/peoples/; Information at IDEAS / RePEc

James H. Peoples Jr. (born May 14, 1959) is an American economist who is a professor of economics at the University of Wisconsin–Milwaukee, and a former president of the National Economic Association and the Transportation and Public Utilities Group. He is an expert in the economics of transportation and transportation labor issues.

== Education and early life ==
Peoples grew up in Los Angeles. He graduated from California State University, Dominguez Hills in 1979 and received his PhD from University of California, Berkeley in 1984.

== Career ==
Peoples taught at Rutgers University from 1984 to 1990, and has been on the faculty of the University of Wisconsin–Milwaukee since then. He has been president of the American Economic Association’s Transportation and Public Utilities Group and the National Economic Association.

=== Selected publications ===
- Peoples, James, with Azrina Abdullah Al-Hadi, and John Bitzan.“Input Allocation Efficiency in the United States Railroad Industry: Changing Work-Rules and Managerial Flexibility.” Transportation Research Part A: Policy and Practice, Volume 126, August 2019, pp: 281–296.
- Peoples, James, with Richard McGregory and Nicholas Hill “NonCitizen Employment and the Wages of Healthcare Support Worker in the US.” Journal of Labor Research, Volume 39 (4), December, 2018, pp: 433–461.
- Peoples, James, with John Bitzan. "Contemporary Issues in Transportation Policy and Economic Regulation: Essays in Honor of Theodore Keeler." edited volume, Elsevier Science, Amsterdam, 2018.
- Peoples, James with Xiaowen Fu. "Airline Economics in Asia." edited volume as part of the Advances in Airline Economics Series, Volume 7, Emerald Press, UK. 2018.
- Peoples, James with Azrina Abdullah Al-Hadi. “An Empirical Analysis of Economies of Scope in the US Railroad Industry,” In US Freight Rail Economics and Policy: Are We on the Right Track? editors, Jeffrey Macher and John Mayo, Routledge Press, New York, New York. 2019, pp: 179–210.
