= National Economic Association =

- Formation: 1969
- Legal status: Learned society of economics
- Purpose: "to promote the professional lives of minorities within the profession. In addition to continuing its founding mission, the organization is particularly interested in producing and distributing knowledge of economic issues that are of exceptional interest to promoting economic growth among native and immigrant African Americans, Latinos, and other people of color."
- Region served: United States
- President: Nzinga Broussard
- Website: www.neaecon.org

The National Economic Association (NEA) is a learned society established in 1969, focused on initiatives in the field of economics.

The purposes of the Association are "to promote the professional lives of minorities within the profession. In addition to continuing its founding mission, the organization is particularly interested in producing and distributing knowledge of economic issues that are of exceptional interest to promoting economic growth among native and immigrant African Americans, Latinos, and other people of color." Membership in the Association is available to professionals and graduate students in Economics and related disciplines. The NEA publishes the Review of Black Political Economy and regularly collaborates with the Allied Social Science Associations, American Economic Association, and American Society of Hispanic Economics.

== History ==
The NEA was established in 1969 as the "Caucus of Black Economists" in New York City at the annual economists' convention that year. Its founders, Charles Wilson and Marcus Alexis, with Thaddeus Spratlen, began "an organized effort to challenge the American Economic Association (AEA) to engage in strategies that increase opportunities for black economists’ development." They were successful in persuading the AEA to establish a Committee on the Status of Minority Groups in the Economics Profession (CSMGEP) and to sponsor a summer program that helps undergraduates of color prepare for graduate school admission.

Founder Bernard Anderson of the Wharton School of Business said that when the group first met, the leaders of the American Economic Association called the police. "They thought we were a bunch of radicals who wanted to disrupt the convention,” Mr. Anderson said, “when all we wanted to be was economists.”

In 1975, the group was reorganized as the "National Economic Association" to focus on initiatives independent of the CSMGEP, particularly awarding recognition to Black economics for their accomplishments in the economics profession.

== Activities ==
The annual meetings of the NEA are held in conjunction with the annual Allied Social Science Associations (ASSA) meetings each January, and include multiple panels of research presentations. In addition, the NEA collaborates with the American Society of Hispanic Economics to host a summer conference on the subject of economic problems and potential solutions for Black and Hispanic communities, as well as racial and ethnic economic disparities and policies designed to counter these disparities.

Since 1977, the NEA has published The Review of Black Political Economy, a journal focusing on "research that examines issues related to the economic status of African-Americans, the African diaspora, and marginalized populations throughout the world."

The Association periodically awards the Westerfield Award in acknowledgement of outstanding scholarly achievements and public service by an African-American economist. This award, established in 1973, was named after economist and ambassador Samuel Z. Westerfield Jr. The association also awards the Rhonda Williams Dissertation Award to junior scholars, named after multidisciplinary scholar Rhonda M. Williams.

Since 2008, the NEA has collaborated with the American Economic Association's Committee on the Status of Minority Groups in the Economics Profession (AEA-CSMGEP) and the American Society of Hispanic Economists (ASHE) to publish an annual newsletter, "Minority Report," which "showcases the people, programs, research, and activities of the three groups, which together help to increase the representation of minorities in the economics profession." There is a great deal of overlap in the leadership of the NEA and the AEA-CSMGEP, but they are separate organizations.

== Westerfield Award recipients ==
The Samuel Z. Westerfield Award is occasionally presented to black economists "in recognition of their distinguished service, outstanding scholarship, and achievement of high standards of excellence."

Past recipients of the Award:

- 2021 James B. Stewart
- 2018 Cecilia A Conrad
- 2015 Samuel Myers, Jr
- 2012 William A. Darity, Jr.
- 2008 Margaret Simms
- 2006 David Swinton
- 2003 Bernard E. Anderson
- 1995 Samuel L. Myers, Sr.
- 1990 Andrew F. Brimmer
- 1986 Clifton R. Wharton, Jr
- 1982 Phyllis A. Wallace
- 1979 Marcus A. Alexis
- 1975 Sir W. Arthur Lewis
- 1973 Samuel Z. Westerfield Jr (posthumous)

== Association presidents ==
Presidents of the association:

- 2024 Nzinga Broussard
- 2023 Angelino Viceisza
- 2022 Valerie Rawlston Wilson
- 2021 Nina Banks
- 2020 Linwood Tauheed
- 2019 Omari Swinton
- 2018 Olugbenga Ajilore
- 2017 Rhonda Vonshay Sharpe
- 2016 Darrick Hamilton
- 2015 Lisa Cook
- 2014 Trevon Logan
- 2013 Warren Whatley
- 2012 Jessica Gordon Nembhard
- 2011 Juliet Elu
- 2010 Susan Williams McElroy
- 2009 Peter Blair Henry
- 2008 James Peoples
- 2007 Gregory Price
- 2006 Kwabena Gyimah-Brempong
- 2005 Philip Jefferson
- 2004 Sheila Ards
- 2003 William Rodgers
- 2002 Patrick Mason
- 2001 Kaye Husbands Fealing
- 2000 William Spriggs
- 1999 Willene Johnson
- 1998 Gwendolyn Flowers
- 1997 Agustin K. Fosu
- 1996 Shelley White-Means
- 1995 Alvin E. Headen
- 1994 James B. Stewart
- 1993 Cecilia A. Conrad
- 1992 Arthur T. King
- 1991 Charles L. Betsey
- 1990 Thomas D. Boston
- 1989 Stephanie Y. Wilson
- 1988 Samuel Myers, Jr
- 1987 Barbara A. P. Jones
- 1986 William A. Darity, Jr.
- 1985 Richard F. America, Jr
- 1984 William D. Bradford
- 1983 David Swinton
- 1982 Bernard E. Anderson
- 1981 Alfred E. Osborne
- 1980 Vincent R. McDonald
- 1979 Margaret Simms
- 1978 Flournoy A. Coles
- 1977 Huey J. Battle
- 1976 Alfred L. Edwards
- 1975 Edward D. Irons
- 1974 Robert C. Vowels
- 1973 Karl D. Gregory
- 1972 Charles Z. Wilson
- 1970-1971 Marcus Alexis

== See also ==
- American Economic Association
