= Samuel Myers Jr. =

American economist and author

Samuel L. Myers Jr.
- Born: March 9, 1949 (age 77)
- Education: Morgan State University (BA); Massachusetts Institute of Technology (PhD)
- Spouse: Sheila D. Ards
- Awards: Samuel Z. Westerfield Award
- Scientific career
- Fields: Labor Economics
- Workplaces: University of Minnesota; University of Maryland, College Park; University of Pittsburgh; Federal Trade Commission; University of Texas, Austin
- Doctoral advisor: Michael Piore; Lester C. Thurow; Robert M. Solow (chair)
- Website: https://www.hhh.umn.edu/directory/samuel-l-myers-jr

Samuel L. Myers Jr. (born 9 March 1949) is an American economist and Roy Wilkins Professor of Human Relations and Social Justice in the Hubert H. Humphrey School of Public Affairs at the University of Minnesota. He has been awarded the Samuel Z. Westerfield Jr., Award by the National Economic Association and the Marilyn J. Gittell Activist Scholar Award from the Urban Affairs Association (UAA) and SAGE Publishing. In 2007, Myers was elected as a fellow of the National Academy of Public Administration. In 2024, Myers was elected as the inaugural Rebecca Blanks Fellow of the American Academy of Political and Social Science.

== Early life and education ==
Myers was raised near the campus of Morgan State University, where his father, Samuel L. Myers Sr. was an economics professor. He was born deaf, as was his mother and his maternal grandfather. Through his father, Myers Jr. is of Jamaican descent. He graduated from Morgan State and then did his doctoral work at the Massachusetts Institute of Technology.

== Career ==
Myers has taught at the University of Texas, Austin, University of Maryland, College Park, University of Pittsburgh and the University of Minnesota, and has been an economist with the Federal Trade Commission. He has served as president of both the National Economic Association and the Association of Public Policy and Management. He has authored or edited several books and dozens of papers using applied econometric techniques to study racial inequality in law enforcement, procurement and contracting, housing, faculty employment, food availability, family structure, and government aid.

Since 1992, Myers has been Director and Professor of the Roy Wilkins Center for Human Relations and Social Justice at the Humphrey School of Public Affairs.

=== Selected works ===
- C Chung, SL Myers Jr. "Do the poor pay more for food? An analysis of grocery store availability and food price disparities" Journal of consumer affairs 33 (2), 276–296
- SL Myers Jr. "Estimating the economic model of crime: Employment versus punishment effects" The Quarterly Journal of Economics 98 (1), 157–166
- Darity Jr, William A., and Samuel L. Myers Jr. "persistent disparity." Books (1998).
- W Darity, SL Myers Jr "Changes in black family structure: Implications for welfare dependency" The American Economic Review 73 (2), 59–64
- SL Myers Jr, T Chan "Who benefits from minority business set‐asides? The case of New Jersey" Journal of Policy Analysis and Management 15 (2), 202–226
