= Samuel Z. Westerfield Jr. =

American diplomat (1919–1972)

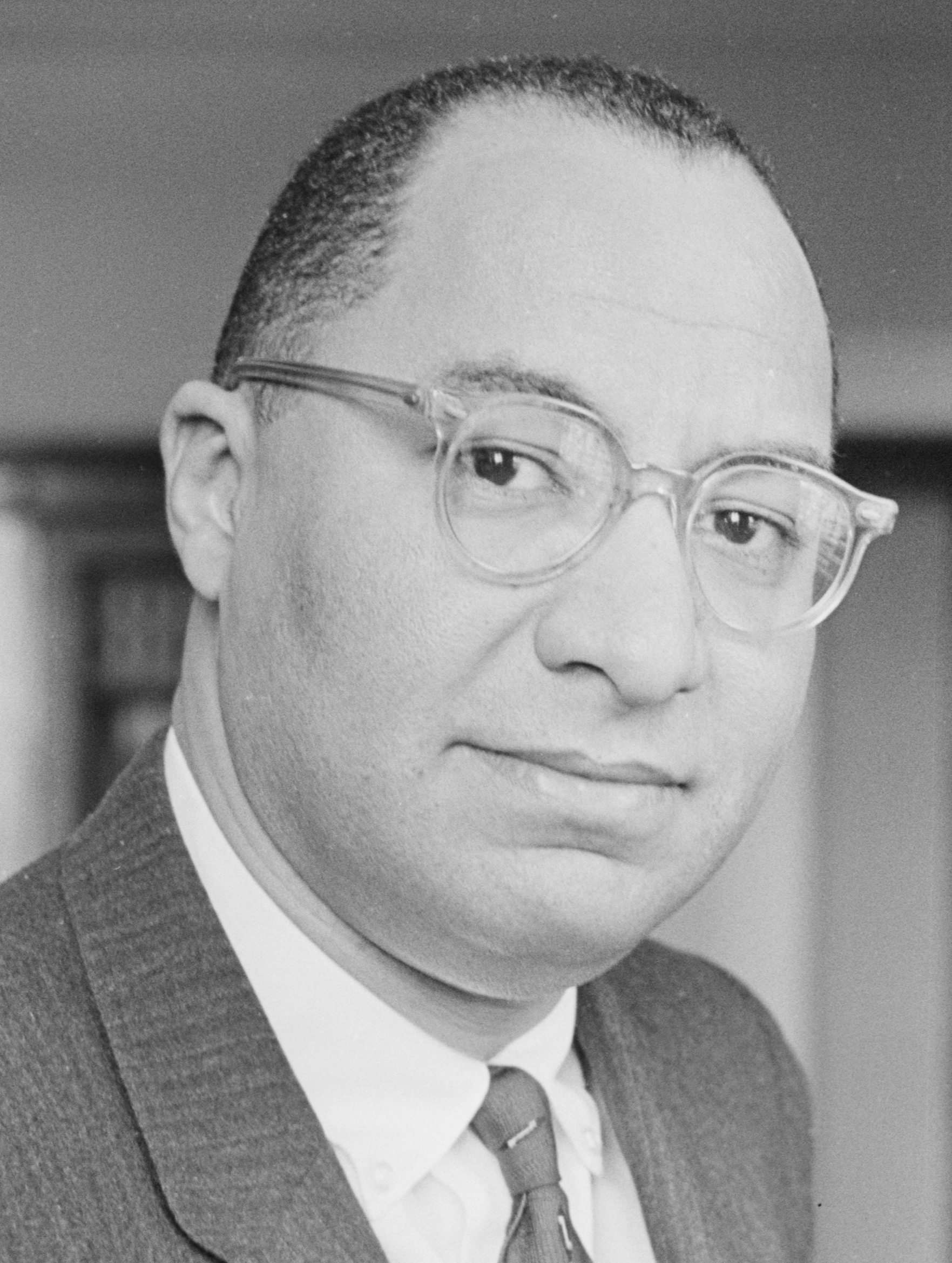
- Westerfield in 1961

31st United States Ambassador to Liberia
- In office December 9, 1969 – July 19, 1972
- President: Richard Nixon
- Preceded by: Ben H. Brown Jr.
- Succeeded by: Melvin L. Manfull

Personal details
- Born: November 15, 1919 Chicago, Illinois, U.S.
- Died: July 19, 1972 (aged 52) Monrovia, Liberia
- Spouse: Helene Bryant
- Children: 2

Samuel Zazu Westerfield Jr. (November 15, 1919, Chicago, Illinois – July 19, 1972, Monrovia, Liberia) was a career foreign services officer who was appointed American ambassador to Liberia on July 8, 1969.

== Early life ==
Westerfield's parents were Dr. Samuel Z.C. Westerfield and Rachael Weddleton Colquitt. His father was the first black student to graduate with a Ph.D. in engineering from the University of Nebraska.

Westerfield graduated magna cum laude from Howard University in 1939 and continued his education to earn a master's degree from Harvard University in 1949 and his doctorate from Harvard in 1950.

== Career ==
His career in economics included teaching at the University of Nebraska-Lincoln and serving as dean of the school of business administration at Clark Atlanta University as well as being a visiting professor in the Harvard Business School. Transitioning to government service, he was associate director of the treasury during the Kennedy administration before he became deputy director of the Treasury Department. He went on to become the deputy director of the Debt Analysis Staff and deputy director of the office of International Affairs.

He was one of the first black economists to join the diplomatic service and was considered an authority on the economic plight of Africa. In 1969, he would become the US ambassador to Liberia under the Nixon administration.

== Personal life ==
In 1945, he married Helene Bryant, an educator and graduate of Spelman College. They had two children, Shelia and Samuel Z. Westerfield III.

== Death ==
Westerfield had a fatal heart attack on July 19, 1972, at the embassy in Monrovia at the age of 52. He had recently returned from a dinner party when he became ill. Shortly before his death, Westerfield and his wife, Helene, served as official hosts to Mrs. Richard Nixon who attended the inauguration ceremonies of Liberian President William Tolbert. The officially reported cause of death was coronary thrombosis.

== Legacy ==
The National Economic Association (NEA) awards the "Samuel Z. Westerfield Jr. Award" every 3–5 years to African-American economists in recognition of outstanding scholarship, distinguished service, and overall excellence. This is the most prestigious award of the NEA. The award was presented first, posthumously, to Ambassador Westerfield.
