= Juliet Elu =

American economist

Juliet U. Elu
- Education: Utah State University; University of Utah
- Occupation: Economist

Juliet U. Elu is an American economist who is currently Charles E. Merrill Professor of Economics and Chair of the Division of Business and Economics at Morehouse College. She was previously Vice Chancellor of Gregory University in Nigeria and she is a former president of both the National Economic Association and the African Finance and Economics Association.

== Early life and education ==
Elu completed a BS in Economics and Political Science, an MBA, and an MPA at Utah State University. She completed a PhD in Economics at the University of Utah in 1992.

== Career ==
Elu has taught at Clarke University, Spelman College, and Morehouse College. She was brought to Nigeria to lead the new private Catholic Gregory University in Uturu in south east Nigeria.

=== Selected works ===
- Banya, Kingsley, and Juliet Elu. "The World Bank and financing higher education in sub-Saharan Africa." Higher Education 42, no. 1 (2001): 1-34.
- Elu, Juliet U., and Gregory N. Price. "Does China transfer productivity enhancing technology to Sub‐Saharan Africa? Evidence from manufacturing firms." African Development Review 22 (2010): 587-598.
- Elu, Juliet U., and Linda Loubert. "Earnings inequality and the intersectionality of gender and ethnicity in Sub-Saharan Africa: The case of Tanzanian manufacturing." American Economic Review 103, no. 3 (2013): 289-92.
- Elu, Juliet. "Human development in sub-Saharan Africa: Analysis and prospects for the future." Journal of third world studies 17, no. 2 (2000): 53-71.
- Price, Gregory N., and Juliet U. Elu. "Does regional currency integration ameliorate global macroeconomic shocks in sub-Saharan Africa? The case of the 2008-2009 global financial crisis." Journal of Economic Studies (2014).
