= Alfred L. Edwards =

American economist

- Born: August 9, 1920
- Died: January 26, 2007 (aged 86); Ann Arbor, Michigan

Academic background
- Education: Livingstone College (BA), 1948; University of Michigan (MA), 1949; University of Iowa (PhD), 1958

Academic work
- Discipline: Business Economics
- Institutions: Ross School of Business, University of Michigan; United States Department of Agriculture

Alfred Leroy Edwards (August 9, 1920 – January 26, 2007) was an American economist who was an emeritus professor of business administration at Ross School of Business at the University of Michigan, and the first African-American Deputy Assistant Secretary of Agriculture in the United States.

== Early life and education ==
Edwards was born in Key West, Florida, the only son of Eddie and Kathleen Edwards. He was a veteran of the Second World War, and graduated from Livingstone College with a BA in 1948, The University of Michigan in 1949, and the University of Iowa in 1958 with a PhD.

== Career ==
Edwards taught at Southern University, the University of Iowa, Michigan State University, and Howard University before being appointed as Deputy Assistant Secretary of Agriculture in 1963. He served in this role from 1963 to 1973, receiving the Distinguished Service Award of the Department of Agriculture in 1969. He joined the Ross School of Business at the University of Michigan in 1974, and remained at that institution for the remainder of his career. He served as president of the National Economic Association, and was a longtime trustee of Western Michigan University.

=== Selected works ===
- Cole, John A., Alfred L. Edwards, Earl G. Hamilton, and Lucy J. Reuben. "Black banks: a survey and analysis of the literature." The Review of Black Political Economy 14, no. 1 (1985): 29–50.
- Edwards, Alfred L. "Land Reform in Iraq: Economic and Social Implications." Land Economics 37, no. 1 (1961): 68–81.

== Legacy ==
There are several memorials to Edwards at Ross School of Business. The Annual Black Business Students Association Conference at the Ross School of Business is named in his honor, there is an Alfred L. Edwards Collegiate Professorship named for him, and an Alfred L. Edwards Scholarship. The National Economic Association also established the Alfred Edwards Award for service to that organization.
