= Augustin Fosu =

Ghanaian development economist

Augustin Kwasi Fosu
- Born: Ghana
- Education: Lawrence University (B.A.); Northwestern University (M.A., Ph.D.)
- Occupation: Development economist
- Employer: University of Ghana
- Known for: Research on economic growth, poverty, inequality, and governance in Africa
- Title: Professor, Institute of Statistical, Social and Economic Research (ISSER)

Augustin Kwasi FOSU is an internationally renowned Ghanaian economist known for his research on economic growth, poverty, inequality, governance, and development policy, particularly within the African context. He is a professor at the Institute of Statistical, Social and Economic Research (ISSER) at the University of Ghana, and an Extraordinary Professor at the Economic and Management Sciences at the University of Pretoria in South Africa. He has held academic and policy positions with the African Economic Research Consortium (AERC), the United Nations Economic Commission for Africa (UNECA), and the United Nations University World Institute for Development Economics Research (UNU-WIDER), in addition to teaching at universities in the United States.

== Early life and education ==
Fosu earned his bachelor's degree from Lawrence University in the United States in 1973, graduating cum laude overall and with distinction in both economics and mathematics, and was elected to the Phi Beta Kappa honors society. He completed his Master of Arts and Doctor of Philosophy (PhD) in economics at Northwestern University, USA, in 1975 and 1979, respectively.

== Academic and professional career ==
Fosu began his academic career in the United States, teaching at Kalamazoo College and later at Oakland University, where he rose from Assistant Professor to Associate Professor in 1986 and to full Professor of Economics in 1993, and served as department chair. He also held a visiting associate professorship at the University of Rochester (1992–1993).

In 1998, he joined the African Economic Research Consortium (AERC) in Nairobi, Kenya, as Director of Research, a position he held until 2004. From 2004 to 2006, he served as Senior Policy Advisor and Chief Economist at the United Nations Economic Commission for Africa (UN-ECA) in Addis Ababa, where he also directed the Economic and Social Policy Division. He was subsequently appointed Deputy Director of the United Nations University World Institute for Development Economics Research (UNU-WIDER) in Helsinki, Finland, serving until 2013.

He has also held honorary and visiting academic appointments at Aalto University in Finland, as Distinguished Visiting Professor at the University of Johannesburg, and as Extraordinary Professor at the University of Pretoria in South Africa. From 2009 to 2016, he was a research associate at the Brooks World Poverty Institute, University of Manchester, and since 2011 he has been affiliated as a research associate with the Centre for the Study of African Economies, University of Oxford.

== Editorial and Advisory Roles ==
Fosu has served in several editorial and advisory capacities within the fields of development economics and public policy. Since 2013, he has been Editor-in-Chief of the Journal of African Trade and Managing Editor of the Journal of African Economies since 2002. He has also assumed membership of the editorial boards of numerous leading journals, including the Economics of Governance, European Journal of Development Research, Journal of Development Studies, Oxford Development Studies, World Bank Economic Review, and World Development. He has also played key advisory roles at both international and national levels. In 2021, he was appointed by the UN Secretary-General to the Committee of Experts on Public Administration.Since 2019, he has been invited annually by the Committee for the Prize in Economic Sciences in Memory of Alfred Nobel, the Royal Swedish Academy of Sciences, to nominate candidates for the Prize.

In Ghana, he has, inter alia, served on the President's Economic Advisory Council (2012), the Fiscal Responsibility Advisory Council (2019–2020), and the Eminent Panel for Ghana Priorities of the Copenhagen Consensus Center.

== Research and publications ==
Fosu is internationally recognized for his work on the interconnections between growth, inequality, and poverty. His 2017 article, Growth, Inequality, and Poverty Reduction in Developing Countries: Recent Global Evidence, published in Research in Economics, received the Elsevier Atlas Award for its global impact on development studies.

His research also covers institutions and development, the political economy of reform, export diversification, as well as debt and macroeconomic stability.

In addition to numerous journal articles, he has authored or edited more than a dozen books/volumes, including:

- Growth and Institutions in African Development (Routledge, 2015)
- Achieving Development Success: Strategies and Lessons from the Developing World (Oxford University Press, 2013)
- Development Success: Historical Accounts from More Advanced Countries (Oxford University Press, 2013)
- Poverty in Africa: Analytical and Policy Perspectives (University of Nairobi Press, 2009), with G. Mwabu and E. Thorbecke
- The Political Economy of Economic Growth in Africa, 1960–2000: Country Case Studies (Cambridge University Press, 2008), with B. Ndulu, S. O’Connell, J.-P. Azam, R. Bates, J. Gunning, and D. Njinkeu
- Post-conflict Economies in Africa (Palgrave Macmillan, 2005), with P. Collier

== Awards and recognition ==
Fosu has received numerous honors recognizing his academic excellence and policy impact. He received the Elsevier Atlas Award in 2018 at the University of Oxford and has been consistently ranked among the top 1% of economists in Africa and the top 5% globally in terms of research output and citation impact, according to IDEAS/RePEc. He is also listed among the world's top 2% of scientists based on publication citations. He is also ranked among Stanford University's list of the world's top 2% most-cited scientists. And ScholarGPS designates him as ‘Highly Ranked Scholar – All Lifetime’.

Fosu is a Distinguished Fellow of the International Core Academy of Sciences and Humanities and has delivered keynote addresses at major international institutions including the International Monetary Fund, World Bank, Brookings Institution, Harvard University, University of Oxford, and the African Union. In May 2008,for instance he gave the keynote address in Beijing, China, on Africa's economic development during a visit by African ministers.
