= Gregory Price (economist) =

Professor of economics in New Orleans

Gregory N Price
- Citizenship: United States

Academic background
- Education: University of Wisconsin-Milwaukee (MA), (PhD); Morehouse College (BA)
- Website: https://www.greaux.org/gregprice; Information at IDEAS / RePEc

Gregory N. Price is an American economist who is a professor of economics at the University of New Orleans, and a former president of the National Economic Association.

== Education and early life ==
Price grew up in New Haven, Connecticut. He graduated from Morehouse College and received his MA and PhD from the University of Wisconsin-Milwaukee.

== Career ==
Price taught at North Carolina A&T State University from 1993 to 2004, at Jackson State University from 2004 to 2007, at Morehouse College from 2007 to 2013, where he was Charles E. Merrill Professor and Economics Department Chair, at Langston University from 2013 to 2015, at Morehouse College from 2016 to 2019, and at the University of New Orleans since 2019. He has been president of the National Economic Association. His research interests include economic inequality, entrepreneurship, African economic development, and the economic performance of historically Black colleges and universities.

=== Selected publications ===
- Gyimah-Brempong, Kwabena, and Gregory N. Price. "Crime and punishment: And skin hue too?." American Economic Review 96, no. 2 (2006): 246–250.
- Price, Gregory N. "Economic Growth in a Cross‐section of Nonindustrial Countries: Does Colonial Heritage Matter for Africa?." Review of Development Economics 7, no. 3 (2003): 478–495.
- Elu, Juliet U., and Gregory N. Price. "Does China transfer productivity enhancing technology to Sub‐Saharan Africa? Evidence from manufacturing firms." African Development Review 22 (2010): 587–598.
- Price, Gregory N., William Spriggs, and Omari H. Swinton. "The relative returns to graduating from a historically Black college/university: Propensity score matching estimates from the national survey of Black Americans." The Review of Black Political Economy 38, no. 2 (2011): 103–130.
- Agesa, Jacqueline, Maury Granger, and Gregory N. Price. "Economics faculty research at teaching institutions: Are historically black colleges different?." Southern Economic Journal (2000): 427–447.
