= Bernard E. Anderson =

American academic

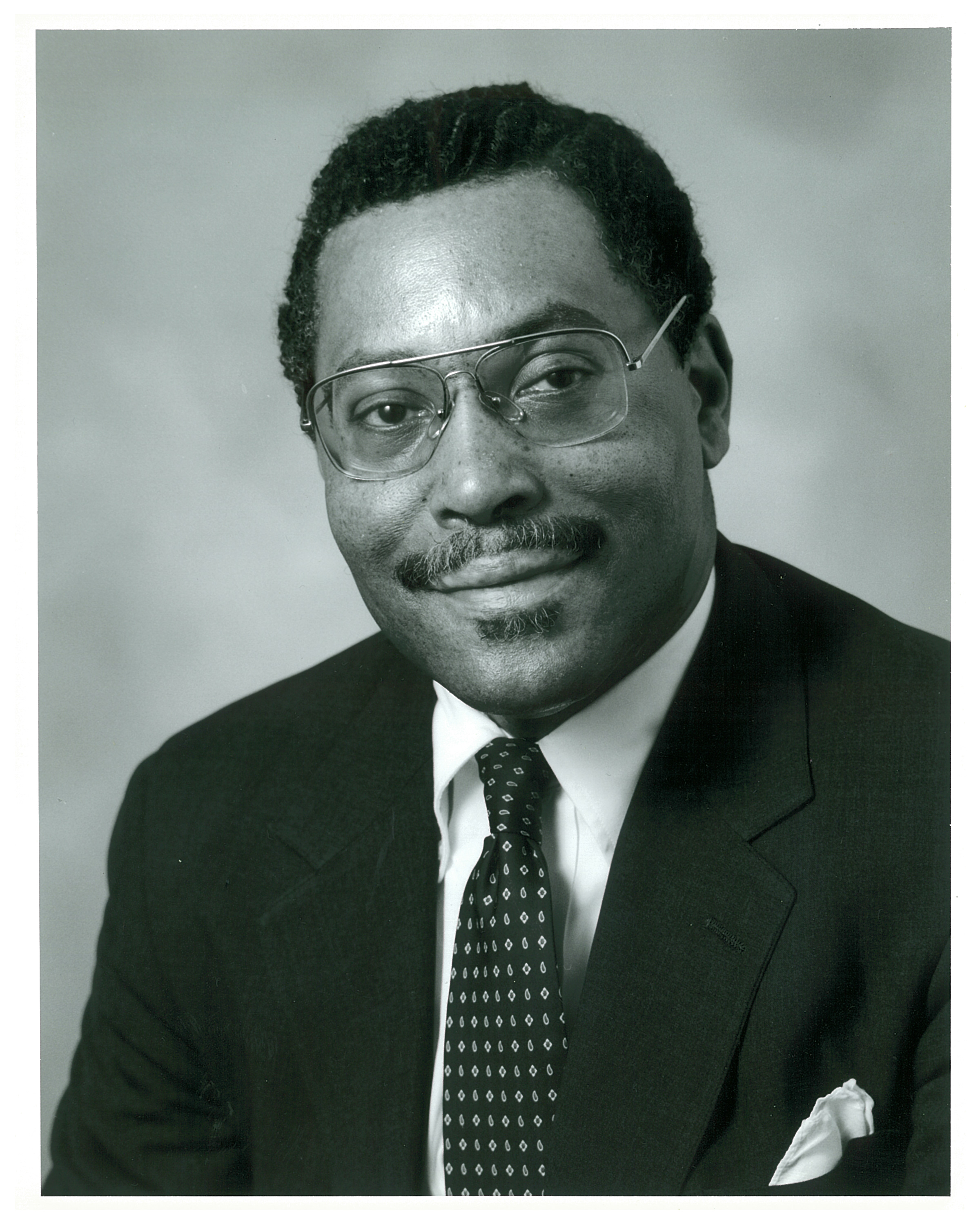

United States Assistant Secretary of Labor for Employment Standards
- In office Feb 24, 1994 – January 20, 2001
- President: William J. Clinton
- Succeeded by: Victoria Lipnic

Academic background
- Education: Livingstone College (BA) Michigan State University (MA) University of Pennsylvania (PhD)

Academic work
- Discipline: Industrial Economics, Labor Economics
- Institutions: Bureau of Labor Statistics; Wharton School; Rockefeller Foundation
- Awards: Samuel Z. Westerfield Award

Bernard E. Anderson is the Whitney M. Young, Jr. Professor Emeritus at the Wharton School of the University of Pennsylvania, where he was the first African American tenured professor, and the first to be awarded an endowed chair, the Whitney M Young, Jr chair. He was Assistant Secretary of Labor during the Clinton Administration, and is a member of the Board of Trustees of Tuskegee University. He was awarded the Samuel Z. Westerfield Award by the National Economic Association in 2003. He was also awarded the 2016 Living Legacy Award from the Philadelphia-based Urban Affairs Coalition. and the 2022 Labor and Employment Relations Association Distinguished Lifetime Achievement Award.

== Education and early life ==
Anderson was raised in Philadelphia, Pennsylvania and earned a B.A. degree in economics at Livingstone College and an M.A. degree in economics at Michigan State University, where he studied under Andrew F. Brimmer, his lifetime mentor, and the Ph.D. in economics from the University of Pennsylvania. He was the seventh African American to earn a Ph.D. in economics from the University of Pennsylvania, following Sadie T. M. Alexander, the first African American of either gender to earn a Ph.D. in economics in the U.S.

== Career ==
Anderson worked for the Bureau of Labor Statistics, and then became the second African American member of the Wharton School faculty, and the first to be awarded tenure there.

He was among the founders of the Caucus of Black Economists in 1969, now the National Economic Association, and has served as that organization's president. He was also inaugural chair of the Pennsylvania Intergovernmental Cooperation Authority, vice chair of the Manpower Demonstration and Research Corporation, chair of the Board of Trustees of Lincoln University, and vice chair of the Board of Trustees of Tuskegee University. He was also the Director for Social Sciences, the Rockefeller Foundation, 1978 t0 1985.

Anderson was appointed as Assistant Secretary of Labor for the Employment Standards Administration by President William J. Clinton in 1993, and was confirmed by the Senate for this position in February 1994. He returned to Wharton in 2001 as Whitney M. Young, Jr. Professor of Management.

=== Selected works ===
- Anderson, Bernard E. "The ebb and flow of enforcing executive order 11246." The American Economic Review 86, no. 2 (1996): 298–301.
- America, Richard F., and Bernard E. Anderson. Moving ahead: Black managers in American business. McGraw-Hill, 1978.
- Anderson, Bernard E., and Phyllis A. Wallace. "Public policy and Black economic Progress: A review of the evidence." The American Economic Review 65, no. 2 (1975): 47–52.
- Anderson, Bernard E. "How much did the programs help minorities and youth?." Employing the Unemployed. New York: Basic Books, Inc (1980).
- Anderson, Bernard E. "Worker protection policies in the new century." Journal of Economic Perspectives 14, no. 1 (2000): 207–214,
- Sawhill, Isabelle and Bernard E. Anderson, Youth Employment and Public Policy. New York: Columbia University Press (1977)
- Anderson, Bernard E., The Opportunity Industrialization Centers: A Decade of Community Based Manpower Development. University of Pennsylvania Press (1974)
