= Kwabena Gyimah-Brempong =

Professor of economics

- Born: July 24, 1949 (age 77); Kintampo, Ghana

Academic background
- Education: Wayne State University (PhD), 1981; University of Cape Coast (BA), 1974
- Website: http://economics.usf.edu/faculty/kgbrempong/; Information at IDEAS / RePEc

Kwabena Gyimah-Brempong (born July 24, 1949) is a Ghanaian American economist who is a professor of economics and economics department chair at the University of South Florida, and a former president of the National Economic Association. He serves on the editorial boards of Southern Economic Journal and the Journal of African Development.

== Education and early life ==
Gyimah-Brempong was born in Kintampo, Ghana, and received a BA with Honors from the University of Cape Coast in Ghana in 1974. He came to the United States in 1975 and earned a PhD in economics from Wayne State University in 1981.

== Career ==
Gyimah-Brempong has taught at the New College of Florida from 1981 to 1988, and at Wright State University from 1988 to 1994. Since 1994, he has been a professor of economics at the University of South Florida. From 2002 to 2004 he was the Economics Program, Director for the National Science Foundation. His research focuses on economic development in Africa. He has been president of the National Economic Association. In 2016, the Association for the Advancement of African Women Economists held a conference in his honor.

=== Selected publications ===
- Gyimah-Brempong, Kwabena. "Corruption, economic growth, and income inequality in Africa." Economics of governance 3, no. 3 (2002): 183–209.
- Gyimah-Brempong, Kwabena, and Mark Wilson. "Health human capital and economic growth in Sub-Saharan African and OECD countries." The Quarterly Review of Economics and Finance 44, no. 2 (2004): 296–320.
- Gyimah-Brempong, Kwabena, Oliver Paddison, and Workie Mitiku. "Higher education and economic growth in Africa." The Journal of Development Studies 42, no. 3 (2006): 509–529.
- Gyimah-Brempong, Kwabena, and Samaria Munoz de Gyimah-Brempong. "Corruption, growth, and income distribution: Are there regional differences?." Economics of Governance 7, no. 3 (2006): 245–269.
- Gyimah-Brempong, Kwabena, and Thomas L. Traynor. "Political instability, investment and economic growth in Sub-Saharan Africa." Journal of African Economies 8, no. 1 (1999): 52–86.
