= Kuralt =

Kuralt is the surname of several people:

- Anže Kuralt (born 1991), Slovenian ice hockey player
- Charles Kuralt (1934–1997), American journalist
- Jože Kuralt (1956–1986), Slovene alpine skier
- Wallace Hamilton Kuralt (1908–1994), American government bureaucrat from North Carolina
