= Wilson Caldwell =

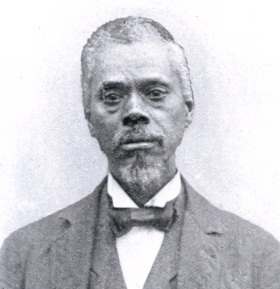
Photograph of Wilson Caldwell

Wilson Swain Caldwell (1841-1898) was a distinguished Civil War-era African American. Born into slavery on February 27, 1841, his mother, Chaney Atwater, was most likely the wife of November since 1833. His father was November 'Doctor' Caldwell, a slave of Helen Hogg Hooper, daughter of the Signer of the Declaration of Independence and the second wife of the University of North Carolina President Joseph Caldwell.

It is noted in the 1870 census that November listed both his father and mother as foreign-born, so Wilson’s paternal grandparents most likely came from West Africa. Wilson had a sister, Isabella, and a brother, John Caldwell. Wilson Caldwell grew up alongside the son of David Swain, Richard Caswell Swain (1836-1872), whereby Caldwell received some education—a rare opportunity for slaves then.

Wilson Caldwell was for many years head janitor at the University. He was a key member of a delegation that persuaded Union armies to spare the University during the Civil War, a time when many Southern cities were being burned to the ground. Fleeing the approach of Union troops, a small detachment of Confederate cavalry entered Chapel Hill on April 14, 1865. They intended to protect the University but continued to retreat after a two-day pause. Lacking further defenses, Chapel Hill citizens resolved to save the town by surrendering peacefully. Wilson Caldwell walked out with University President Swain, Judge W. H. Battle, and others to the "foot of Piney Prospect to meet the incoming detachment of [General Hugh Judson Kilpatrick's] cavalry, in order to claim protection for the town and the University." The presence of a leader from Chapel Hill's Black community was an important factor, and their request for protection "was promptly granted" (Battle, 1895).

After the Civil War Caldwell took advantage of the new freedoms afforded to former slaves, he founded a school for African Americans in 1868, was elected to the board of Commissioners of Chapel Hill, bought over 12 acres (49,000 m^{2}) of land, and served as a Justice of the Peace. He returned to work at the University in 1884 and remained head of the campus workforce until his death.

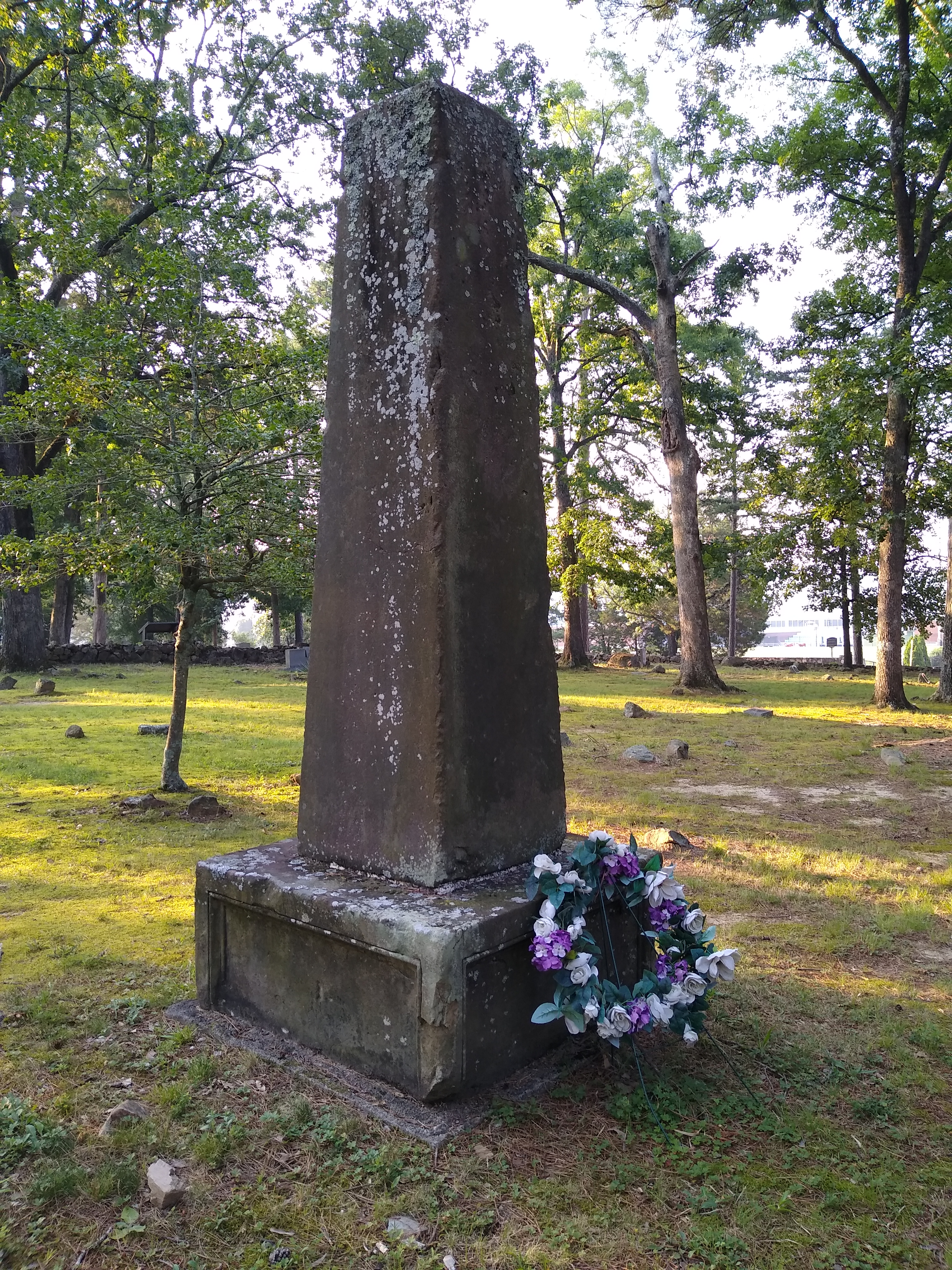
Monument to Wilson Swain Caldwell at the Old Chapel Hill Cemetery

Wilson Caldwell was married to Susan Kirby. They had twelve children, of whom five died in childhood from pneumonia, and two others predeceased their parents. Caldwell died in 1898 and is buried at the Old Chapel Hill Cemetery, beside his father, November Caldwell, and his son, Doctor Edwin Caldwell. The UNC class of 1891 had a monument placed on his grave, a large sandstone obelisk once used to honor University president Joseph Caldwell.
