= North Carolina Wesleyan University =

Methodist university in Rocky Mount, North Carolina, US

Coordinates: 36.017482°N 77.7761614°W

- Former name: North Carolina Wesleyan College (1956–2022)
- Motto: Wisdom and Courage through Christian Education
- Type: Private university
- Established: October 25, 1956; 70 years ago
- President: Evan D. Duff
- Students: 1,419
- Location: Rocky Mount, North Carolina, U.S.
- Campus: 200 acres; 200 acres (81 ha)
- Colors: (Blue & gold)
- Nickname: Battling Bishops
- Sporting affiliations: NCAA Division III, USA South Athletic Conference
- Website: ncwu.edu
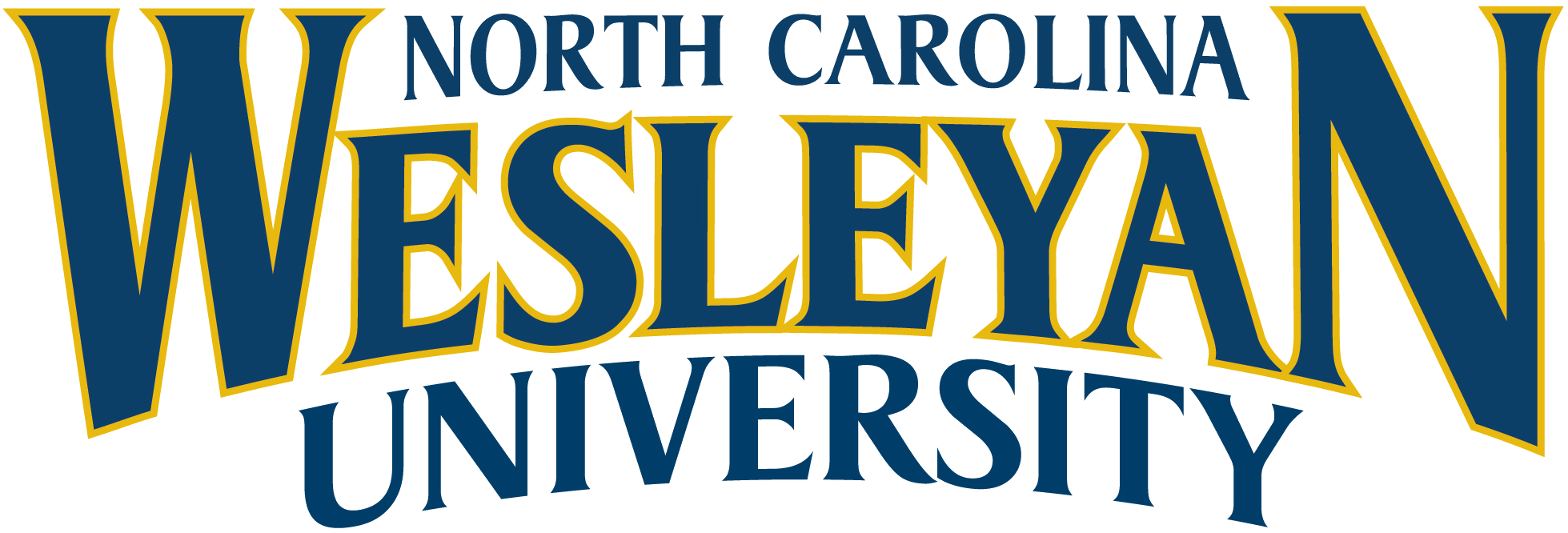

North Carolina Wesleyan University (NCWU) is a private Methodist university in Rocky Mount, North Carolina, United States. It was founded in 1956. North Carolina Wesleyan offers courses at its main Rocky Mount campus, as well as satellite advising office locations in Brunswick, Durham, Goldsboro, Greenville, Manteo, New Bern, Raleigh, Washington, Wilmington and Winston-Salem.

== History ==
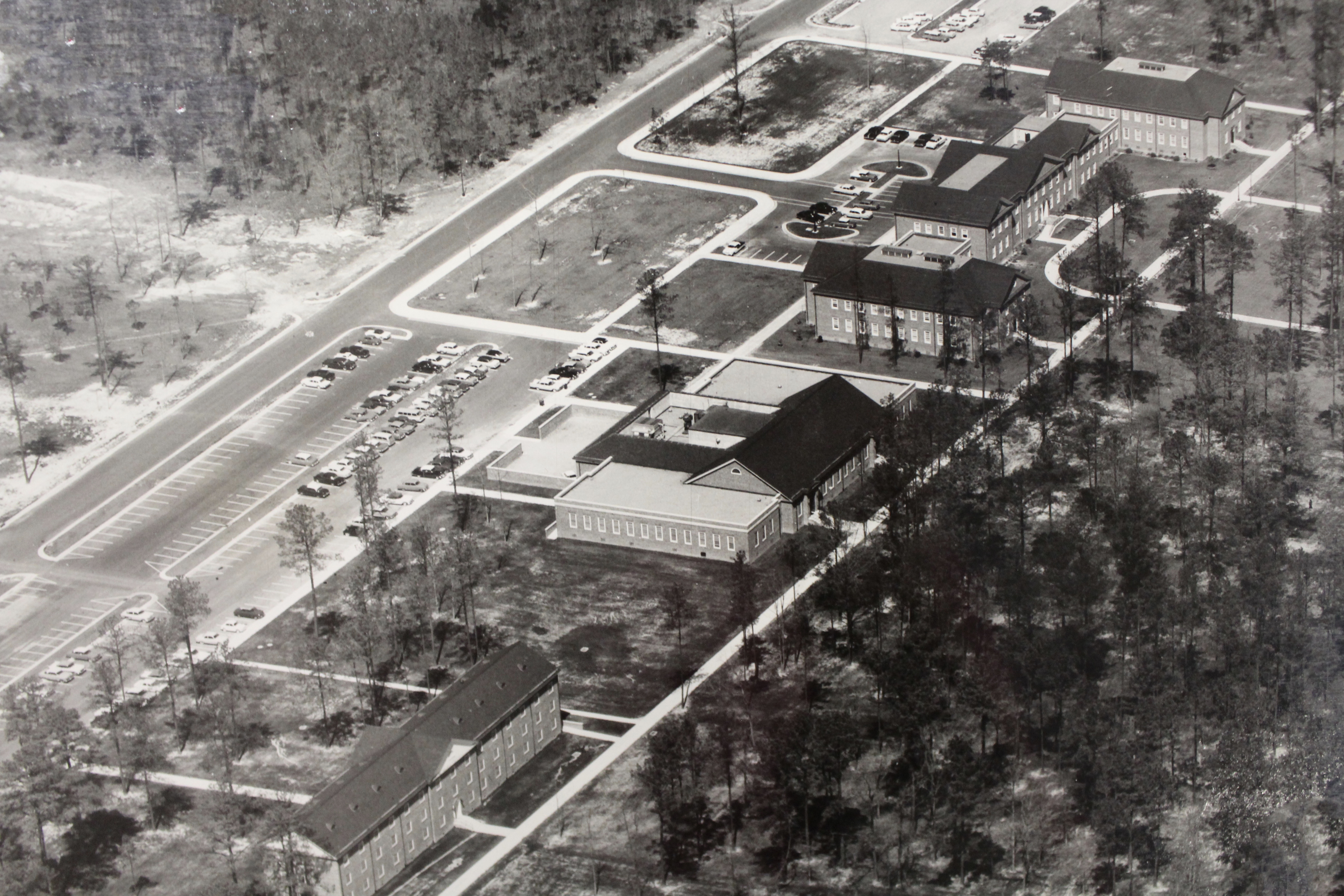
Aerial view of campus from the early 1960s

On May 14, 1956, the North Carolina Annual Conference of The United Methodist Church met in Goldsboro and approved a petition from the citizens of the city of Rocky Mount to locate a college in their community. The college was officially chartered by the State of North Carolina on October 25, 1956. Capital investments totaling approximately $2 million made possible the construction of the main buildings on the 200-acre site donated by the M.C. Braswell heirs of Rocky Mount, and four years later 92 students enrolled in the first class at North Carolina Wesleyan College. In 1964, 33 students received their degrees at the college's first Commencement. Nearly 9,000 students have earned bachelor's degrees in the arts and sciences and selected professional disciplines since its founding.

In 2015, Wesleyan added its first two master's programs. Seven years later, the college changed its name to "university" in 2022.

== Campus ==
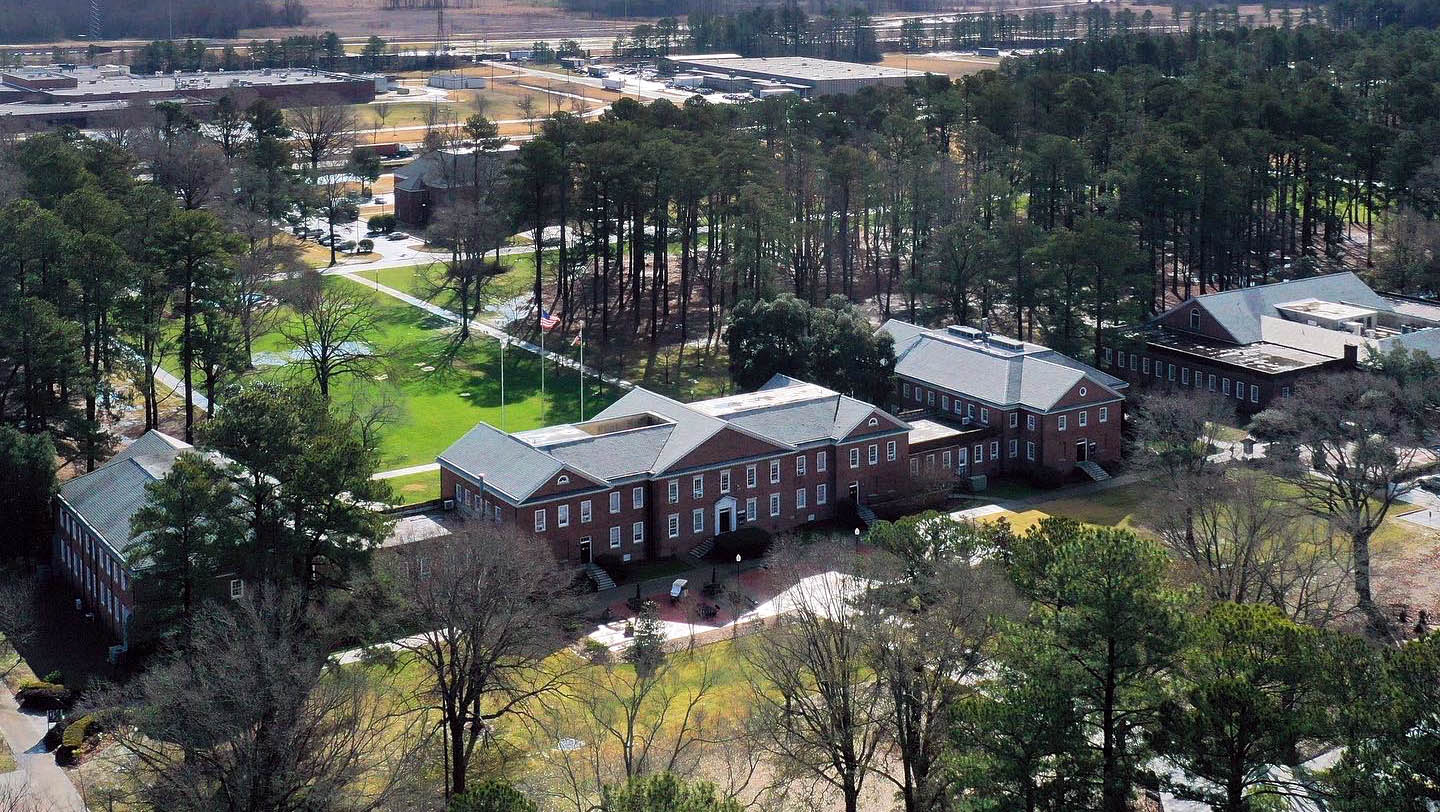
Aerial view of NCWU campus

The 200-acre (81 ha) Rocky Mount campus includes six residence halls, nine academic and administrative buildings, the Everett Gymnasium, The Dunn Center, and outdoor athletic facilities, including a soccer field, baseball field, tennis courts, Indoor Sports & Education Facility, artificial turf field, intramural fields, and softball field. There is also an on-campus Starbucks attached to the Pearsall Library. In addition to a residential campus, Wesleyan has developed a strong multi-campus Adult & Professional degree program with advising office locations in Brunswick, Durham, Goldsboro, Greenville, Manteo, New Bern, Raleigh, Washington, Wilmington and Winston-Salem in addition to the main campus in Rocky Mount.

== Academics ==
The university offers 33 undergraduate programs, 6 graduate programs, and 4 certificate programs. The university is accredited by the Commission on Colleges of the Southern Association of Colleges and Schools to award baccalaureate and master's degrees. It is also a member of the National Association of Schools and Colleges of The United Methodist Church.

=== Executive Residency Graduate Programs ===
NCWU offers Executive Residency Graduate Programs that offer a hybrid/blended format combining online and in-person instruction, tailored for both international graduate students studying in the U.S. and domestic students seeking flexible learning options. These 19-20 month programs are designed for students who like face-to-face instruction alongside the convenience of online coursework. As an F1-Visa Qualified Program, international students can continue their education in the U.S. and pursue a master’s degree with one concentrated residency weekend each semester on campus.

==== Taylor-Crocker Honors Program ====
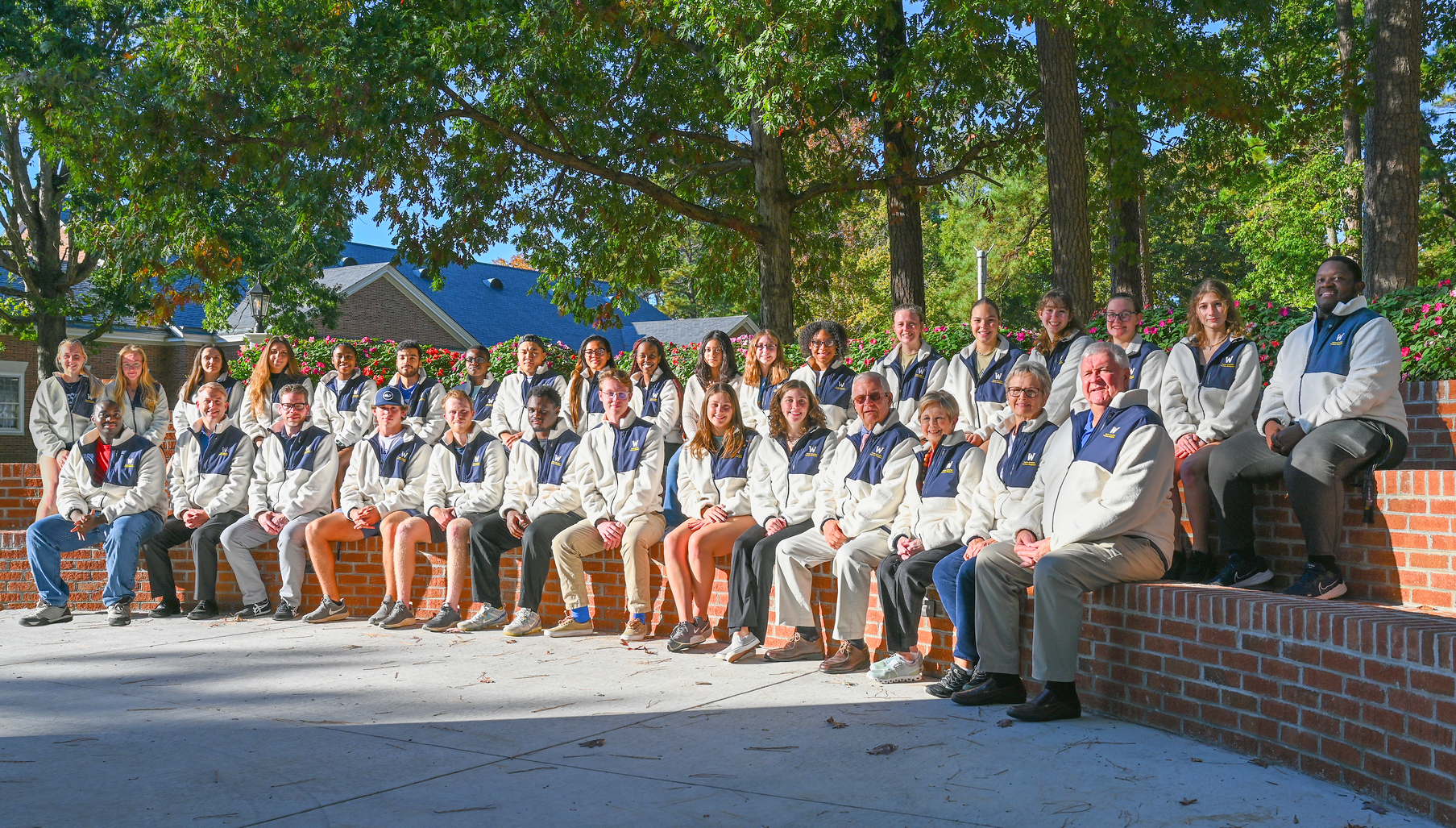
NCWU honors students

Students in the honors program take one honors course each semester during their sophomore and junior years. As seniors, students complete an Honors Project in some area of interest.

== Student life ==
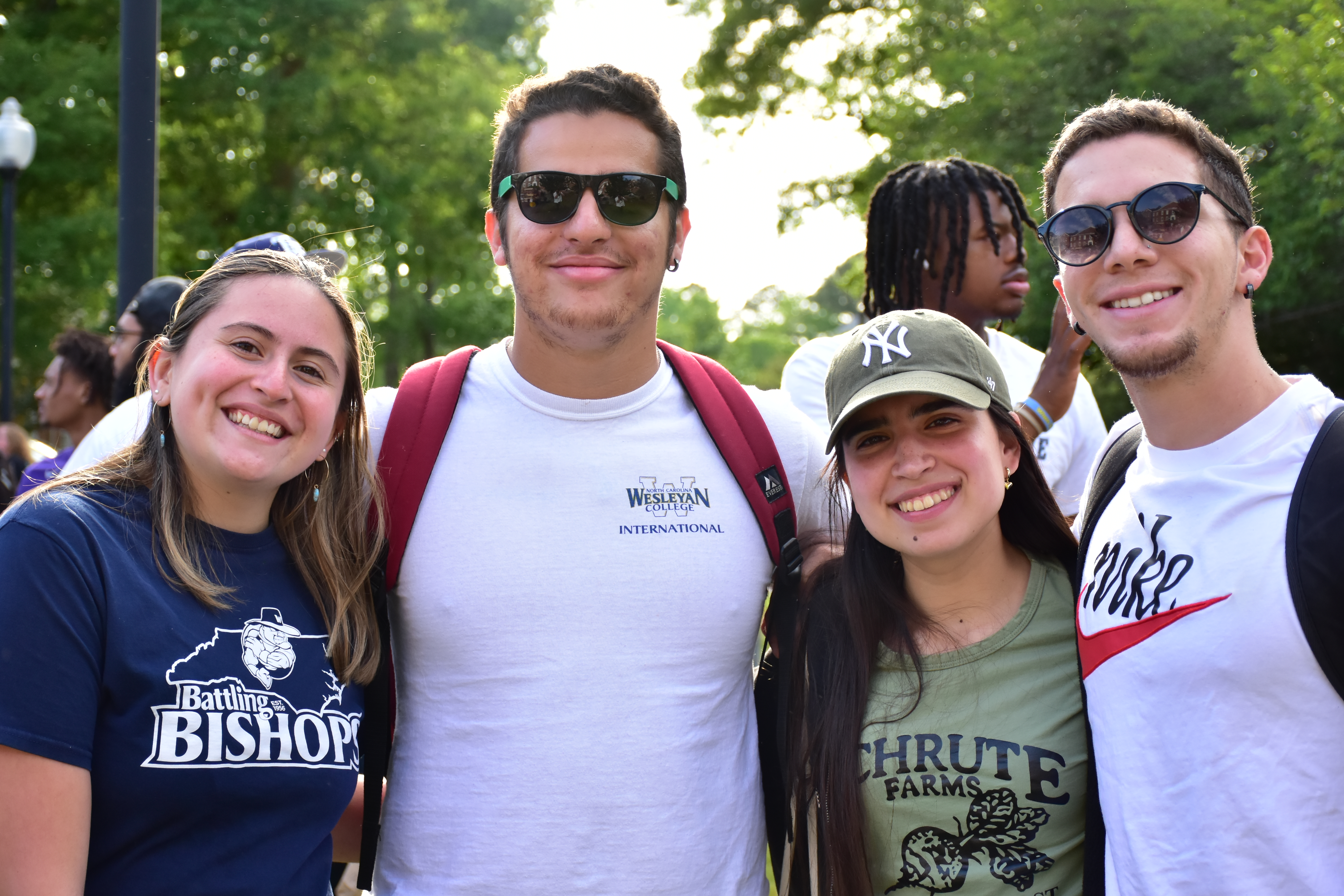
Students enjoying the annual end of year block party

As of fall 2025, 1,500+ students were enrolled.

=== Honor societies ===
- Alpha Phi Alpha - the first Black, Inter-Collegiate Greek-Lettered fraternity.
- Alpha Sigma Phi - the tenth oldest fraternity in the United States.
- Delta Phi Epsilon - a National Panhellenic Conference affiliated social sorority.
- Nu Gamma Phi - a affiliated non social fraternity.
- Omicron Delta Kappa - national honorary leadership fraternity.
- Phi Eta Sigma - National collegiate scholastic honor society for freshman.
- Pi Gamma Mu - International Honor Society for Social Sciences.
- Psi Chi - National Honor Society for Psychology.
- Sigma Tau Delta - International English Honors Society
- Kappa Mu Epsilon - National Mathematics Honor Society

=== Publications ===
- The Decree - student-developed newspaper
- WESmagazine - bi-annual magazine

== Athletics ==
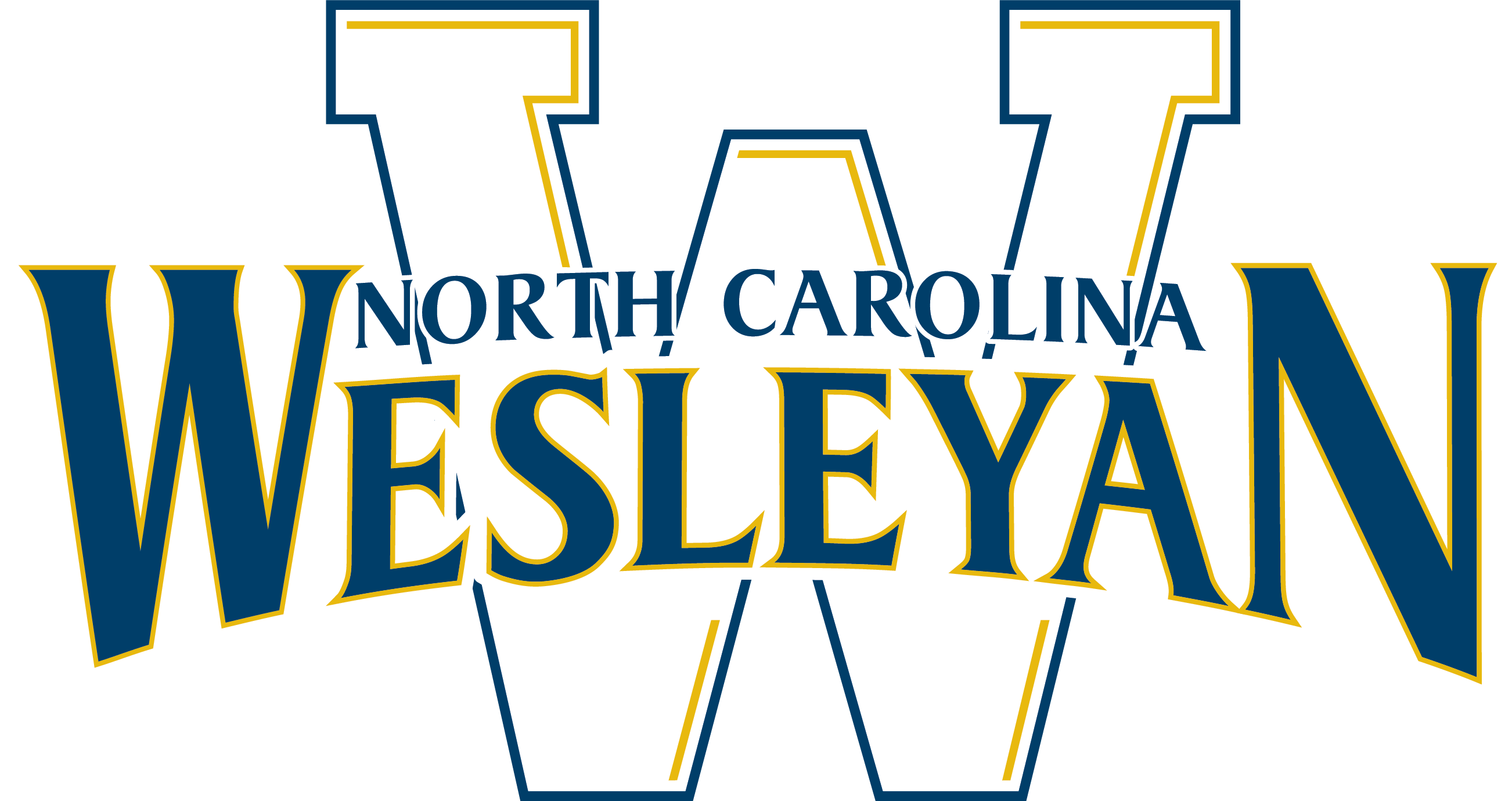
NCWU athletics logo

North Carolina Wesleyan is a member of NCAA Division III and the USA South Athletic Conference. They are known as the Battling Bishops with 18 Division III sports teams.

=== Championships ===
The baseball team has won two NCAA Division III national championships, winning in 1989 and 1999. The men's tennis team has 16 consecutive USA South Conference Regular Season and Tournament Championships. Overall, the university has 84 USA South Regular Season Championships, 77 NCAA Tournament Appearances, and 52 USA South Tournament Championships including three USA South Conference Championships in the 2023-24 season.

=== Football ===
The university's football program was established in 2005 with its home stadium at its Rocky Mount campus. The NCWU football team finished the 2007 regular season with an 8–2 mark, its best overall record in the program's short history. The Battling Bishops made it to the NCAA Division III Football tournament as the USA South champion, where they upset top-seed Washington & Jefferson in the first round 35–34. Not only was this Wesleyan's first post-season victory but it was also the first time the top seed lost to a number 8 seed since 1975. The university built a multiple use stadium on campus in 2022.

== Notable alumni ==
- Mamadou Danso, professional soccer player
- Natalie Edwards, former senior official with the U.S. Department of the Treasury and important whistleblower
- Jordan Grantz, college soccer player
- Marc Harris, accountant who was convicted in the United States on charges of money laundering and tax evasion.
- Damariscotta Helm, World Whistling Grand Champion of 2011
- Clay Earl Jackson, American actor and the fourth Maytag Repairman
- Jaine Lindo, professional soccer player
- Rhonda Vonshay Sharpe, feminist economist, academic, and founder and current president of the Women's Institute for Science, Equity and Race
