= Grantz =

Grantz is a surname. Notable people with the surname include:

- Gunnar Grantz (1885–1941), Norwegian rower
- Jordan Grantz (born 1992), American Samoan footballer

== Fictional characters ==
- Grantz, a fictional character in the light novel series The Saga of Tanya the Evil
