= James R. Kirk =

American businessman

Jim Kirk

Background information
- Also known as: Jim Kirk
- Born: James R. Kirk
- Origin: Dallas, Texas, U.S.
- Genres: Film/video/music production, special events
- Occupations: President & Creative Director for Corporate Magic, Inc.
- Years active: 1986–present
- Label: Capitol Records
- Website: www.corporatemagic.com

James R. Kirk is the President and Chief Creative Officer of Corporate Magic, a production company based in Dallas, Texas.

== Career ==
Early in his career, Kirk distinguished himself by creating and producing music for American Top 40 and American Country Countdown, in addition to jingles and promotional scores for Coca-Cola, the Boy Scouts of America, and other radio and television stations around the globe. He soon caught the attention of Roy Disney, who hired him in 1975 as creative director for TM Productions, where he created and produced more than 6,500 commercials and station IDs.

- Kirk, along with Fred Hardy, had started a jingle company in 1974. One jingle package they created, "The MOR Overture" would be remade in 1978 by JAM Creative Productions as "I'd Rather Be in Denver," which was created for KIMN in Denver, Colorado and incorporated several cuts from the original package.
- In 1980, Jim Kirk and the TM Singers spent three weeks on the Billboard Hot 100 with "Voice of Freedom". The single, with "The Star Spangled Banner" as a B-side, was released by Capitol Records. It peaked at number 71 in February 1980. All proceeds benefited the American Red Cross. The group also performed the theme song for the 1980 NBC television series Speak Up America.
- In 1984, Kirk created for WFAA-TV in Dallas, Texas an image campaign series entitled "The Spirit of Texas." The success of that campaign led TM Communications and its successor, TM Century, to distribute the campaign series, first to the other Belo stations and then to other television stations well into the 1990s. WFAA carried the musical logo through several packages until 2014, when it adopted a uniform theme from its new owner, Gannett Company (later Tegna Inc.).
- In 1986, Kirk left TM Productions with partner Buddy Scott to start Corporate Magic, a production company specializing in corporate events.
- In 1997, Kirk created and produced the widely acclaimed syndicated program American Moments, starring Charles Kuralt and James Earl Jones.
- In 2000, Gaylord Entertainment purchased Corporate Magic from Kirk, who continues to lead as its president and chief creative officer.

== Corporate Magic ==
Corporate Magic is a communications and event production firm, producing shows for companies including Aflac, Boeing, Chevrolet, Coca-Cola, Ford Motor, IBM, Kraft, the National Football League, Nortel, Procter & Gamble, Prudential, Rite Aid and Sherwin-Williams.

Corporate Magic has also staged productions for musical acts Garth Brooks, Keith Urban, Faith Hill, Sting, Toby Keith, Sheryl Crow, The Jonas Brothers, Kelly Clarkson and Carrie Underwood.

On June 6, 2010, Jim Kirk reached an agreement to reacquire Corporate Magic from Gaylord Entertainment. Terms of the transaction were not released.
