= Eugenics Board of North Carolina =

State Board of North Carolina, U.S.

The Eugenics Board of North Carolina (EBNC) was a State Board of the U.S. state of North Carolina formed in July 1933 by the North Carolina State Legislature by the passage of House Bill 1013, entitled "An Act to Amend Chapter 34 of the Public Laws of 1929 of North Carolina Relating to the Sterilization of Persons Mentally Defective". This Bill formally repealed a 1929 law, which had been ruled as unconstitutional by the North Carolina Supreme Court earlier in the year.

Over time, the Board shifted their focus to include sterilizations. Their original purpose was to oversee the practice of sterilization as it pertained to inmates or patients of public-funded institutions that were judged to be 'mentally defective or feeble-minded' by authorities. The majority of these sterilizations were coerced. Academic sources have observed that this was not only an ableist and classist project but also a racist one, as Black people were disproportionately targeted. Of the 7,686 people who were sterilized in North Carolina after 1933, 5,000 were Black. American Civil Liberties Union attorney Brenda Feign Fasteau said of the situation, "As far as I can determine, the statistics reveal that since 1964, approximately 65 percent of the women sterilized in North Carolina were Black and approximately 35 percent were White."

In contrast to other eugenics programs across the United States, the North Carolina Board enabled county departments of public welfare to petition for the sterilization of their clients. The Board remained in operation until 1977. During its existence thousands of individuals were sterilized. In 1977 the N.C. General Assembly repealed the laws authorizing its existence, though it would not be until 2003 that the involuntary sterilization laws that underpinned the Board's operations were repealed.

Today the Board's work is repudiated by people across the political, scientific and private spectrum. In 2013, North Carolina passed legislation to compensate those sterilized under the Board's jurisdiction.

== Structure ==
The board was made up of five members:

- The Commissioner of Public Welfare of North Carolina.
- The Secretary of the State Board of Health of North Carolina.
- The Chief Medical Officer of "An institute for the feebleminded or insane" of the State of North Carolina not located in Raleigh.
- The Chief Medical Officer of the State Hospital at Raleigh.
- The Attorney General of the State of North Carolina.

== History of the Board ==
=== 1919 ===
The State of North Carolina first enacted sterilization legislation in 1919. The 1919 law was the first foray for North Carolina into eugenics; this law, entitled "An Act to Benefit the Moral, Mental, or Physical Conditions of Inmates of Penal and Charitable Institutions" was quite brief, encompassing only four sections. Provision was made for creation of a Board of Consultation, made up of a member of the medical staff of any of the penal or charitable State institutions, and a representative of the State Board of Health, to oversee sterilization that was to be undertaken when "in the judgement of the board hereby created, said operation would be for the improvement of the mental, moral or physical conditions of any inmate of any of the said institutions". The Board of Consultation would have reported to both the Governor and the Secretary of the State Board of Health. No sterilizations were performed under the provisions of this law, though its structure was to guide following legislation.

=== 1929 ===
In 1929, two years after the landmark US Supreme Court ruling of Buck v. Bell in which sterilization was ruled permissible under the U.S. Constitution, North Carolina passed an updated law that formally laid down rules for the sterilization of citizens. This law, entitled "An Act to Provide For the Sterilization of the Mentally Defective and Feeble-Minded Inmates of Charitable and Penal Institutions of the State of North Carolina", was similar to the law which preceded it, although this new Act contained several new provisions.

In contrast to the 1919 law, which had mandated sterilization for the "improvement of the mental, moral or physical condition of any inmate", the new law added a new and far-reaching condition: "Or for the public good." This condition, expanding beyond the individual to greater considerations of society, would be built on in the ensuing years.

The 1929 law also expanded the review process to four reviewers, namely: The Commissioner of Charities and Public Welfare of North Carolina, The Secretary of the State Board of Health of North Carolina, and the Chief Medical Officers of any two institutions for the "feeble-minded or insane" for the State of North Carolina.

Lastly, the new law also explicitly stated that sterilization, where performed under the Act's guidelines, would be lawful and that any persons who requested, authorized or directed proceedings would not be held criminally or civilly liable for actions taken. Under the 1929 law, 49 recorded cases took place in which sterilization was performed.

=== 1933–1971 ===
In 1933, the North Carolina State Supreme Court heard Brewer v. Valk, an appeal from Forsyth County Superior Court, in which the Supreme Court upheld that the 1929 law violated both the U.S. Constitution's 14th Amendment and Article 1, Section 17 of the 1868 North Carolina State Constitution. The Supreme Court noted that property rights required due process, specifically a mechanism by which notice of action could be given, and hearing rights established so that somebody subject to the sterilization law had the opportunity to appeal their case. Under both the U.S. Constitution and the N.C. State Constitution in place at the time, the Supreme Court ruled that the 1929 law was unconstitutional as no such provisions existed in the law as written.

The North Carolina General Assembly went on in the wake of Brewer v. Valk to enact House Bill 1013, removing the constitutional objections to the law, thereby forming the Eugenics Board and creating the framework which would remain in force for over thirty years. The Board was granted authority over all sterilization proceedings undertaken in the State, which had previously been devolved to various governing bodies or heads of penal and charitable institutions supported in whole or in part by the State.

A study from Gregory N. Price, William Darity Jr., and Rhonda V. Sharpe argues that from 1958 to 1968, sterilization in North Carolina was specifically targeted towards Black Americans, with the intended effect of racial eugenics. Sharpe, of the Women's Institute for Science, Equity, and Race, argues that this is an example of the need to disaggregate data that might otherwise overlook the experiences of Black women.

=== 1971–1977 ===
In the 1970s the Eugenics Board was moved around from department to department, as sterilization operations declined in the state. In 1971, an act of the legislature transferred the EBNC to the then newly created Department of Human Resources (DHR), and the secretary of that department was given managerial and executive authority over the board.

Under a 1973 law, the Eugenics Board was transformed into the Eugenics Commission. Members of the commission were appointed by the governor, and included the director of the Division of Social and Rehabilitative Services of the DHR, the director of Health Services, the chief medical officer of a state institution for the feeble-minded or insane, the chief medical officer of the DHR in the area of mental health services, and the state attorney general.

In 1974 the legislature transferred to the judicial system the responsibility for any proceedings.

1976 brought a new challenge to the law with the case of In re Sterilization of Joseph Lee Moore in which an appeal was heard by the North Carolina Supreme Court. The petitioner's case was that the court had not appointed counsel at State expense to advise him of his rights prior to sterilization being performed. While the court noted that there was discretion within the law to approve a fee for the service of an expert, it was not constitutionally required. The court went on to declare that the involuntary sterilization of citizens for the public good was a legitimate use of the police power of the state, further noting that "The people of North Carolina have a right to prevent the procreation of children who will become a burden on the state." The ruling upholding the constitutionality was notable in both its relatively late date (many other States had ceased performing sterilization operations shortly after WWII) and its language justifying state intervention on the grounds of children being a potential burden to the public.

The Eugenics Commission was formally abolished by the legislature in 1977.

=== 2000-present ===
In 2003, the N.C. General Assembly formally repealed the last involuntary sterilization law, replacing it with one that authorizes sterilization of individuals unable to give informed consent only in the case of medical necessity. The law explicitly ruled out sterilizations "solely for the purpose of sterilization or for hygiene or convenience."

== Justification of Eugenics Policy ==
=== Legal ===
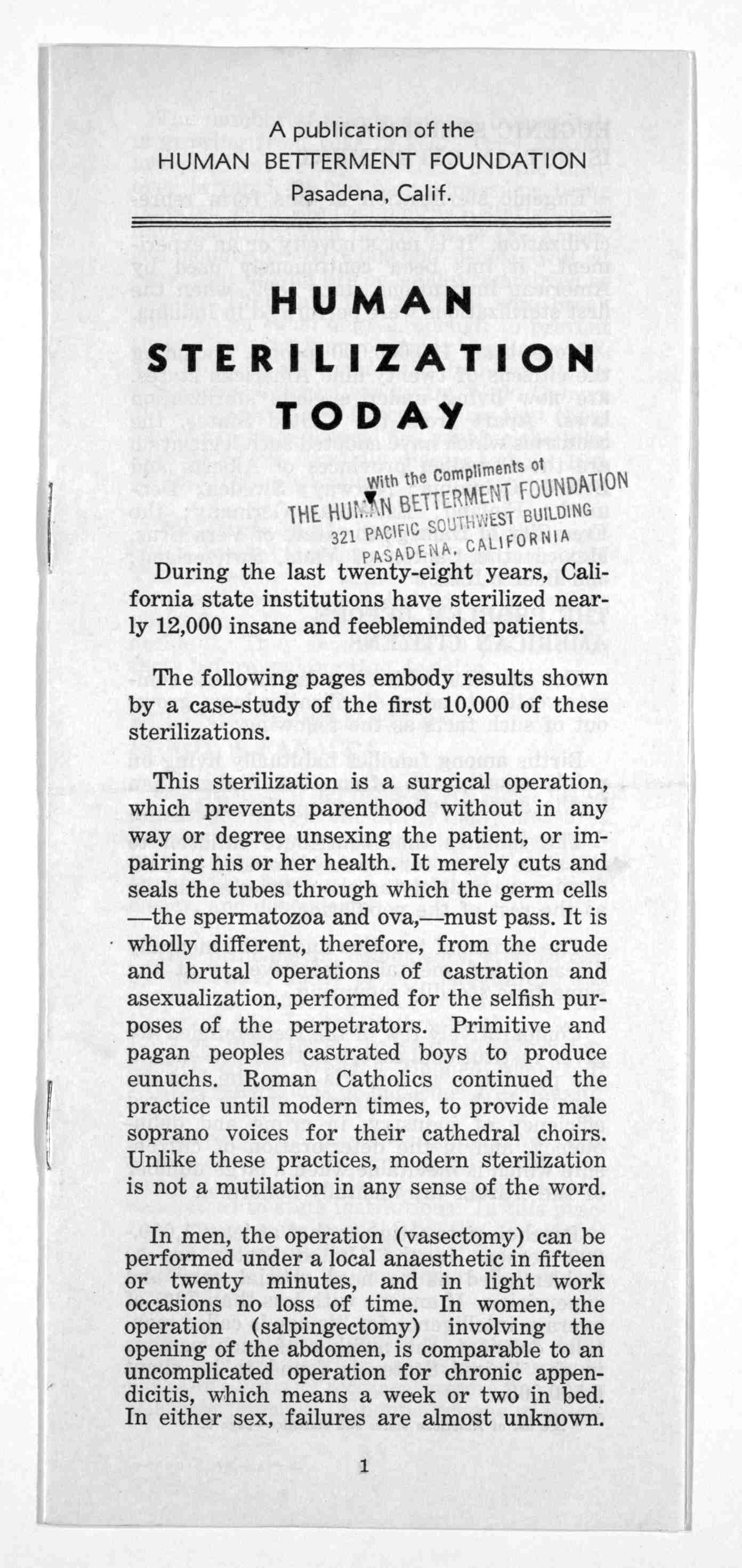
Human Sterilization Today

At the time of the Board's formation there was a body of thought that viewed the practice of eugenics as both necessary for the public good and for the private citizen. Following Buck v. Bell, the Supreme Court was often cited both domestically and internationally as a foundation for eugenics policies.

In Buck v. Bell Oliver Wendell Holmes wrote, in support of eugenics policy, that

We have seen more than once that the public welfare may call upon the best citizens for their lives. It would be strange if it could not call upon those who already sap the strength of the State for these lesser sacrifices, often not felt to be such by those concerned, to prevent our being swamped with incompetence. It is better for all the world, if instead of waiting to execute degenerate offspring for crime, or to let them starve for their imbecility, society can prevent those who are manifestly unfit from continuing their kind. The principle that sustains compulsory vaccination is broad enough to cover cutting the Fallopian tubes.

Despite the Supreme Court rulings in support of eugenics as constitutionally permitted, even as late as 1950 some physicians in North Carolina were still concerned about the legality of sterilization. Efforts were made to reassure the medical community that the laws were both constitutionally sound and specifically exempting physicians from liability.

=== Public good ===
Framing eugenics as supporting the public good was fundamental to how the law was written. It was argued that both for the benefit of the private citizen, and for the costs to society of future possible childbirths, eugenics were a sound and moral way to proceed. This was stated in the Board's manual of policies and procedures, in which the practice was justified:

- Sterilization has one effect only—it prevents parenthood.
- It is not a punishment; it is a protection; and therefore carries no stigma or humiliation.
- It in no way unsexes the party sterilized.
- Sterilization is approved by the families and friends of the sterilized.
- It is approved by medical staffs, probation officers, and social workers generally wherever they have come in contact with patients who have been sterilized.
- It permits patients, who would otherwise be confined to institutions during the fertile period of life, to return to their homes and friends.
- The records show that many moron girls paroled from institutions after sterilization have married and are happy and succeeding fairly well. They could never have managed and cared for children, to say nothing of the possible inheritance and fate of such children.
- Homes are kept together by sterilization of husband or wife in many mild cases of mental disease, thus removing the dread by the normal spouse of the procreation of a defective child and permitting normal marital companionship.
- There is no discovery Vitally affecting the life, happiness and well-being of the human race in the last quarter of a century about which intelligent people know less than they know about modern sterilization. The operation is simple; it removes no organ or tissue of the body. It has no effect on the patient except to prevent parenthood. Under conservative laws, sanely and equitably administered, these discoveries developed by the medical profession now offer to the mentally ill, feeble-minded, and epileptic the protection of sterilization.
No Place For Sentimentality

There can be no place for sentimentality in solving the problems of the mental health of our citizens. We would be less than human were we to feel no compassion for our unfortunates. But it is a peculiar paradox of human nature that while the best stock of our people is being lost on the battle fronts of the world, we make plans for the betterment and the coddling of our defectives.

— Evangeline Davis, The Charlotte News, March 29, 1945

In the press, opinion articles were published arguing for a greater use of eugenics, in which many of the reasons above were cited as justification. Even the Winston-Salem Journal, which would be a significant force in illuminating North Carolina's past eugenics abuses in the modern era, was not immune. In 1948 the newspaper published an editorial entitled "The Case for Sterilization - Quantity vs. Quality" that went into great detail extolling the virtues of 'breeding' for the general public good.

North Carolina's Selective Sterilization Law

Protects ...

- its mentally handicapped men and women
- the children of future generations
- and the community at large

It Saves ...

- thousands of taxpayer dollars
- needless human tragedy
- wasted lives

— 'You Wouldn't Expect ... ', Human Betterment League, 1950

Proponents of eugenics did not restrict its use to the 'feeble-minded'. In many cases, more ardent authors included the blind, deaf-mutes, and people with diseases like heart disease or cancer in the general category of those who should be sterilized. The argument was twofold; that parents likely to give birth to 'defective' children should not allow it, and that healthy children borne to 'defective' parents would be doomed to an 'undesirable environment'.

Wallace Kuralt, Mecklenburg County's welfare director from 1945 to 1972, was a leader in transitioning the work of state eugenics from looking only at medical conditions to considering poverty as a justification for state sterilization. Under Kuralt's tenure, Mecklenburg county became far and away the largest source of sterilizations in the state. He supported this throughout his life in his writings and interviews, where he made plain his conviction that sterilization was a force for good in fighting poverty. In a 1964 interview with the Charlotte Observer, Kuralt said:

"When we stop to reflect upon the thousands of physical, mental and social misfits in our midst, the thousands of families which are too large for the family to support, the one-tenth of our children born to an unmarried mother, the hoard of children rejected by parents, is there any doubt that health, welfare and education agencies need to redouble their efforts to prevent these conditions which are so costly to society?"

Among public and private groups that published articles advocating for eugenics, the Human Betterment League was a significant advocate for the procedure within North Carolina. This organization, founded by Procter & Gamble heir Clarence Gamble, provided experts, written material and monetary support to the eugenics movement. Many pamphlets and publications were created by the league advocating the group's position which were then distributed throughout the state. One pamphlet entitled "You Wouldn't Expect ..." laid out a series of rhetorical questions to argue the point that those considered 'defective' were unable to be good parents.

== Legacy ==
=== Number of operations ===
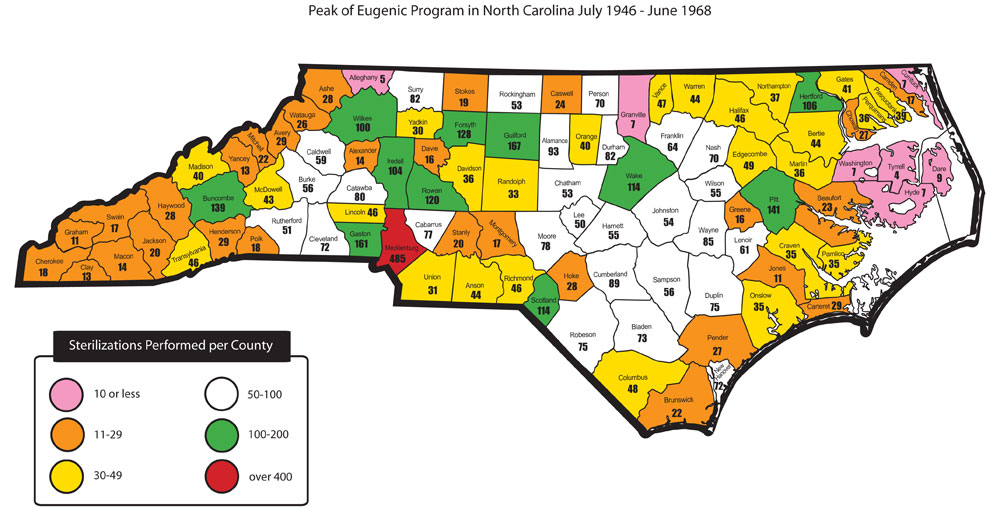
Peak of NC Eugenic Program July 1946 – June 1968

While it is not known exactly how many people were sterilized during the lifetime of the law, the Task Force established by Governor Beverly Perdue estimated the total at around 7,500. They provided a summary of the estimated number of operations broken down by time period. This does not include sterilizations that may have occurred at a local level by doctors and hospitals.

Sterilization Operations by Age / Date
Date of Sterilization	Age 10–19	Age 20–29	Age 30–39	Age 40–49	Age 50–59	Age Unknown	Total
Jan 1929 – Jun 1935	87	87	42	4	2	1	223
Jul 1935 – Jun 1940	380	205	112	11	1	0	709
Jul 1940 – Jun 1950	727	593	249	36	0	1	1606
Jul 1950 – Jun 1960	936	1201	745	93	8	0	2983
Jul 1960 – Dec 1968	686	717	260	23	1	0	1687
Jan 1969 – Dec 1974	174	118	26	2	0	0	320
Total	2990	2921	1434	169	12	2	7528

The report went on to provide a breakdown by county. There were no counties in North Carolina that performed no operations, though the spread was marked, going from as few as 4 in Tyrrell county, to 485 in Mecklenburg county.

Some research into the historical data in North Carolina has drawn links between race and sterilization rates. One study performed in 2010 by Gregory Price and William Darity Jr described the practice as "racially biased and genocidal". In the study, the researchers showed that as the black population of a county increased, the number of sterilizations increased disproportionately; that black citizens were more likely, all things being equal, to being recommended for sterilization than whites.

Poverty and sterilization were also closely bound. Since social workers concerned themselves with those accepting welfare and other public assistance, there was a strong impetus to recommending sterilization to families as a means of controlling their economic situation. This was sometimes done under duress, when benefits were threatened as a condition of undergoing the surgery.

What made the picture more complicated was that in some cases, individuals sought out sterilization. Since those in poverty had fewer choices for birth control, having a state-funded procedure to guarantee no further children was attractive to some mothers. Given the structure of the process however, women found themselves needing to be described as unfit mothers or welfare burdens in order to qualify for the program, rather than simply asserting reproductive control.

=== Personal stories ===
Many stories from those directly affected by the Board's work have come to light over the past several years. During the hearings from the NC Justice for Sterilization Victims Foundation many family members and individuals personally testified to the impact that the procedures had had on them.

==== Elaine Riddick Jessie ====
NCEB Case Summary: Elaine Riddick

—This thirteen year old girl expects her first child in March 1968 ... She has never done any work and gets along so poorly with others that her school experience was poor. Because of Elaine's inability to control herself, and her promiscuity - there are community reports of her "running around" and out late at night unchaperoned, the physician has advised sterilization ... This will at least prevent additional children from being born to this child who cannot care for herself, and can never function in any way as a parent.

— "Against Their Will", Winston-Salem Journal

Elaine Riddick was born in Perquimans County, North Carolina. Born into a poor family, one of seven children, the family was split up by the County Welfare department after her parents were deemed to be unfit. Elaine and one sister were sent to live with her grandmother, while the remaining five were sent to an orphanage. It was shortly after this family upheaval, when Elaine was 13, that she was raped by a 20-year-old man with a history of assault and incarceration. Elaine subsequently became pregnant.

When the social worker, Marion Payne, assigned to the Riddick family found out that Elaine was pregnant, she pressured Elaine's grandmother into signing a consent form for sterilization (Riddick's grandmother, being illiterate, signed the form with a simple 'X' symbol). On March 5, 1968, when Elaine was 14 years old, she was sterilized by Dr. William Wylie Bindeman Jr, under the authority of the board. The procedure took place hours after Elaine had given birth to a son. Riddick learned only years later the extent of the procedure, testifying to its effect over her life in a lawsuit brought against the state of North Carolina with the assistance of the ACLU in 1974. She cited failed relationships, physical pain and suffering, and psychological trauma. Riddick's lawsuit did not end in success; a jury found against her, and the United States Supreme Court refused to hear her case. It would not be until the hearings of the NC Justice for Sterilization Victims Foundation that her story was to be widely heard once more.

==== Junius Wilson ====
Junius Wilson was born in 1908 in North Carolina and grew up near Wilmington. In 1916 he was sent to the North Carolina School for the Colored Deaf and the Blind, a segregated state school in Raleigh that was the first southern school for black deaf children. Since this was a segregated school, students there were not given the resources of other schools. They were not taught American Sign Language and developed their own system of communication. This worked within the institution, but because it was their own, it did not travel, and so students and deaf from other schools were unable to understand them.

Wilson stayed there for six years, learning rudimentary sign language, until a minor infraction lead to his expulsion. While at home in Castle Hayne, Wilson came to the attention of the legal system when he was accused of the attempted rape of a relative. It is unclear whether the charge had merit—biographers speculated that his misunderstood behavior stemming from communication difficulties may have led to the situation—but what is not in doubt is that in 1925 Wilson was declared legally insane by a court and committed to the state Hospital for the Colored Insane in Goldsboro, North Carolina, which became Cherry Hospital in 1959. In 1932 he was surgically castrated under the provisions of the eugenics laws in place.

Wilson would remain committed to the state facility for decades. In 1990, he was given a new social worker, John Wasson. Wasson came to find out that not only was Wilson not mentally disabled, but that the hospital staff had known for years that he was not. To compound the situation, the legal charges against Wilson dating back to 1925 had been dismissed in 1970; for twenty years he had been committed to the hospital without legal justification. In interviews with hospital staff, Wasson found that it had been considered the most 'benevolent' course of action, since Wilson was thoroughly institutionalized at that point, with many of the same difficulties in learning and communication that had been his burden since birth.

Wasson instigated the legal challenge to Wilson's incarceration. In 1992 Wilson was formally declared a free man. Since he had no close relatives or family members able to care for him in his advanced age, a cottage was found for him on the grounds of Cherry Hospital. Wilson would live there until his death in 2001.

==== Mary English ====
Not all who testified before the committee were sterilized by the Eugenics Board directly. In many cases people who were sterilized were operated on by local clinics and doctors. It was argued that in many of these cases patients were not fully educated as to the nature of the procedure and were urged into it by doctors or social workers who were making judgements based upon their patients' economic situation. Young women of limited means who had multiple children were specifically targeted for sterilization by many case workers.

Mary English was one such case. In her personal testimony she explained that in 1972, she had been newly divorced with three children. She went to see a doctor at a Fayetteville OB/GYN clinic for some medical complaints. The doctor offered her entry into a program that would negate any need for future birth control. English signed the required paperwork, and was sterilized after the birth of her third child. It was years later, when she went back to the doctor to have the procedure reversed, that she found out it was permanent.

English went on to detail her struggles with depression and retold experiences of friends and neighbors who had gone through similar situations at the hands of their own doctors. As for the clinic at which English was sterilized, she claimed that it was still operating, though declined to name it, or the doctor responsible for her sterilization.

== Restitution ==
The Winston-Salem Journal's "Against Their Will" documentary, released in 2002, based in part on Joanna Schoen's research of the North Carolina Eugenics program, is credited with spurring public interest and demands for action to repeal laws and explore the possibility of compensation for affected people. This five-part series gave extensive background to the work of the Eugenics Board, with detailed statistics, victim's stories, and historical information on the broader Eugenics movement in the United States in the Post-WWII era.

Then-Governor Mike Easley offered an apology to victims of the policy in 2002. At the time, North Carolina was the third State in the nation to officially apologize for eugenics practices, following behind Virginia and Oregon though North Carolina was the first State to go beyond a formal apology to actively considering compensation in some form. Easley set up a committee to study the history of the Eugenics Board with instructions to provide recommendations on how to handle what it termed 'program survivors'. The committee recommended five specific steps:

- Establishment of a Nonprofit foundation to help find and support survivors
- Institute an outreach program from state Department of Health and Human Services to assist in encouraging
- Create a panel to adjudicate any claims to ensure that applicants were indeed affected by the program
- Create a fund to provide healthcare for certified survivors
- Provide educational benefits through the North Carolina University and Community College system to survivors and survivors' caretakers

The recommendations lay dormant in the North Carolina Legislature until 2008, when a study committee was appointed. The House Committee gave its own recommendations which in large part mirrored Easley's committee's findings though it went further, in establishing a suggested dollar figure of $20,000 compensation per surviving victim. The House committee also recommended training, the creation of memorials, and documenting survivor experiences, and the creation of a database to store sterilization records for future research. While the House committee recommended setting funds aside for these purposes, the Legislature did not grant funding in 2008. The house committee was co-chaired by State Representative Larry Womble, who has been a public advocate in the state house for victim's compensation. Womble announced he would be stepping down and not seek re-election after a serious car crash in late 2011.

In 2008, Beverley Perdue was elected Governor of North Carolina. As part of her platform she pledged to take up the sterilization situation. In 2010 Perdue issued an executive order that formed the North Carolina Justice for Sterilization Victims Foundation (NCJSVF).

The Task Force was made up of the following:

- Dr. Laura Gerald MD MPH (Chair)
- Fetzer 'Frank' Mills JD, retired Superior Court judge
- Phoebe Zerwick MS, lecturer at Wake Forest University
- Lenwood G. Davis PHD, Professor of History at Winston-Salem State University
- Demetrius Worley Berry JD, Attorney, Brotherton Ford Yeoman Berry & Weaver, PLLC

The Foundation recommended that compensation be raised to $50,000 per victim, in a 3–2 vote. They also voted for funds for mental health services and historical displays and exhibits documenting the history of sterilization in the state. It is not yet clear how many victims will be satisfied by the amount; many have granted detailed interviews that documented their severe emotional trauma in the wake of the procedures, and have been outspoken in demanding higher sums.

On April 25, 2012, North Carolina's Gov. Perdue announced that she will put $10.3 million in her budget proposal to allocate towards issues surrounding eugenics. The funds are intended to aid with $50,000 payments to verified North Carolina eugenics victims. The remainder of the monies will be used to support the continued efforts of the NC Justice for Sterilization Victims Foundation as they provide outreach and clearinghouse services to help Eugenics victims. Governor Perdue stated,

We cannot change the terrible things that happened to so many of our most vulnerable citizens, but we can take responsibility for our state's mistakes and show that we do not tolerate violations of basic human rights. We must provide meaningful assistance to victims, so I am including this funding in my budget.

Perdue's budget proposal is in accordance with the recommendations of the January 2012 final report issued from the Eugenics Compensation Task Force. The board suggested that living victims and those who were not deceased when verified by the foundation receive a tax-free, lump sum payment of $50,000. The N.C. Justice for Sterilization Victims Foundation reports that there is still an increase in the number of confirmed/verified eugenics victims. As of April 25, 2012, 132 people in 51 counties had been matched to the North Carolina's Eugenics program records.

In 2013, the General Assembly of North Carolina passed an appropriations bill to give compensation, up to $50,000 per person, to individuals sterilized under the authority of the Eugenics Board of North Carolina.
