= Edwin Caldwell =

American physician

Edwin Caldwell (August 12, 1867 – 1932) was an American physician who served patients in Central North Carolina around the turn of the 20th century. Caldwell is credited with discovering one of the first effective treatments for pellagra.

== Biography ==
Born in Chapel Hill, North Carolina, Caldwell was the son of former slaves Wilson Caldwell and Susan Kirby, and the grandson of November Caldwell, a slave owned by the wife of Joseph Caldwell, the first president of the University of North Carolina at Chapel Hill. Both Wilson and November Caldwell had worked as "college servants" (a euphemism for slaves employed as unpaid staff) on the UNC-Chapel Hill campus during the antebellum era.

When Edwin Caldwell was young, he helped clean chemistry labs at UNC where his father worked as a janitor after emancipation. He was described as a very bright boy, who was liked very much by the students at the university. He received his education at a free public school as a child in North Carolina. He also received private lessons as a child from students UNC, including Class of 1880 graduate Locke Craig, who later became Governor of North Carolina.

Caldwell attended Shaw University in Raleigh, North Carolina, from 1887 and graduated from Shaw's Leonard Medical School in the 1890–91 graduating class and going on to Osceola, Arkansas, in 1892. In between he went to practice medicine at Charlotte, North Carolina. Caldwell went on to pass the examination of the Arkansas State Medical Board in 1892, advertising medical practice in June, and then practiced for 17 years in Osceola, Arkansas. He was elected a member of the American Association of Progressive Medicine and the Medical Society of the United States.

He moved to Durham, North Carolina, and in November 1918, he married Minnie Stroud Caldwell, who was the widow of his late brother of E. B. Caldwell. Edwin Caldwell moved in with her to help take care of the children, and decided to marry her. Together they had one child, and named her Julia Elizabeth Caldwell.

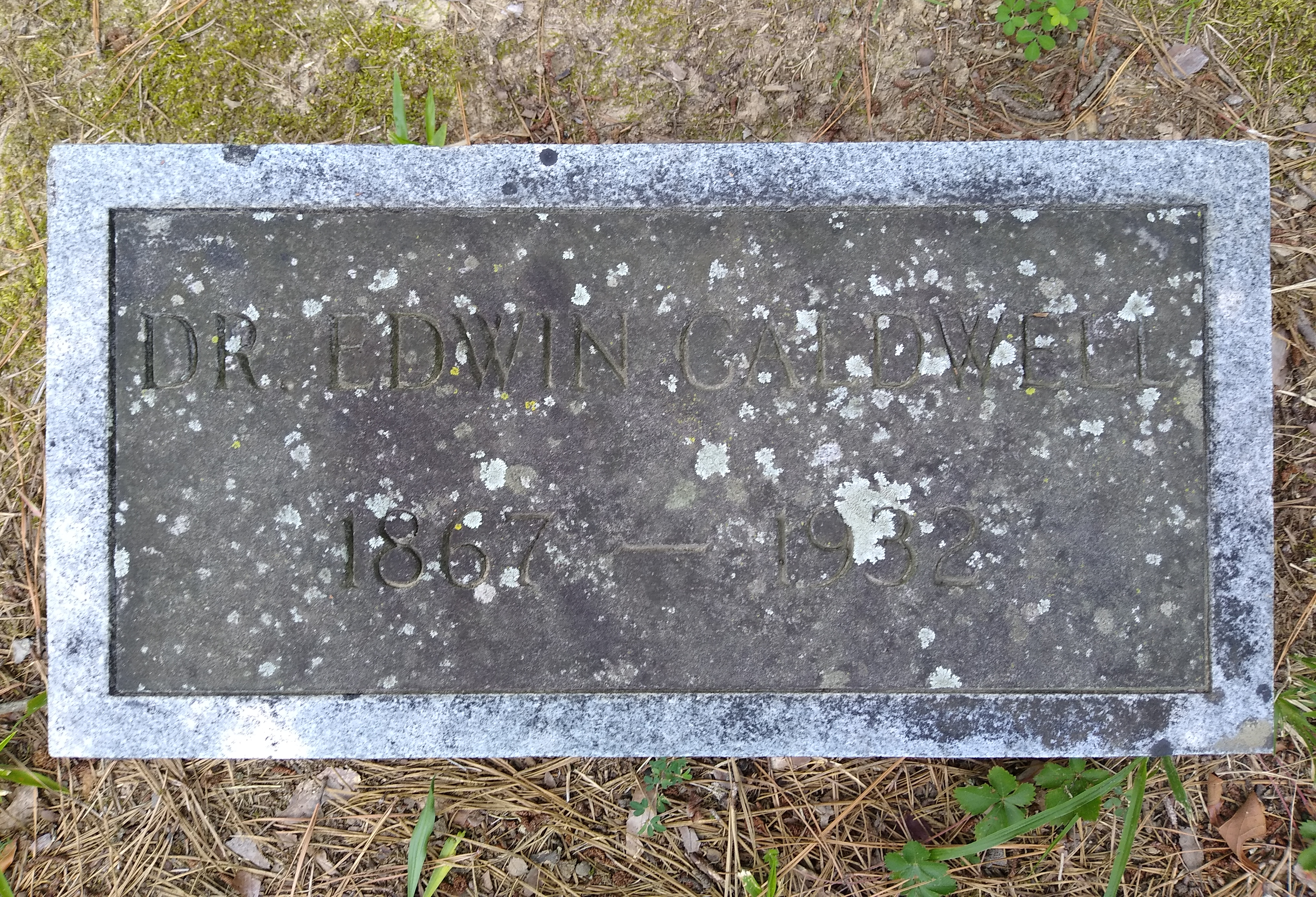
Caldwell's grave marker at the Old Chapel Hill Cemetery

Caldwell became an authority on pellagra, which is a nutritional disease caused by niacin deficiency. According to civil rights attorney and author Pauli Murray in her 1956 genealogical memoir Proud Shoes: The Story of an American Family, Caldwell successfully treated her maternal grandmother Cornelia Smith Fitzgerald for pellagra when Murray was a child. Murray also noted that Caldwell served white patients in Central North Carolina as well, but that social mores during the Jim Crow era discouraged whites from openly acknowledging that they had received health care from a black doctor. Caldwell died in 1932 and is buried in Section B of the Old Chapel Hill Cemetery at the University of North Carolina at Chapel Hill.
