= An American Moment =

An American Moment was a syndicated short-form television series, created by Dr. Prentice Meador, James R. Kirk and Neal Spelce, initially hosted by newsman Charles Kuralt and later by actor James Earl Jones.

The show consisted of 90-second vignettes, generally intended for use as inserts during local news programs, and focused on "small town America" and overlooked news stories. It was produced by an Austin, Texas based production company headed by Spelce, a longtime local newsman, based on an earlier similar program called Breakthrough that featured Prentice Meador, a Dallas minister and professor. It was carried by more than 70 stations throughout the United States. Kuralt, the series's first host, came out of retirement to take on the series. Kuralt described the program's content as "New England stone walls, cowboy hats, the birth of a foal on a ranch, totem poles and barber poles."

Kuralt died in 1997. He was replaced by James Earl Jones, who continued as host of the program until production ended in 1999. Charles Kuralt's American Moments, a compilation of vignettes from the series, was published by Simon & Schuster in 1998. Kirkus Reviews described the book as "[j]ust as hokey and sentimental as Kuralt’s broadcasts."

The Dolph Briscoe Center for American History at the University of Texas at Austin holds an archive of materials relating to the series.
