= Corporate Magic =

Corporate Magic, Inc.
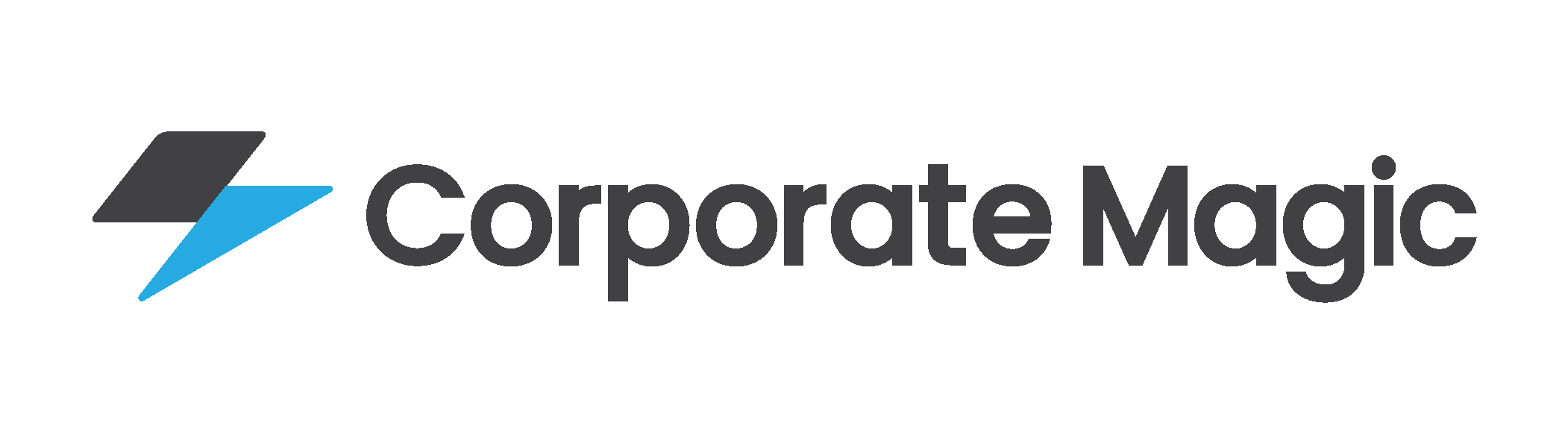
- Type: Private
- Founded: Dallas, Texas, United States (1986)
- Headquarters: Dallas, Texas (United States)
- Key people: James R. Kirk, CEO Jeff Kirk, Chief Operating Officer Martin Gillespie, Chief Financial Officer Stephen Dahlem, Senior Creative Director Brian Greenway, Director, Alliances & Business Development
- Website: http://www.corporatemagic.com

Corporate Magic, Inc., based in Dallas, Texas, is an event production and message development agency that specializes in one-of-a-kind projects. The agency is owned and led by CEO James R. Kirk.

Since its founding in 1986, Corporate Magic has orchestrated some of the biggest events in North Texas and around the United States. In November 2010, it directed the official groundbreaking ceremony for the George W. Bush Presidential Center at Southern Methodist University, featuring former President George W. Bush, former First Lady Laura Bush, former Vice President Dick Cheney and other dignitaries. Later that month, the agency produced the Grand Re-opening of the Gaylord Opryland Resort & Convention Center—one of the world's largest convention hotels—in Nashville, TN.

Corporate Magic is the official event producer of the North Texas Super Bowl XLV Host Committee. Other major projects include the Oklahoma Centennial Spectacular, Coca-Cola's Centennial, the Boy Scouts of America’s 100th Anniversary Jamboree, international product launches for Mazda, Land Rover and Jaguar, annual corporate gatherings and awards programs for Prudential Financial, Xango and Rite Aid, and several projects for the Dallas Cowboys.

On June 6, 2010, James R. Kirk re-acquired the agency from Gaylord Entertainment (NYSE: GET), roughly six years after the companies joined forces. Kirk re-purchased the 50 percent stake in Corporate Magic that was acquired by Gaylord in 2005, giving him 100 percent control over the company.
