= Jaine Lindo =

Sint Maartener footballer (born 1990)

Personal information
- Full name: Jaine Lindo
- Date of birth: 22 September 1990 (age 36)
- Place of birth: Willemstad, Curaçao
- Position: Midfielder

Team information
- Current team: Athletic Club of the Commonwealth
- Number: 12

College career
Years	Team	Apps	(Gls)
2007–2010	NC Wesleyan Battling Bishops	58	(2)
2014–2016	ASA Charge	31	(3)
2020–	Athletic Club of the Commonwealth	34	(2)

International career^{‡}
2018–	Sint Maarten	2	(0)

Managerial career
- 2011: Hood Blazers (assistant)
- ‡ National team caps and goals as of 13 October 2018

Jaine Lindo (born 22 September 1990) is a Sint Maartener footballer who plays for the Sint Maarten national team. Currently, he plays for Athletic Club of the Commonwealth in the Eastern Premier Soccer League in the USA.

== International career ==
Lindo made his international debut for Sint Maarten on 10 September 2018, in a loss to Haiti, in a qualifying match for the 2019–20 CONCACAF Nations League. Lindo entered the game at halftime. He made another appearance versus Dominica in November 2018.
