= Rhonda Vonshay Sharpe =

American economist

- Born: 1966 (age 59–60); New York City

Academic background
- Education: North Carolina Wesleyan College, B.A., Mathematics; Clark Atlanta University, M.A., Applied Mathematics; Stanford University, M.S., Operations Research; Claremont Graduate University, M.A., PhD., Economics
- Doctoral advisor: Cecilia Conrad
- Influences: William A. Darity Jr. Cecilia Conrad

Academic work
- Discipline: Feminist Economics
- Institutions: Women's Institute for Science, Equity and Race (WISER); Bennett College
- Awards: Rhonda Williams Prize (2004)
- Website: WISER website profile

Rhonda Vonshay Sharpe (born 1966) is an American economist who is the founder and current president of the Women's Institute for Science, Equity, and Race (WISER). She is a feminist economist who has been a faculty member at an extensive list of colleges and universities and served as president of the National Economic Association from 2017 to 2018.

== Early life and education ==
Sharpe was born in New York and moved with her parents to Virginia at a young age. She attended Highland Springs High School.

Sharpe studied mathematics at North Carolina Wesleyan College and Clark Atlanta University and was a graduate student in operations research at Stanford University. She completed her PhD in economics at the Claremont Graduate University in 1998 under the guidance of Cecilia Conrad. Her graduate committee consisted of Llewellyn Miller, John Angus, and Gary Smith.

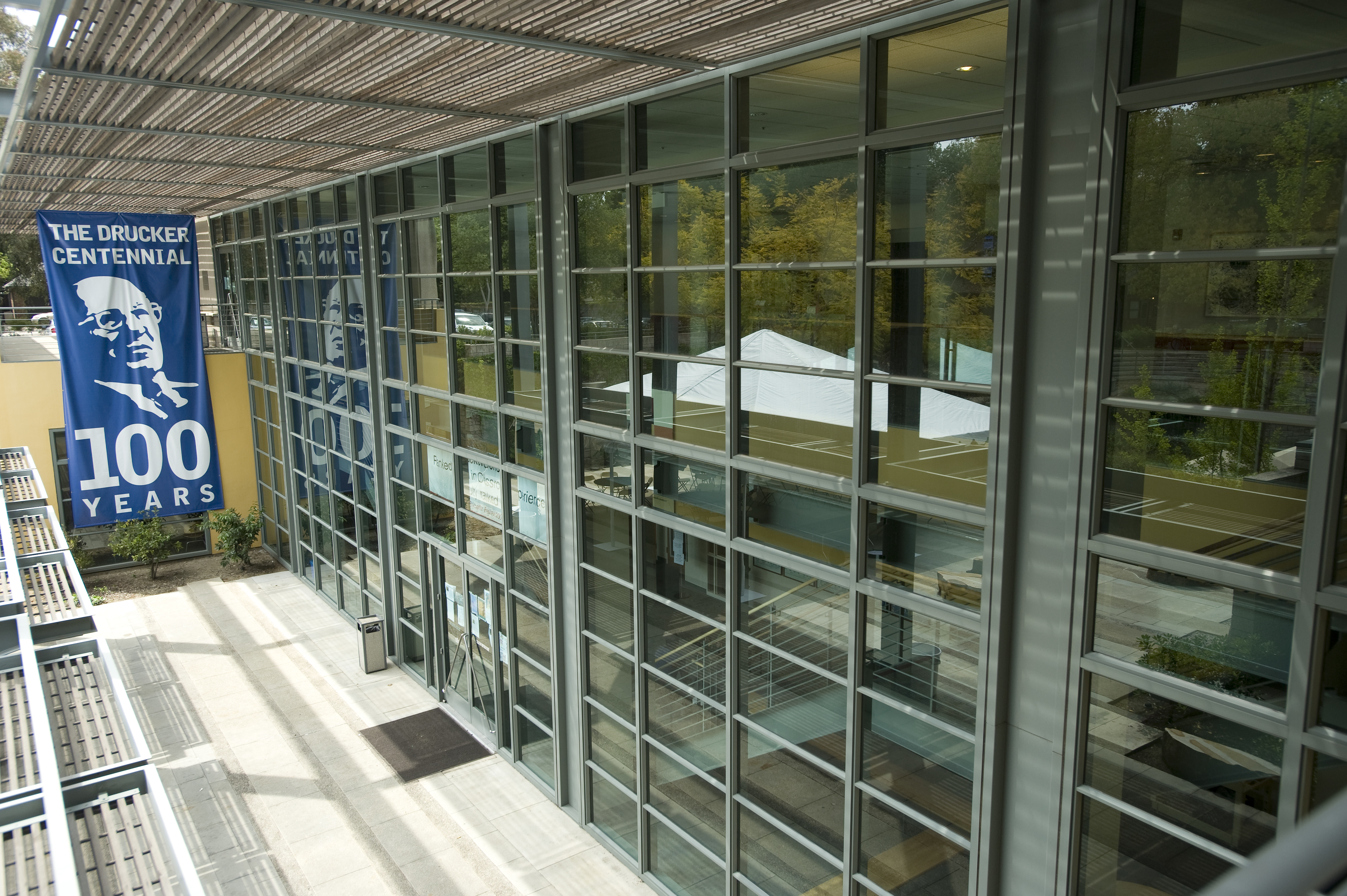
Claremont Graduate University, where Sharpe received her PhD.

== Career ==
Sharpe has taught at Barnard College, Bennett College, Bucknell University, Columbia University, Duke University, and the University of Vermont. She chaired the Department of Business and Economics at Bennett College from 2009 to 2012. From 2008 - 2014, she was associate director of the Diversity Initiative for Tenure in Economics (DITE), which she co-founded. In 2012, she left her tenured position at Bennett College.

Sharpe founded the Women's Institute for Science, Equity, and Race (WISER) on International Women's Day in 2016. WISER is a nonprofit, nonpartisan, 501(c)3 research institute specifically devoted to the study of Asian, Black, Hispanic, and Native American women. In particular, Sharpe advocates for the disaggregation of data to examine outcomes separately for women in each group.

Sharpe also served as president of the National Economic Association from 2017 to 2018 and holds a position on the board of the International Association for Feminist Economics. She is an editor for The Review of Black Political Economy.

== Selected works ==
- Coleman, Major G., William A. Darity Jr, and Rhonda V. Sharpe. "The Moral Hazard of Discrimination Reports." American Journal of Economics and Sociology 67, no. 2 (2008): 149–175.
- Conrad, Cecilia A., and Rhonda V. Sharpe. "The impact of the California Civil Rights Initiative (CCRI) on university and professional school admissions and the implications for the California economy." The Review of Black Political Economy 25, no. 1 (1996): 13–59.
- Zhang, Li, Rhonda Vonshay Sharpe, Shi Li, and William A. Darity Jr. "Wage differentials between urban and rural-urban migrant workers in China." China Economic Review 41 (2016): 222–233.
- Sharpe, Rhonda Vonshay, and Omari H. Swinton. "Beyond anecdotes: A quantitative examination of Black women in academe." The Review of Black Political Economy 39, no. 3 (2012): 341–352.
- Blalock, Sacha D., and Rhonda Vonshay Sharpe. "You go girl!: Trends in educational attainment of Black women." In Black female undergraduates on campus: Successes and challenges. Emerald Group Publishing Limited, 2012.
- Sharpe, Rhonda Vonshay. "We've Built the Pipeline: What's the Problem and What's Next?"
