= Wallace Kuralt =

American public servant (1908–1994)

- Born: Wallace Hamilton Kuralt; 1908; Springfield, Massachusetts
- Died: 1994
- Known for: Public service, eugenics
- Spouse: Ina Bishop
- Children: 3

Wallace Hamilton Kuralt Sr. (1908–1994) was an influential North Carolina government bureaucrat who served as Director of Public Welfare in Mecklenburg County, North Carolina. from 1945 to 1972. in that role he implemented a variety of progressive programs and he also spearheaded the implementation of eugenics policies in that state.

== Background ==
Kuralt was born in 1908 in Springfield, Massachusetts. He graduated from the University of North Carolina at Chapel Hill in 1931 with a degree in business. He took a job as a typist with the Federal Emergency Relief Administration after finding it difficult to find a job. Then he moved to the Works Progress Administration in Fayetteville, North Carolina. He went back to UNC and studied social work and in 1945 took a job as the Director of Public Welfare in Mecklenburg County.

== Public welfare ==
Kuralt believed that government should take an active role in public welfare and his views were shaped by the policies of the New Deal. Kuralt worked actively to prevent poverty and established a whole range of social services from day care to piloting the implementation of legal aid for the poor to hiring the poor to help with education about his programs. He successfully lobbied for reform of North Carolina's abortion laws and pioneered the distribution of the pill and other birth control methods, including voluntary sterilization.

=== Administration of eugenics ===
While 31 states in the United States had eugenics sterilization programs during the 20th century, North Carolina's program was the most aggressive. Mecklenburg County sterilized many more people than any other county according to records of the North Carolina Eugenics Board. 403 Mecklenburg residents ordered sterilized by the N.C. Eugenics Board at the request of the county welfare department under Kuralt's leadership.

Kuralt retired in 1972 and died in 1994. To the end, he maintained his belief in the correctness of sterilisation and birth control as a means of eradicating poverty.

== Family ==
Wallace Hamilton Kuralt was married to Ina Bishop Kuralt. They were parents of three children, including journalist Charles Kuralt.
