= Women's Institute for Science, Equity and Race =

American non-profit organization

Women's Institute for Science, Equity, and Race
- WISER Logo
- Abbreviation: WISER
- Established: 2016
- Founder: Rhonda Vonshay Sharpe
- Type: Nonprofit organization
- Legal status: 501(c)(3)
- Purpose: Policy research
- Website: www.wiserpolicy.org

The Women's Institute for Science, Equity, and Race (WISER) is a non-profit, nonpartisan, 501(c)(3) research institute that centers Asian, Black, Hispanic, Native American and multiracial women in women-focused policy research. Women are often overlooked in research, but even research that accounts for gender discrimination often centers White women. When non-white women are addressed, they are grouped into one category as women of color. WISER counters this methodology, instead proposing a microanalysis approach and the disaggregation of data. This approach aims to improve equity for all women across a variety of social, economic, cultural, and political spheres.

== Founding ==
WISER was founded by Rhonda Vonshay Sharpe, an economist and past president of the National Economic Association, on March 8, 2016, which coincidentally was International Women's Day. Sharpe says of her decision, "I want to shine a light on populations that have been very much ignored." As an economist, she recognizes that even though white women have made strides in her field, Black women like herself and women of color are often overlooked. "When we talk about women," she says, "we mean White women."

== Approach ==
WISER aims to generate research that will influence policy to provide all women with equitable access to STEM education, health care and outcomes, employment, housing and legal representation, as well as equitable family structure and penal punishment. In pursuit of this goal, WISER advocates for the deconstruction of aggregate data concerning women in policy research. For example, Sharpe is quoted on the importance of addressing groups of people specifically, as opposed to grouping minorities under the term 'women of color'. By disaggregating 'women of color' into their specific groups, more accurate conclusions can be drawn, and more successful policy created. The disaggregation of data, the organization claims, reveals nuance that is otherwise obscured and helps to eliminate bias from the research process.

== Research ==
WISER is an organization built in 2016 wherein founder and president Rhonda V. Sharpe is currently the primary driver of research.

=== Education ===
WISER's work to disaggregate data has been useful for ranking United States colleges and universities based on how many Asian, Black, Hispanic, and Native American students earn degrees. For example, in 2019 WISER found that Michigan produces far fewer Asian, Black, Hispanic, Native American, and multiracial nursing students than the surrounding states. The same study also found Southern University at New Orleans to be a top producer of African-American graduates.

Sharpe also included in her presidential address for the National Economic Association that studying trends of educational milestones with an intersectional lens reveals stagnancy in the diversification of the economics field.

=== Health ===
Since founding WISER, Sharpe has also published a study that uses the disaggregation of data and finds that North Carolina's eugenic sterilization practices were unique to Black people. These findings, the study argues, suggest that North Carolina was attempting to breed out the Black population.
