= Jordan Grantz =

American Samoan footballer

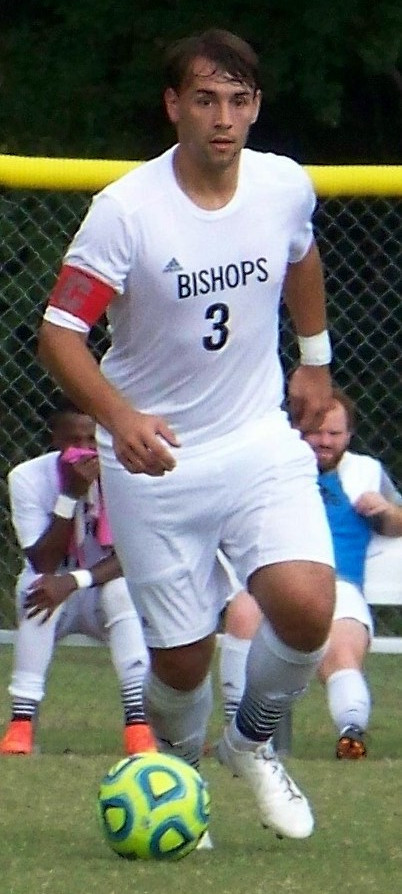
- Jordan Grantz - 2014

Personal information
- Date of birth: 5 December 1992 (age 33)
- Place of birth: Fredericksburg, Virginia, United States
- Height: 1.75 m (5 ft 9 in)
- Position: Midfielder

Youth career
- 2011: Richmond Kickers Academy

Senior career*
Years	Team	Apps	(Gls)
2011–2014	North Carolina Wesleyan College	59	(2)

International career
2015–	American Samoa	4	(0)
- * Club domestic league appearances and goals

Jordan Grantz (born 5 December 1992) is an American Samoan international footballer who played college soccer in the United States for North Carolina Wesleyan College as a midfielder.
