= Charles Kuralt =

American journalist (1934–1997)

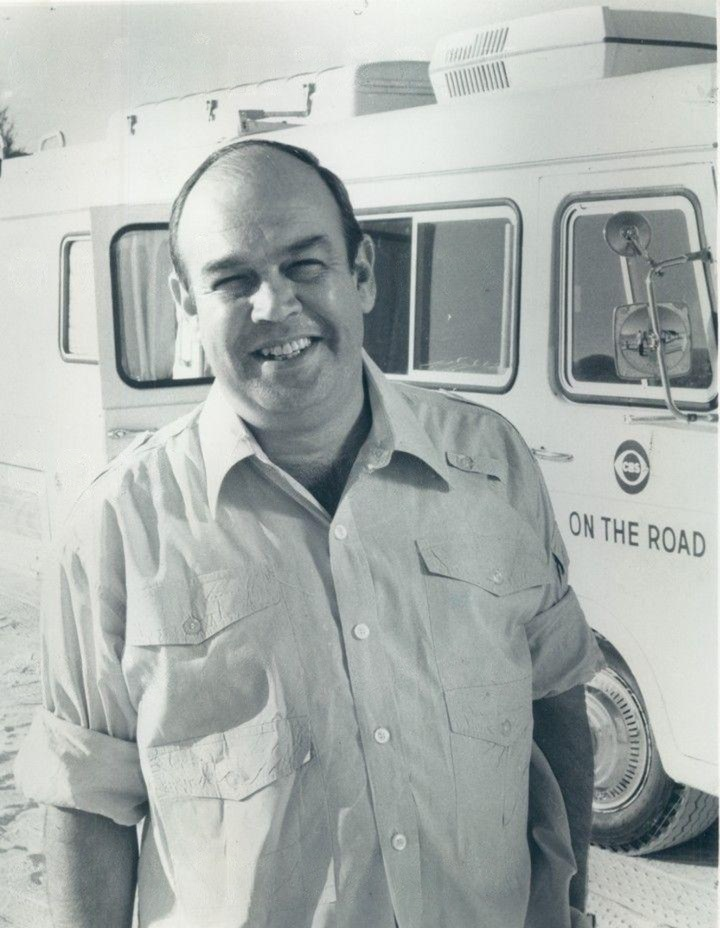
- Kuralt in 1976
- Born: Charles Bishop Kuralt; September 10, 1934; Wilmington, North Carolina, U.S.
- Died: July 4, 1997 (aged 62); New York City, U.S.
- Resting place: Old Chapel Hill Cemetery
- Education: University of North Carolina at Chapel Hill
- Occupations: journalist, correspondent, news anchor
- Years active: 1955–1997
- Employer: CBS News (1957–1994)
- Known for: "On the Road"
- Spouses: Jean Sory Guthery (m. 1954; div. 1960) Suzanne "Petie" Baird (m. 1962)
- Partner: Patricia Shannon (1968–1997)
- Children: 2
- Awards: Emmy Award; Audie Award; Peabody Award; Grammy Award, Spoken Book; George Polk Award; Golden Plate Award; Paul White Award; Ernie Pyle Award; Television Hall of Fame; Walter Cronkite Award for Excellence in Journalism; Alfred I. duPont–Columbia University Award

Charles Bishop Kuralt (September 10, 1934 – July 4, 1997) was an American television, newspaper and radio journalist and author. He is most widely known for his long career with CBS, first for his "On the Road" segments on The CBS Evening News with Walter Cronkite, and later as the first anchor of CBS News Sunday Morning, a position he held for fifteen years. In 1996, Kuralt was inducted into Television Hall of Fame of the National Academy of Television Arts & Sciences.

Kuralt's On the Road segments were recognized twice with personal Peabody Awards. The first, awarded in 1968, cited those segments as heartwarming and "nostalgic vignettes." In 1975, his award was for his work as a U.S. "bicentennial historian"; his work "capture[d] the individuality of the people, the dynamic growth inherent in the area, and...the rich heritage of this great nation." Kuralt also won an Emmy Award for On the Road in 1978. He shared in a third Peabody awarded to CBS News Sunday Morning in 1979.

== Early life ==
Kuralt was born in Wilmington, North Carolina. His father, Wallace H. Kuralt Sr. was a social worker and his mother, Ina Bishop, was a teacher. In 1945, the family moved to Charlotte, North Carolina, where his father became Director of Public Welfare in Mecklenburg County. Their house off Sharon Road, then 10 miles south of the city, was the only structure in the area.

As a boy, he won a children's sports writing contest for a local newspaper by writing about a dog that got loose on the field during a baseball game. When he was 14 years old, Kuralt became one of the youngest radio announcers in the country, covering minor-league baseball games and hosting a music show. In 1948, he was named one of four National Voice of Democracy winners at age 14, where he won a $500 scholarship. Later, at Charlotte's Central High School, Kuralt was voted "Most Likely to Succeed" in his graduating class of 1951.

He attended the University of North Carolina at Chapel Hill. There, he joined the literary fraternity St. Anthony Hall. He also became editor of The Daily Tar Heel and worked for WUNC radio. He also had a starring role in a radio program called American Adventure: A Study of Man in The New World in the episode titled "Hearth Fire", which aired on August 4, 1955. It is a telling of the advent of TVA's building lakes written by John Ehle and directed by John Clayton. During the summer, he also worked at WBTV in Charlotte. He graduated from UNC in 1955 with a degree in history.

== Career ==
After graduating from UNC, Kuralt worked as a reporter for the Charlotte News. He wrote "Charles Kuralt's People," a column that won an Ernie Pyle Award in 1956. He moved to CBS in 1957 as a writer. When he was 25 years old, he became the youngest correspondent in the history of CBS News. He became the first host of the primetime series Eyewitness to History in 1960. He also covered the 1960 presidential election. Variety said, "Kuralt's a comer. Young, good looking, full of poise and command, deep voiced and yet relaxed and not over-dramatic, he imparts a sense of authority and reliability to his task."

In 1961, he became CBS's Chief Latin American Correspondent, covering 23 countries from a base in Rio de Janeiro, Brazil. In 1963, he became the Chief West Coast Correspondent, moving to Los Angeles. The next year, he returned to New York City and the CBS News headquarters. Starting in 1961, he did four tours in Vietnam during the war. Kuralt said, ""Every time I got sent to Vietnam I seemed to get into some terrible situation without really trying too hard. In 1961, we got the first combat footage of that stage of the war. It was before the U.S. was involved with troops in the field, but we went out with the Vietnamese Rangers and got ambushed. Half the company we were with got killed. We were lucky as hell not to get killed."

He also covered the revolution in the Congo (now Democratic Republic of the Congo). In 1967, Kuralt and a CBS camera crew spent eight weeks with Ralph Plaisted in his first attempt to reach the North Pole by snowmobile, which resulted in the documentary To the Top of the World and his book of the same name.

Kuralt was said to have tired of what he considered the excessive rivalry between reporters on the hard news beats. He said, "I didn't like the competitiveness or the deadline pressure," he told the Academy of Television Arts & Sciences, upon his induction into their Hall of Fame. "I was sure that Dick Valeriani of NBC was sneaking around behind my back—and of course, he was!—getting stories that would make me look bad the next day. Even though I covered news for a long time, I was always hoping I could get back to something like my little column on the Charlotte News."

=== "On the Road" ===
Tired of covering war stories, Kuralt proposed to his bosses a new project: "How about no assignments at all? How about three months of rolling down the Great American Highway, just to see what he could see?" He finally persuaded CBS to let him try out the idea for three months with a three-person crew. It turned into a quarter-century project, with Kuralt logging more than a million miles. "On the Road" became a regular feature on The CBS Evening News with Walter Cronkite in 1967 and ran through 1980.

Kuralt hit the road in a motor home (he wore out six before he was through) with a small crew and avoided the interstates in favor of the nation's back roads in search of America's people and their doings. He said, "Interstate highways allow you to drive coast to coast, without seeing anything".

According to Thomas Steinbeck, the older son of John Steinbeck, the inspiration for "On the Road" was Steinbeck's Travels with Charley (whose title was initially considered as the name of Kuralt's feature). During his career, he won three Peabody Awards and ten Emmy Awards for journalism. He also won a George Polk Awards in 1980 for National Television Reporting.

In 2011, Kuralt's format was revived by CBS News, with Steve Hartman taking Kuralt's space. As of 2023, Hartman continues to host the segment weekly on the CBS Evening News.

=== CBS Sunday Morning anchor and subsequent CBS roles ===
On January 28, 1979, CBS launched CBS News Sunday Morning with Kuralt as host. On October 27, 1980, he was added as host of the weekday broadcasts of CBS' Morning show as well, joined with Diane Sawyer as weekday co-host on September 28, 1981. Kuralt left the weekday broadcasts in March 1982, but continued to anchor Sunday Morning. In 1989, he covered the democracy movement in China. From 1990 to 1991, he was an anchor on America Tonight. On April 3, 1994, he retired after 15 years as a host of Sunday Morning, and was replaced by Charles Osgood.

=== After CBS ===
At age 60, Kuralt surprised many by retiring from CBS News. At the time, he was the longest tenured on-air personality in the News Division. However, he hinted that his retirement might not be complete. In 1995, he narrated the TLC documentary The Revolutionary War. In 1996, he presented a short-lived show on the Disney Channel called This I Believe. In early 1997, he signed on to host a syndicated, thrice-weekly, ninety-second broadcast, An American Moment, presenting what CNN called "slices of Americana". He agreed to host a CBS cable broadcast show, I Remember, designed as a weekly, hour-long review of significant news from the three previous decades.

== Personal life ==
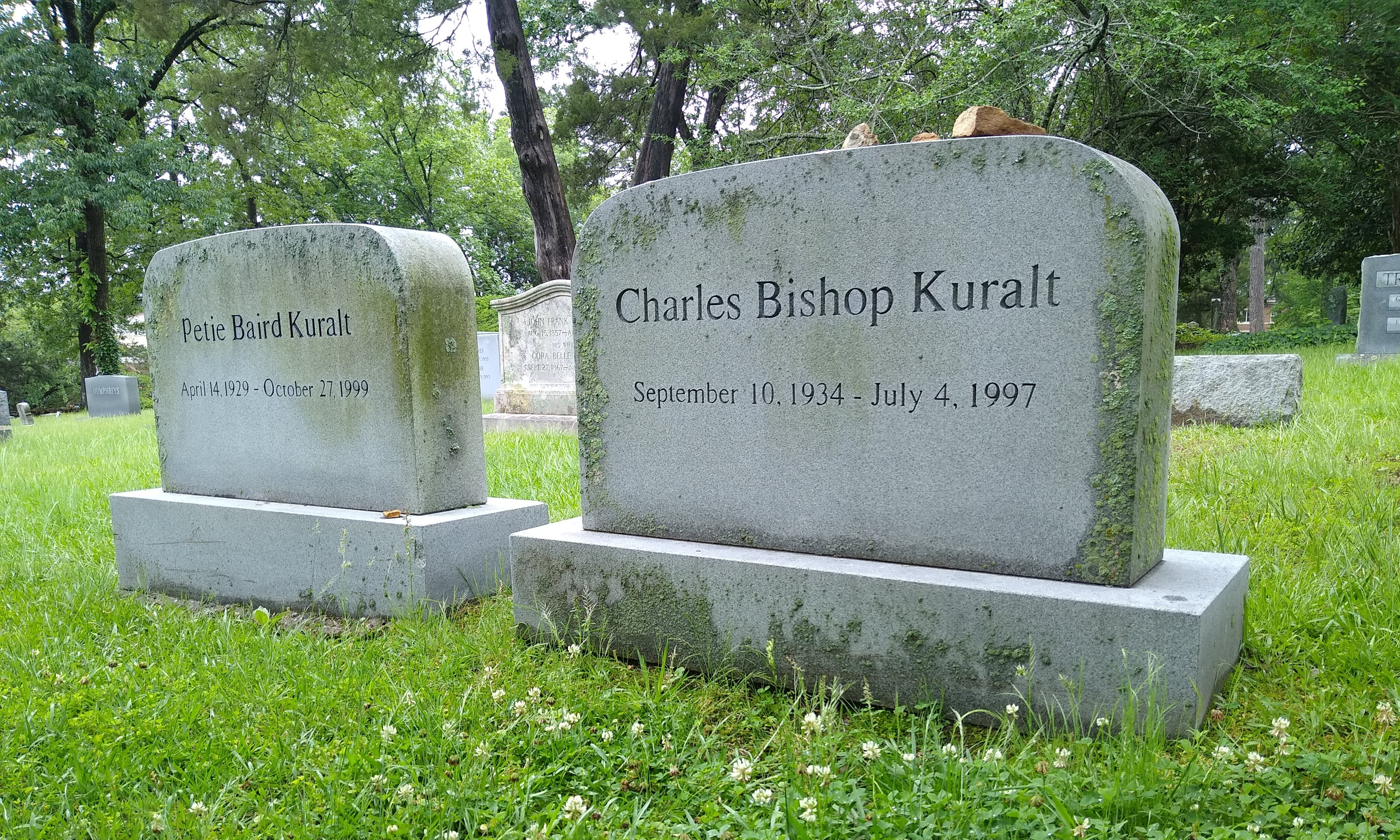
Gravestones for Kuralt and his wife Suzanne at the Old Chapel Hill Cemetery

On August 25, 1954, Kuralt married Jean Sory Guthery of Charlotte, North Carolina. At the time, both Kuralt and Sory were seniors at UNC. They had two daughters, Susan Bowers and Lisa Bowers White. The marriage ended in divorce in 1960. He married Suzanne Baird in 1962. They lived in New York City.

Kuralt refused to alter his habits in favor of healthier ones; he ate unhealthy food, drank and smoked. He was once pulled over for driving under the influence. Late in his life, Kuralt became ill with systemic lupus erythematosus ("lupus"). Kuralt died from heart failure on July 4, 1997, at New York–Presbyterian Hospital, aged 62. Kuralt is buried on the UNC grounds in Old Chapel Hill Cemetery. His wife Suzanne died in 1999 and is buried next to him.

After Kuralt's death, questions about his estate led to the public disclosure of his three-decade companionship with a Montana woman named Patricia Shannon (formerly Patricia Shannon Baker). Kuralt met Shannon while doing a story on Pat Baker Park in Reno, Nevada, which Shannon had promoted and volunteered to build in 1968. The park was in a low-income area of Reno that had no parks until Shannon promoted her plan. Kuralt mentioned Shannon and the building of the park — but not the nature of their relationship — in a book he published in 1990 chronicling his early life and journalistic career. With Shannon, Kuralt had a second, "shadow" family; he paid for Shannon to attend the Inchbald School of Design, and helped to raise and financially support her three children. Kuralt's wife was apparently unaware of this. After Kuralt's death, Shannon asserted that he had willed her a property in Twin Bridges, Montana; though it was contested by Kuralt's family, her claim was upheld by the Montana Supreme Court.

== Publications ==
=== Audiobooks ===
- More Charles Kuralt's American Moments (1999) ISBN 9780743519984
- Charles Kuralt's Autumn. (1997) ISBN 9780671574376
- Charles Kuralt's Summer (1997) ISBN 9780743542685
- Charles Kuralt's Spring (1997) ISBN 9780743542678
- Charles Kuralt's Christmas (1996) ISBN 9780743542661
- Charles Kuralt's America (1995) ISBN 9780385485104

=== Books ===
- Charles Kuralt's People (2002) ISBN 978-0967909615
- Charles Kuralt's America (1995) ISBN 9780385485104
- Dr. Frank: Life with Frank Porter Graham. with John Ehle (1993) ISBN 9780963891501
- A Life on the Road (1990) ISBN 9780345484840
- Southerners: Portrait of People (1986) ISBN 9785551629986
- North Carolina Is My Home (1986) ISBN 9780887421075
- On the Road with Charles Kuralt (1985) ISBN 9780449007402
- Dateline America (1979) ISBN 9780151239573

=== Narrator ===
- The Winnie-the-Pooh Read Aloud Collection: Volume 1 (1998) ISBN 9780525461111
- Our Lady of the Freedoms (1998) ISBN 9780743541640
- Pooh's Audio Library: Winnie-the-Pooh, The House at Pooh Corner; When We Were Very Young; Now We Are Six (1997) ISBN 9780140868128
- Christmas in Appalachia (1964) Christmas in Appalachia (1964) "The Permanently Poor" | 16mm Film Scan

== Awards ==
- 1998: Grammy Award for Best Spoken Word Album for Children for Winnie the Pooh
- 1997: Citizen's Award, U.S. Fish and Wildlife Service (award posthumously)
- 1997: Grammy Award for Best Spoken Word Album for Charles Kuralt's Spring
- 1996: Audie Award for Nonfiction for Charles Kuralt's America
- 1996: Walter Cronkite Award for Excellence in Journalism
- 1996: Television Hall of Fame, Academy of Television Arts & Sciences
- 1995: Columbia Journalism Award from the Columbia University Graduate School of Journalism
- 1995: Alfred I. duPont–Columbia University Award, Silver Baton for reporting on CBS News Sunday Morning
- 1994: TCA Career Achievement Award, Television Critics Association
- 1994: Paul White Award, Radio Television Digital News Association
- 1993: Golden Plate Award of the American Academy of Achievement
- 1985: Broadcaster of the Year, International Radio & Television Society
- 1982: Alfred I. duPont–Columbia University Award, Silver Baton for CBS News Sunday Morning
- 1980: George Polk Award for national television reporting
- 1979: George Foster Peabody Award (shared) for CBS News Sunday Morning
- 1978: Emmy Award for Outstanding Achievement in Broadcast Journalism for On the Road
- 1975: George Foster Peabody Award (individual) for his work on On the Road to '76
- 1973: Alfred I. duPont–Columbia University Award (shared) for "CBS Reports: ...But What If the Dream Comes True?"
- 1968: George Foster Peabody Award (individual) for On the Road
- 1956, Ernie Pyle Award from Scripps-Howard for newspaper writing

== Honors ==
- Kuralt received the National Humanities Medal from President Bill Clinton in 1995.
- The Charles Kuralt Trail along the Roanoke–Tar–Neuse–Cape Fear Ecosystem in Virginia and North Carolina honors his many On the Road and Sunday Morning stories about nature and wildlife.
- In 2014, the University of North Carolina at Chapel Hill used Kuralt's speech from its 1993 Bicentennial Celebration in a television commercial
- The University of North Carolina's Journalism School displays many of Kuralt's awards and a re-creation of his New York City office
- Kuralt's papers are archived at Southern Historical Collection at the University of North Carolina at Chapel Hill.

Media offices
Preceded by First	CBS News Sunday Morning anchor January 28, 1979 – April 3, 1994	Succeeded by Charles Osgood
