= Old Chapel Hill Cemetery =

Historic cemetery in North Carolina, United States

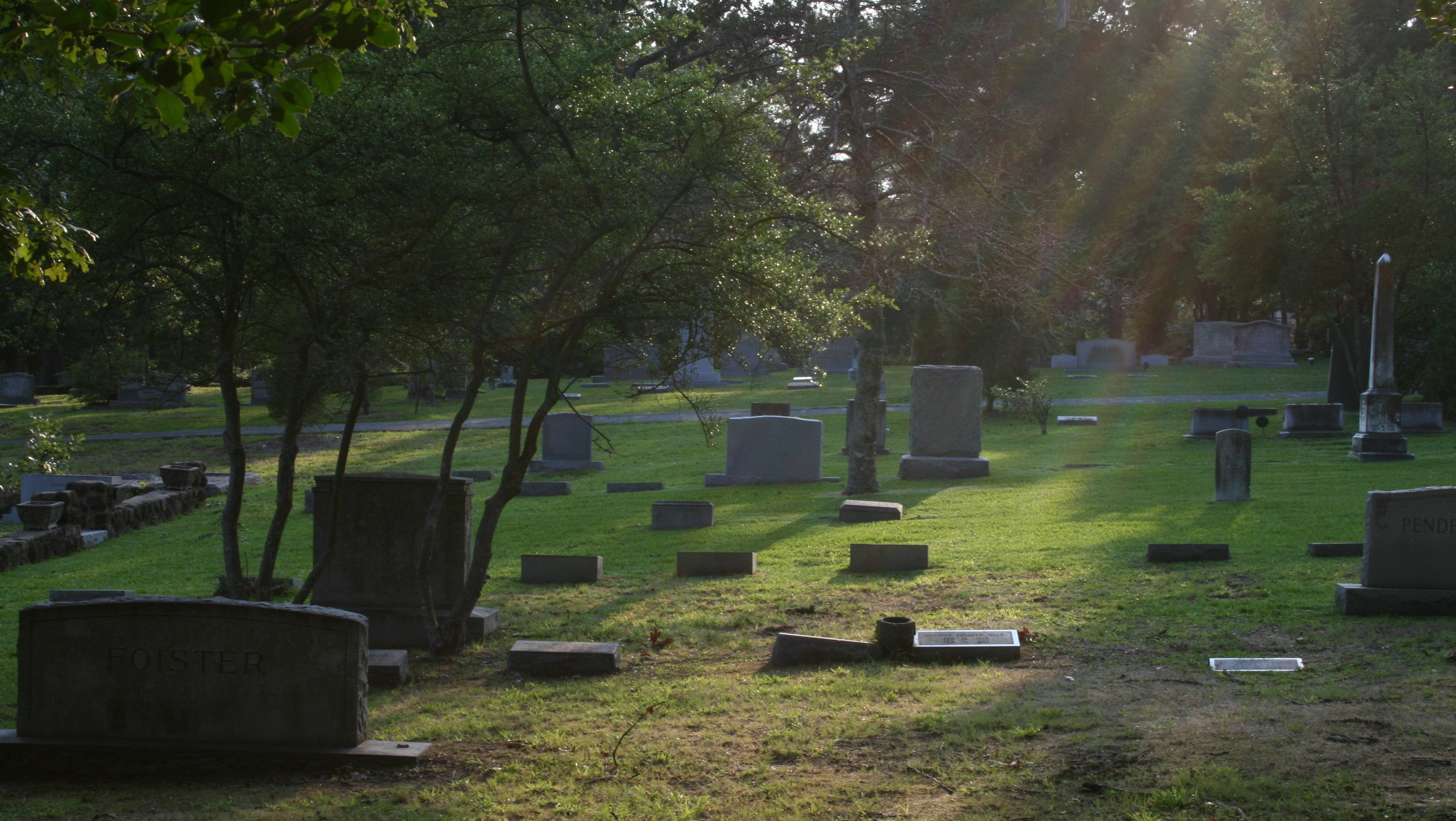
- Sun rays at dusk
- Interactive map of Old Chapel Hill Cemetery

Details
- Established: 1798
- Location: Jct. of NC 54 and County Club Rd., NW corner, Chapel Hill, North Carolina
- Country: United States
- Coordinates: 35°54′39.36″N 79°2′38.91″W
- Type: Public
- Owned by: Town of Chapel Hill
- Size: 6.98 acres (0.01 sq mi; 2.82 ha)
- No. of graves: ~ 1600
- Website: Link
- The Political Graveyard: Old Chapel Hill Cemetery
- Old Chapel Hill Cemetery
- U.S. National Register of Historic Places
- U.S. Historic district
- NRHP reference No.: 94000570
- Added to NRHP: June 3, 1994

Old Chapel Hill Cemetery is a graveyard and national historic district located on the campus of the University of North Carolina at Chapel Hill in Chapel Hill, North Carolina, United States.

== History ==
The land was a land grant to the University of North Carolina by the State of North Carolina. The land encompassed 125 acres (51 ha), and was sold for five shillings on October 21, 1776. The cemetery currently covers 6.98 acres (2.82 ha). The first recorded burial was George Clarke, a Burke County student at the university, who died September 28, 1798. His headstone was not placed until several years later. By January 28, 1994, 1,621 burials had been performed. The cemetery is now almost full, and all of the plots have already been bought. In 1922, the town took over responsibility for maintaining the cemetery, and in 1988, the ownership changed over to the University.

A low rock wall was built around the cemetery in 1835 at the cost of $64.41. The school officially named the cemetery "College Graveyard," as opposed to "Village Cemetery," like the Chapel Hill residents called it. Five sidewalks divide the cemetery into six sections. Two of the sections were reserved for African-American burials because there were no black church cemeteries in town. A low rock wall divides the two segregated sections (Sections A and B) from the rest.

While burials in the white section have headstones with inscriptions, burials in the African-American section were marked by stones, leaving many of the graves unnamed. Notably, most of the individuals buried in the Black section of the cemetery were either slaves or laborers at the University. These portions of the cemetery remained largely unpreserved into the 20th century, with the land being used for parking at a UNC football game in 1985. In 2010 and 2012, archeological surveying took place to identify over 200 unmarked graves, primarily in the African American sections of the cemetery. In 2016, a headstone was placed as a memorial of these unmarked graves and the Black community members buried there.

The Dialectic and Philanthropic Societies were the first to establish plots. In the other sections, there are administrators and professors, as well as prominent public officials, business leaders, and artists from the area. During the Civil War, Confederate soldiers were buried there.

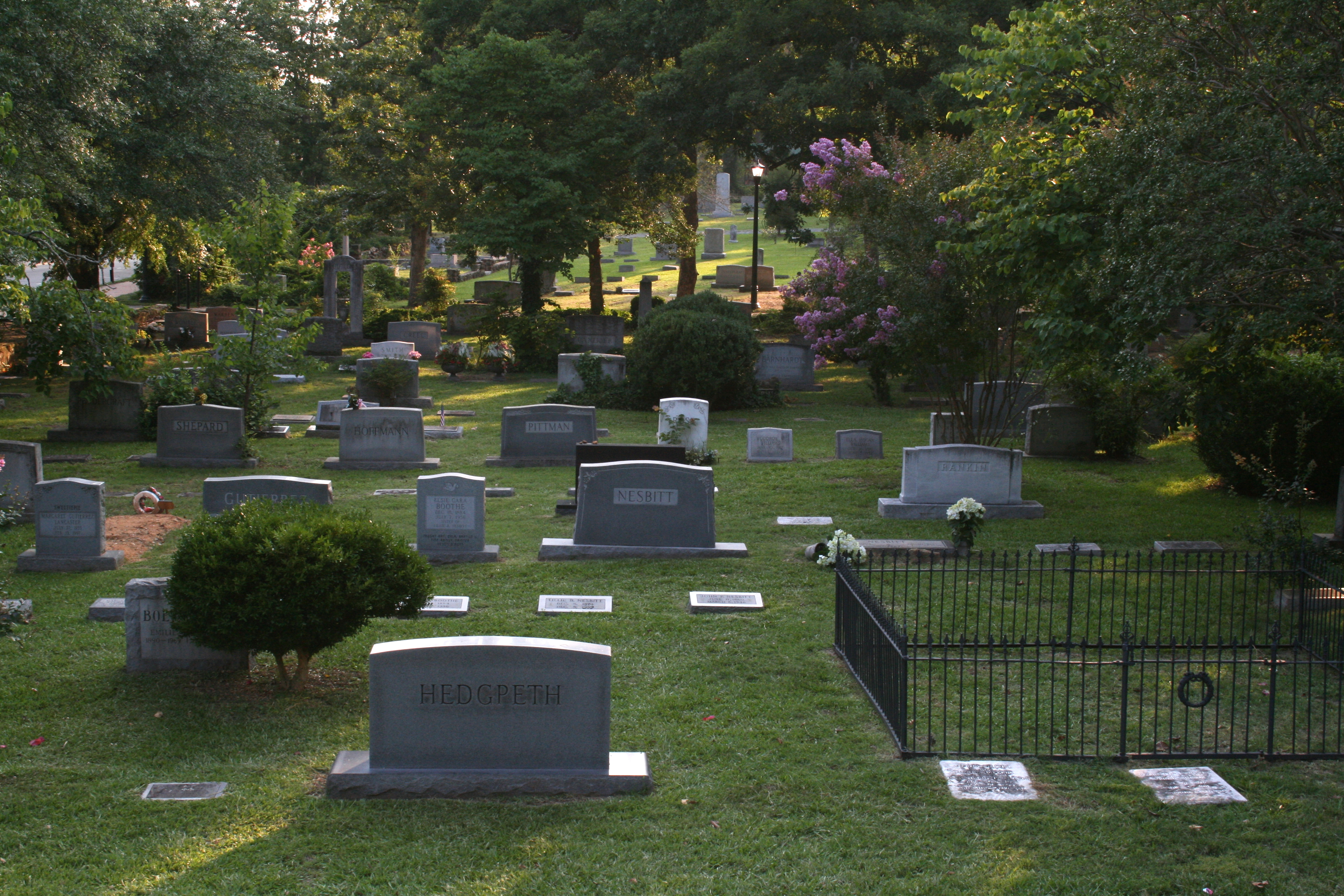
Headstones, flat plaques, gated plots and other accommodations

There are many different styles of grave markers represented in the cemetery. Many of the early family plots are marked by monuments and obelisks with smaller tablets marking individual graves. There are also uninscribed fieldstones, headstones, ledgers, boxtombs, and tomb-tables in the newer sections. Marble and granite were used most frequently, but stone and concrete can also be found.

The Old Chapel Hill Cemetery remains an integral part of campus life. Students can be found relaxing or studying in the cemetery grounds. Diverse species of trees, such as oaks, hickories, gums, cedars, maples, and pines, create a cover of shade in the cemetery. There are also shrubs, like boxwoods, azaleas, nandinas, and crape myrtles, around many of the plots. During the spring, dogwood trees, azaleas and wisteria make the cemetery one of the most beautiful spots on campus. Some of the individual gravestones are covered by English ivy and vinca. A gazebo has been built between Section B and Section 1 and provides a convenient place to sit.

Vandalism has been a major problem in the cemetery. Whether the culprits are just careless or actually meaning to cause damage, the cemetery has had many tombstones ruined throughout the years. Five 19th-century headstones were tipped over and smashed the day before Charles Kuralt was buried in the cemetery. On November 27, 1974, 40 to 50 monuments were broken and pushed off their bases. In 1985, football fans eager to get to a seat damaged stones.

Distinguished persons buried in the cemetery include legendary North Carolina basketball coach Dean Smith; band leader Kay Kyser and his wife, singer Georgia Carroll; playwright Paul Green; novelists Alice Adams and Max Steele; university presidents Frank Porter Graham, Robert Burton House, and William Friday; and CBS newsman Charles Kuralt.

In 2005, the Memorial Grove portion was established to allow space for the spreading of ashes of cremated persons. Names of those whose ashes have been spread in the grove are inscribed upon the Wall of Remembrance. To date, the names of fifteen persons are inscribed on the wall. Some of these persons had been cremated before the opening of the grove. It is assumed that their ashes were originally retained in the care of loved ones.
