= Julian Elliott =

British academic and educational psychologist

Joe Elliott FAcSS

Principal of Collingwood College, Durham
- In office 2011–2025
- Preceded by: Ed Corrigan
- Succeeded by: Thom Brooks

Personal details
- Born: Julian George Charles Elliott; 27 July 1955 (age 71)
- Known for: Dyslexia debate

Academic background
- Education: Wimbledon College
- Alma mater: Durham University

Academic work
- Discipline: Educational psychology
- Sub-discipline: Dyslexia; special education
- Institutions: University of Sunderland; University of Durham

Julian George Charles "Joe" Elliott, FAcSS (born 27 July 1955) is a British academic and educational psychologist. He has been Professor of Education at Durham University since 2004, and principal of Collingwood College, Durham from 2011 to 2025. He has caused controversy by describing dyslexia as a 'useless term' and a 'meaningless label'.

== Early life and education ==
Elliott was born on 27 July 1955 in Epsom, Surrey, England. He was educated at Wimbledon College, an all-boys voluntary aided Catholic school. He studied at Durham University.

== Career ==
Elliot qualified as a teacher and taught in mainstream and special schools. He then practised as an LEA educational psychologist.

In 1990, he became an academic, and joined the University of Sunderland as a lecturer. He was promoted to professor in 1998 with the award of a personal chair within the School of Education. He rose to be Acting Dean of the university's School of Education and Lifelong Learning. In 2004, he joined Durham University as Professor of Education and the Principal of Collingwood College.

In addition to his university work, he sits on a number of editorial boards. He is the Associate Editor of the British Journal of Educational Psychology and he is a member of the board for the British Educational Research Journal, Learning and Individual Differences, and Comparative Education.

=== Dyslexia debate ===
One of Elliott's first papers that challenged the conceptualisation of Dyslexia, co-authored with Dr Simon Gibbs, was published in the Journal of Philosophy of Education. This sparked controversy and has been widely cited. Elliott co-authored a book with Elena L. Grigorenko titled The Dyslexia Debate which was published in early 2014. The book, and his previous work, has argued that there is no difference between poor readers and dyslexic people; dyslexia is a 'useless term' and a 'meaningless label' that should be discontinued. It also suggested that the diagnosis was being misused by middle-class parents to get additional support for their children, and that state schools are much less inclined to make a diagnosis because the pressures it would put on their limited budgets. He supports better funding of literacy education would help to overcome this unbalanced system as the same techniques help both poor readers and dyslexic people, rather than a continuation of the present system.

His research has been controversial. His publications were used by Graham Stringer, a British Member of Parliament, to support his view that dyslexia was 'a cruel fiction'. He suggested that funding should be redirected from targeted support to better teaching of literacy; 'A whole industry has sprung up around creating a medical condition when what is needed is better methods to teach children to read.'.

Professor John Stein of the University of Oxford has disagreed with his conclusion saying that there dyslexia is separate to reading difficulties caused by low intelligence because dyslexia has genetic, immunological and nutritional causes. A joint statement from Sir Jim Rose, a former director of OFSTED, and Dr John Rack, a director of Dyslexia Action, spoke against Elliot's conclusion and supported the current definition of dyslexia.

== Honours ==
In 2010, Elliott was elected a Fellow of the Academy of Social Sciences (FAcSS).

== Selected works ==
- Alloway, Tracy Packiam; Gathercole, Susan Elizabeth; Kirkwood, Hannah; Elliott, Julian (1 March 2009). "The Cognitive and Behavioral Characteristics of Children With Low Working Memory". Child Development. 80 (2): 606–621. doi:10.1111/j.1467-8624.2009.01282.x.
- Elliott, Julian; Grigorenko, Elena L. (2014). The dyslexia debate. New York, NY: Cambridge University Press. ISBN 978-0521119863.

Academic offices
Preceded by Ed Corrigan	Principal of Collingwood College, Durham; 2011 to 2025	Succeeded by Thom Brooks
