= Vianne (novel) =

2025 novel by Joanne Harris

- Author: Joanne Harris
- Language: English
- Genre: Novel
- Publisher: Orion Books
- Publication date: 22 May 2025
- Publication place: United Kingdom
- Media type: Print (hardback and paperback)
- Pages: 416 (first edition, hardback)
- ISBN: 978-1398710870 (first edition, hardback)
- Followed by: Chocolat

Vianne is a 2025 novel by British author Joanne Harris. It is a prequel to her 1999 novel Chocolat, and is the fifth novel in the Chocolat series. It also exists as an audiobook, narrated by the author.

The novel is set six years before Chocolat, and finds the heroine, Vianne Rocher, aged twenty-one, newly bereaved, and homeless in the French city of Marseille. Still grieving the death of her mother, but determined to give her unborn child a better life than the one she has had, Vianne finds employment in a bistrot in the Old Quarter of Marseille, and learns how to use the cookery book left to the owner, Louis Martin, by his dead wife, Margot. She also befriends Guy Lacarrière, who is trying to open a boutique chocolaterie in the Old Quarter, in the face of all obstacles. Guy's passion for chocolate intrigues Vianne, who ends up helping him in his shop and learning the various techniques of chocolate-making. But the more closely involved Vianne becomes in the life of the community, the more she sees that her dream of putting down roots in Marseille is fraught with difficulty. Her mother's legacy - the magic that both of them practised - is a gift that comes at a price, and Vianne is forced to confront both her past and her identity.

== Setting ==
=== Marseille ===
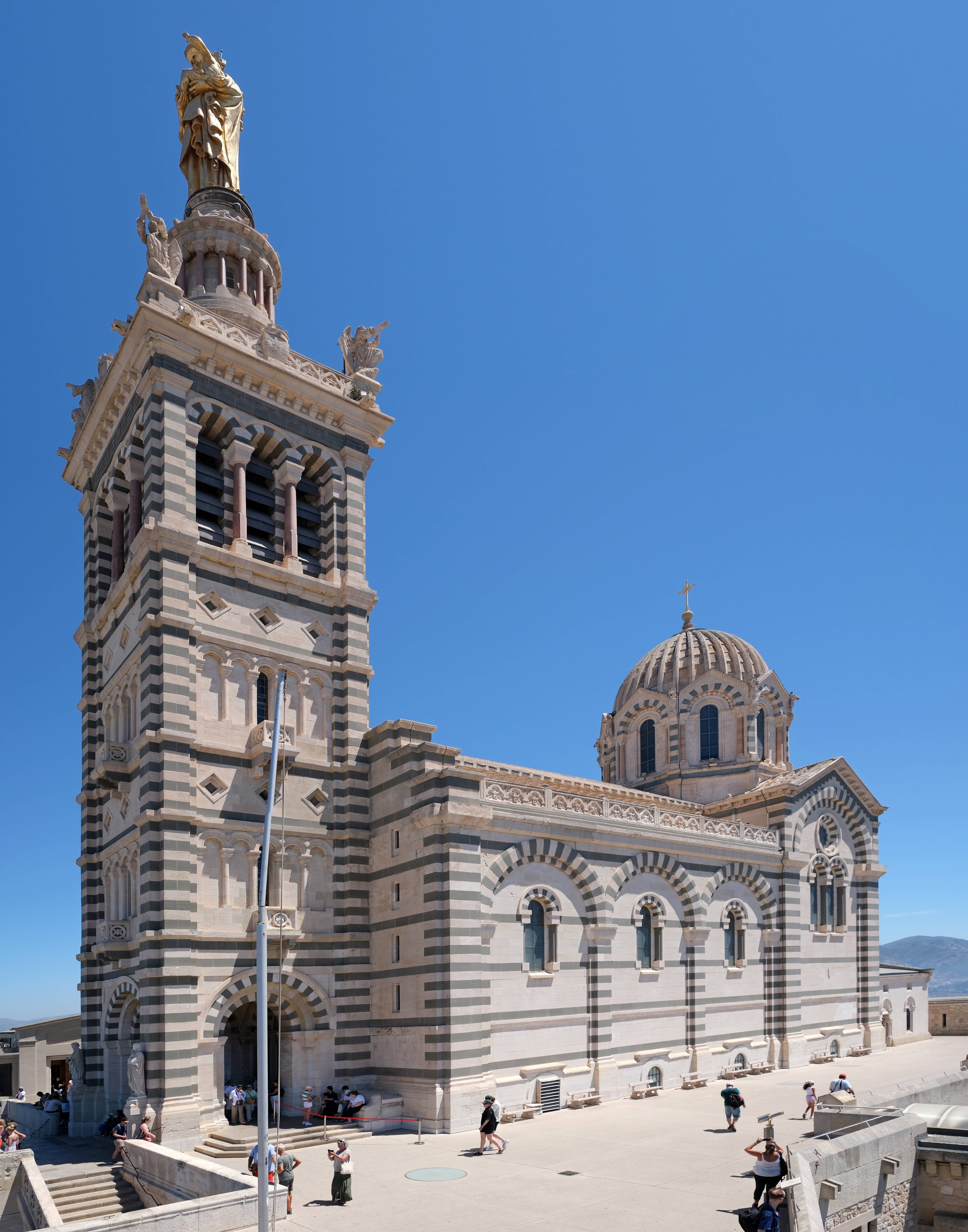
The basilica of Notre-Dame de la Garde in Marseille

Harris states that she chose Marseille as the main setting for Vianne because of its duality, its human diversity and its strong culinary traditions. She also states that the basilica of Notre-Dame de la Garde, with its golden statue of the Virgin and Child, was a starting-point for the novel due to the importance of motherhood as a theme in the book.

=== Vianne ===
The village of Vianne in Nouvelle-Aquitaine also plays a role in the novel. From its name Vianne takes her new identity, and she sees it as a future safe haven for herself and her unborn child.

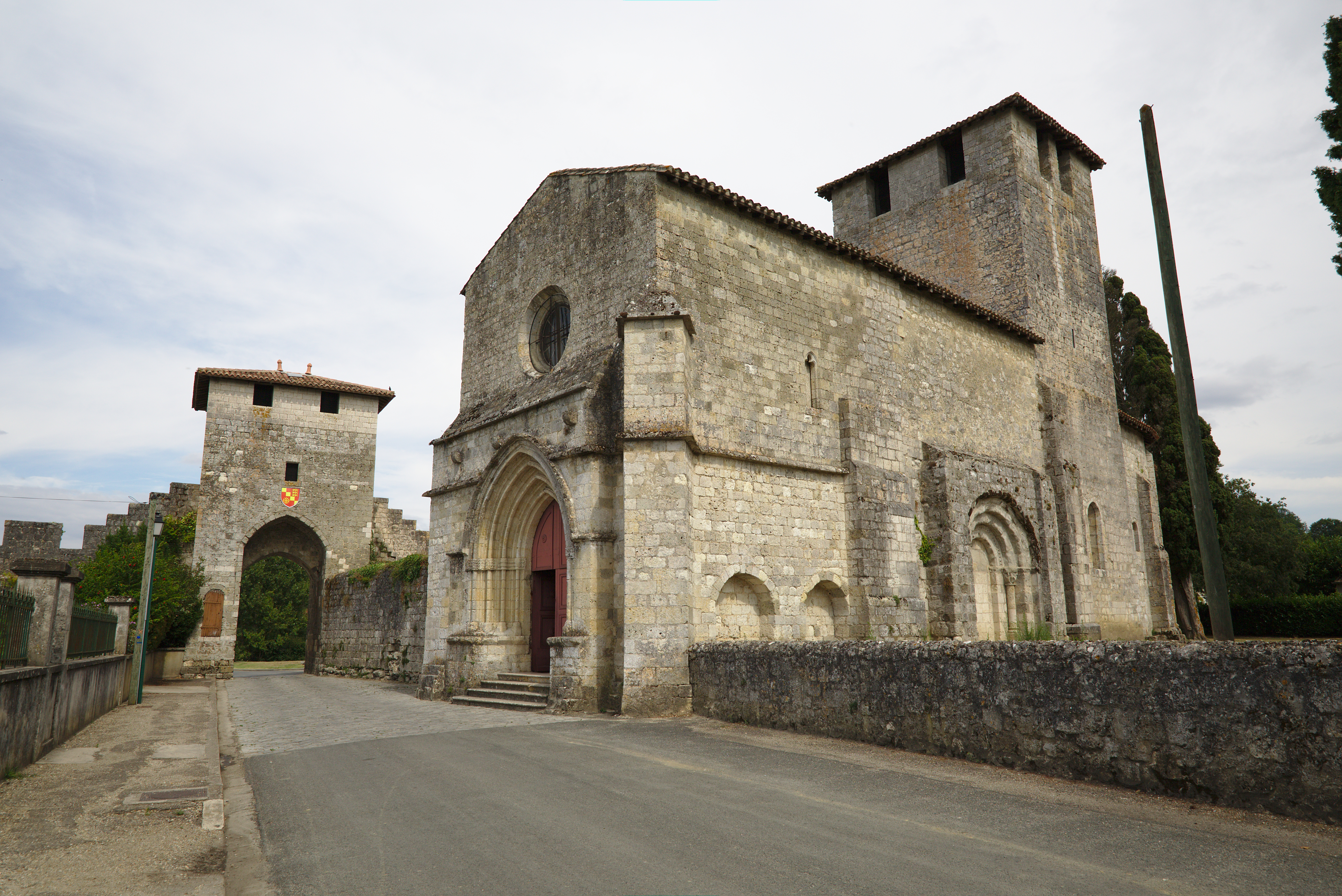
Church in Vianne

== Plot ==
Vianne opens in 1993 in the French coastal city of Marseille. Vianne - currently going by the name Sylviane Rochas - has moved from New York after the death of her mother, and for the first time in her life, is travelling alone. Still grieving, pregnant, homeless and without direction, she opens her map book at random, sees the name of a village - Vianne - and takes the name for herself.

Determined to build a more stable life for herself and her unborn child, Vianne rents a room in a small bistrot, and the owner, Louis Martin, offers her a job in his kitchen, where she learns to cook from his late wife Margot’s recipes. Vianne, who has no prior experience in cooking, learns to appreciate this "domestic magic", so different to the magic her mother has taught her. She learns that Louis is still grieving Margot, who died twenty years previously in childbirth after a number of miscarriages. Louis’ customers, all locals, all warm to Vianne, except Emile, Louis' closest friend, who resents her presence. Emile and Louis are both keeping a secret, and both men are grieving for Margot in their own way.

Vianne meets Guy Lacarrière and his partner Mahmed, who are planning to open a chocolate shop. She is drawn to the magic and history of chocolate, and begins to use chocolate spices in her cooking in the bistrot, and to combine its magic with her own. She also meets Khamaseen, a mysterious Arab woman who warns her that putting down roots comes at a price.

As Louis becomes dependent on Vianne, his affection turns to possessiveness. Vianne, who has been taught by her mother to value her independence above all things, flees Marseille and ends up homeless in Toulouse, where she is helped by the kind-hearted Stéphane, who lives on the streets with his cat.

Guy finds Vianne and brings her back to Marseille, with Stéphane, and offers them both a place to stay. Guy and Mahmed are both worried about money, and Guy is keeping secrets from his partner. Vianne offers to help, but is anxious that the more visible she makes herself, the more likely it is that the past she and her mother were fleeing will be discovered. She discovers that although Margot died from complications in pregnancy, her child did not die, but was abandoned by Louis and later adopted. She locates the young man, who has learning difficulties. She tries to reunite him with Louis, but Louis is angry and rejects him. Meanwhile Guy and Mahmed are trying to open the chocolate shop in time for Christmas, in spite of numerous setbacks. Vianne sees a mysterious man in black lurking around the shop, and fears that he is looking for her. Her own mother was constantly on the lookout for a Man in Black, who she believed was in pursuit of them, possibly because Vianne's mother stole her as a child.

Eventually, Louis comes to accept his son and to forgive himself; Emile admits to Louis that he was in love with Margot, and is forgiven. The chocolate shop's opening is a success. Vianne decides to leave Marseille: Stéphane tries to go with her, but she leaves alone.

== Main Characters ==
- Vianne Rocher. The titular protagonist. Vianne has been on the run all her life from a character her mother called the Man in Black. A young woman of singular empathy and perception, Vianne has the ability to see what other people need, their grief and damage.
- Louis Martin. Proprietor of La Bonne Mère, a run-down bistrot in Marseille. A widower of twenty years, he is still mourning his wife, Margot, who died from complications in pregnancy.
- Khamaseen. Named after a North African wind, she appears throughout the novel as a reminder to Vianne that her travels are not over.
- Emile. Friend of Louis; bad-tempered and resentful
- Guy Lacarrière. The son of a wealthy family of lawyers, he has broken tradition by attempting a career in chocolate making.
- Mahmed. Guy's partner, ostracized by his family for being gay.
- Stéphane. Has been living on the streets for years following a family tragedy, but reinvents himself thanks to Guy and Mahmed.

== Themes ==
Themes include that of the outsider, immigration, motherhood, magic and community, as well as: "family, food, and the choice we make between putting down roots and daring to fly free." In a piece for Lithub, Harris states that she and Vianne have grown together over the years, and that the experience of motherhood has kept them connected. She writes:

Without this connection, I might not have tried to follow Vianne any further: but motherhood linked us most of all, and motherhood keeps us connected, in spite of the differences between us. Which is why, twenty-six years after the publication of Chocolat, I have come back to Vianne’s world, not with a sequel, but with an origin story. Vianne and I have both reached a stage at which we need to look back before moving forward.

Food also features prominently. In an interview with Elle, Harris speaks of food as transformative and an antidote to grief, as well as a means of connecting people with one other. In an interview with La Repubblica, Harris says: "Food is pleasure, but also a political weapon."Asked about changing attitudes to food in an interview with the Independent, she says: "Food has always had its political side and its darkness – and there has always been a general fear around the pleasure of food and the ‘sin’ of gluttony.”

== Scent ==
In 2025, Harris collaborated with the perfumer Sarah McCartney of 4160 Tuesdays to create Vianne's Confession, a scent designed to accompany a passage from the book.

== Reception ==
The novel was largely well-received, and debuted at number 9 in the Sunday Times bestseller chart. The Independent called it: "a multisensory symphony of tastes and smells so glorious you almost find yourself drooling." Buzz Magazine comments on the quirky characters, the "engaging" character voice and "the welcome dashes of darkness" which counteract the sweetness. People Magazine included it in the best books of September 2025, and Linda Hitchcock in BookTrib called it: "rightfully one of the most highly anticipated books of... summer." Joanne Kaufman wrote in Wall Street Journal: "Ms. Harris’s descriptive powers are wonderful whether conjuring Marseille or a pissaladière..." although Claire Allfree of The Telegraph called it "sickly-sweet."
