= Chiedu Eseadi =

Nigerian academic and educational psychologist

- Born: 5 April 1985 (age 41); Ukwu-Oba, Nigeria

Academic background
- Education: University of Nigeria, Nsukka

Chiedu Eseadi (born 5 April 1985) is a Nigerian-born South African academic and researcher in the Department of Educational Psychology at the University of Johannesburg, South Africa. His work focuses on career counselling, mental health, and career transitions, particularly for individuals with disabilities and neurodevelopmental disorders.

== Biography ==
Chiedu Eseadi was born in Ukwu-Oba, Nigeria. He earned a Bachelor of Education, a Master of Education, and a Doctor of Philosophy in Education from the University of Nigeria, Nsukka, where his doctoral research focused on career satisfaction, work-related beliefs and burnout.

Eseadi began his academic career at the University of Nigeria, Nsukka, teaching and conducting research in guidance and counselling. He later joined the University of Johannesburg, South Africa, where he lectures educational psychology modules and supervises postgraduate students.

Eseadi is a member of the International Society of Managing and Technical Editors, the Planetary Health Alliance, CAREER-LEAD and the Mixed Methods International Research Association. In 2024, he was listed among the AD Scientific Index Top 100 Education Scientists in Africa. He serves on the editorial boards of PLOS ONE, BMC Public Health and Medicine (Baltimore). He is the Technical Editor of the African Journal of Neurodiversity, and fellow of Salzburg Global as well as Savvy Global programs. He has held a Global Excellence & Stature (GES) Research Fellowship at the University of Johannesburg.

== Research ==
Chiedu Eseadi’s research operates at the intersection of educational psychology, career development, and evidence-based mental health interventions. His research often utilizes Rational Emotive Behavior Therapy (REBT) and Cognitive Behavioral Therapy (CBT) in various educational and health contexts. He co-authored a peer-reviewed study in Social Sciences & Humanities Open investigating the use of acceptance and commitment therapy (ACT) to reduce mathematics anxiety among students, finding that ACT significantly lowered anxiety compared to conventional counselling approaches. Earlier work evaluated the effectiveness of rational-emotive behaviour therapy in reducing adverse childhood stress in Nigeria, demonstrating significant improvements in cognitive and behavioural outcomes. Eseadi has also examined career transitioning and policy issues for students with visual impairments, addressing educational and support barriers. His work includes analyses of entrepreneurial intention among students with neurodevelopmental disorders, highlighting factors influencing career development. Eseadi holds a Y-rating from the South African National Research Foundation.

== Selected Publications ==
- Eseadi, C., Anyanwu, J. I., Ogbuabor, S. E., & Ikechukwu-Ilomuanya, A. B. (2015). Effects of cognitive restructuring intervention program of rational-emotive behavior therapy on adverse childhood stress in Nigeria. Journal of Rational-Emotive & Cognitive-Behavior Therapy.
- Eseadi, C., & Amedu, A. N. (2023). Potential impact of music interventions in managing diabetic conditions. World Journal of Clinical Cases, 11(13), 2916-2924.
- Eseadi, C., & Diale, B. M. (2023). Examining career transitioning among students with specific learning disabilities. International Journal of Special Education, 38(3), 82-94.
- Eseadi, C. (2023). Impacts and barriers associated with career transition among students with specific learning disabilities. Journal of Education and Teaching.
- Eseadi, C. (2023). The Impacts of Religious Rational-Emotive Behavior Therapy (RREBT) on Mental Health: A Comparative Review. Islamic Guidance and Counseling Journal, 6(2).
- Eseadi, C., & Amedu, A. N. (2024). Depression among breast cancer patients in Nigeria: A scoping review. Archives of Breast Cancer.
- Eseadi, C., et al. (2023). Significance of fostering the mental health of patients with diabetes through critical time intervention. World Journal of Clinical Cases.
