= Edward Corrigan =

Edward Corrigan may refer to:

- Ed Corrigan (Francis Edward Corrigan, born 1946), British mathematician and theoretical physicist
- Edward C. Corrigan (1843–1924), American horse racing executive
- E. Gerald Corrigan (born 1941), American banker
