= Collingwood College, Durham =

Constituent college of Durham University

Collingwood College
- Durham University
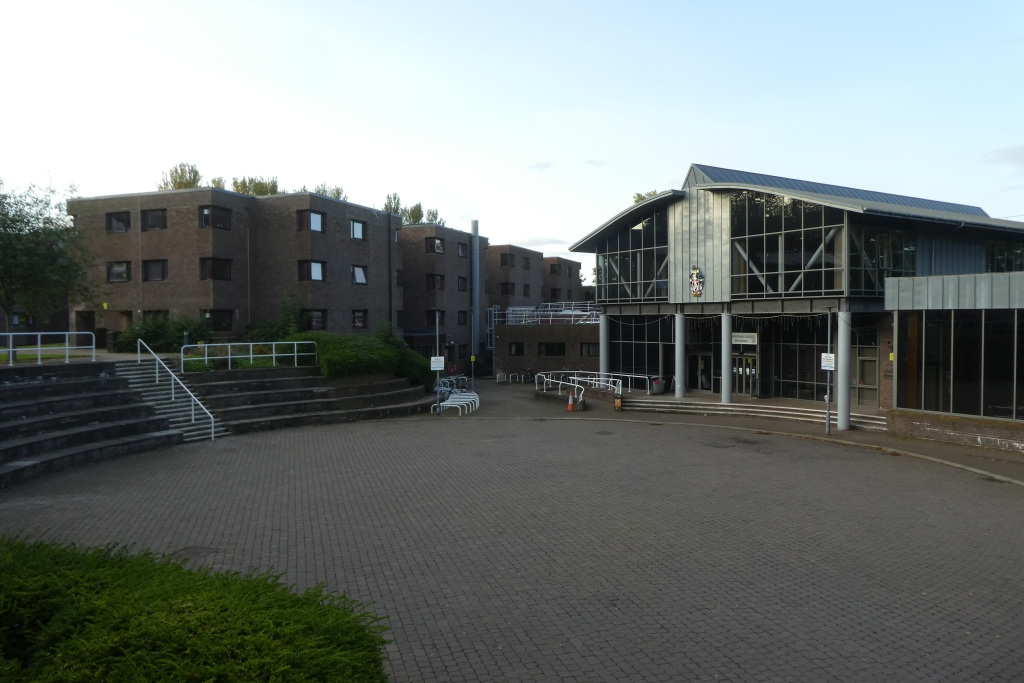
- Main Building, Collingwood College

- Arms of Collingwood College; Arms: Argent a Chevron between three Stags' Heads erased Sable a Bordure Gules charged with eight Crosses of St Cuthbert of the field And for the Crest On a Wreath Argent Gules and Sable issuant from the top of a Tower triple towered Or a Holly Tree fructed proper Mantled Sable doubled Argent
- Coordinates: 54.762778°N 1.576111°W
- Motto: French: Aime le meilleur
- Motto in English: Love the best
- Established: 1972
- Named for: Sir Edward Collingwood
- Principal: Thom Brooks
- Vice principal: Emma Brownlow
- Undergraduates: c. 1500
- Postgraduates: c. 290
- Website: Collingwood College

Map
- Location within Durham, England

Collingwood College is one of the constituent colleges of Durham University. Founded in 1972, it was the first Durham college that was purposely mixed-sex. It has over 1500 undergraduate students and just under 290 graduate students as of the year 2023/24, making it the largest college in Durham.

The college is the first to break off centuries of Durham traditions, as it is the first college to never police corridors and to never make the use of gown compulsory. The college also developed a reputation for its unrivalled supremacy in sports, having won the intercollegiate sports trophy for 11 years in a row.

The college was named after the mathematician Sir Edward Collingwood (1900–1970), who was a former Chair of the Council of Durham University.

== History ==
Plans for Collingwood began in 1960, as part of a programme of expansion that included both Van Mildert College and Trevelyan College. By 1962 it was determined that the new college was to be built on the site of Oswald House, with Richard Sheppard (architect of Churchill College, Cambridge) being appointed the following year. The remnants of the Oswald House estate can be seen in the landscaped grounds and mature trees that surround the college. Over the following years a series of funding issues and debates over the student composition of the new college meant that building on the site did not begin until August 1971. It was determined that the new college should be called Collingwood College, a name chosen from a shortlist of three (the others being Cromwell College and Lumley College). With building not being complete until 1973, Collingwood's first 66 freshers were housed in Van Mildert from October 1972.

== Buildings and facilities ==
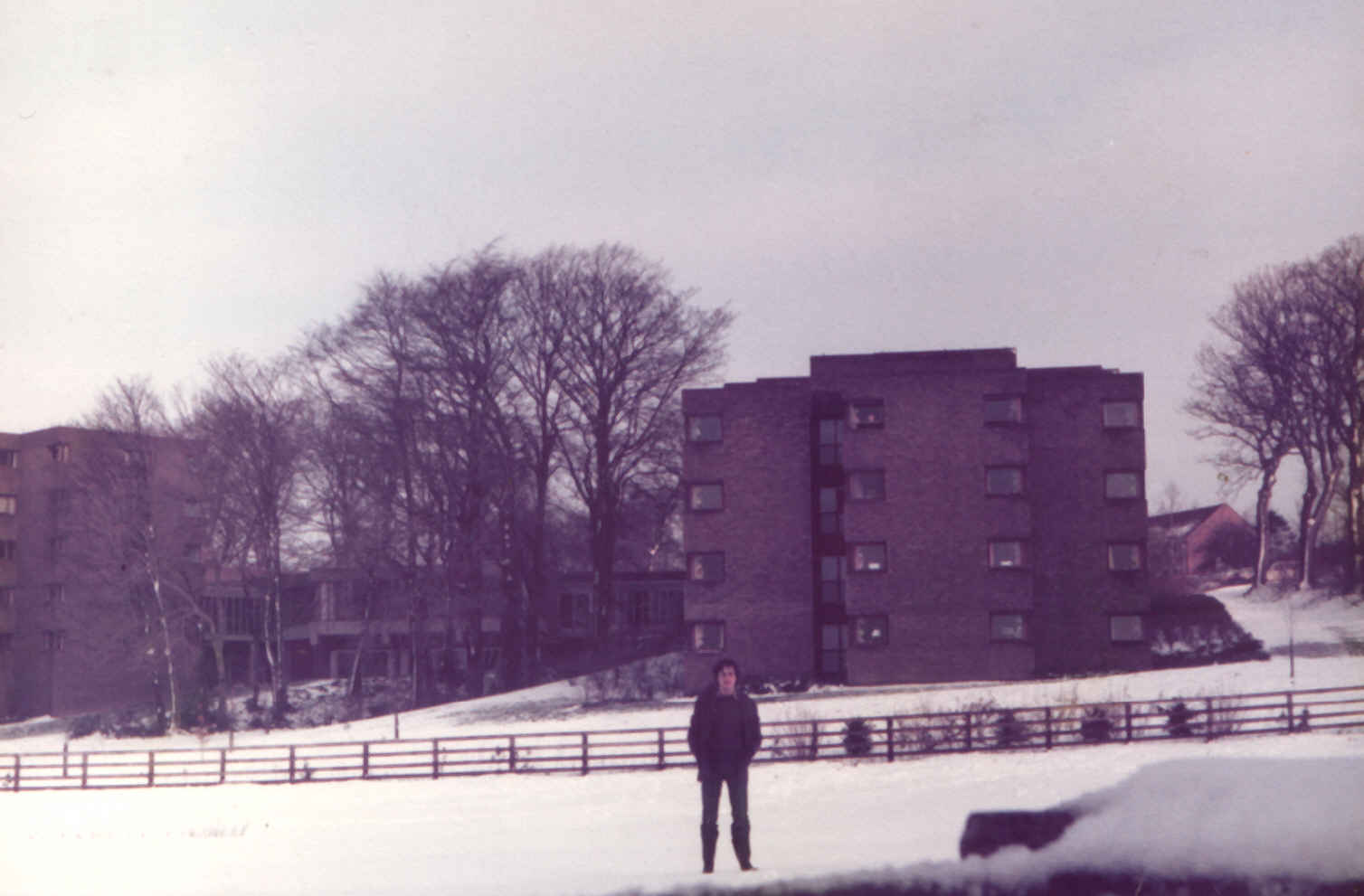
The college from the south, winter of 1979-80, showing the college's original two wings

The college is located to the south of Durham city centre, on South Road. The steep incline of this road leads to Collingwood and the surrounding colleges being commonly referred to as 'Hill' colleges. Extended in 1994, Collingwood now has over a thousand students allocated to it, and up to 565 bed spaces within the college. Accommodation is provided within three main wings: the original Durham and Northumbria wings and the newer, en-suite Cumbria wing. A separate block, York, is located away from the others and consists of flats used by fellows of the College and of the Institute of Advanced Study. Not all students live in college during their time at the university, but all students in their first year and the majority of those in their final year are allocated a place.

Although most Durham colleges are not used for teaching purposes, the college is equipped with a moderate library, music practice rooms and public computing facilities. Other welfare and entertainment facilities exist, including a bar, student-run shop, gym, television room, several common rooms, various sports facilities and a toastie and coffee shop - The Wood'n'Spoon. (Collingwood being the only Durham college to have one). During the summer of 2006, the music rooms were converted into a recording studio, with a new JCR officer position being created to run it.

The college is also a popular venue for academic conferences and other commercial events, often arranged and marketed by Event Durham. The income from these is used by the Colleges' Division to maintain and enhance college bedrooms and other facilities.

In June 2011 contractors began building work on a new gymnasium on the college campus, known as the Mark Hillery Gym. It opened in October 2012.

In 2017, the first in a series of renovations was unveiled. Collingwood now sports its own multi-use games area (MUGA), informally referred to by students as the "Collingwood Crumb". This can be booked for college sports training sessions, or for casual kickabouts when not in use by one of Collingwood's many teams.

In November 2018, after almost 18 months’ worth of building work, the facilities were completed. These include an expansion and equipment refresh of the Mark Hillery Gym and the replacement of the Bayley Room with the purpose-built Mark Hillery Performing Arts Centre. This performing arts space has a 150-person seated capacity.

The common room was also fully renovated; it is now equipped with a cinema room, pool tables, multiple televisions, as well as a relocated and fully refitted coffee shop. The college's central social hub, The Stag's Head college bar, was also renovated, bringing a dedicated darts area, conservatory and revamped bar terrace. Each year, a large music festival is organised by the college bar. The green space on the college grounds has also been drastically landscaped with fresh flowers and plants planted across the site. Collingwood has also recently invested in a media suite, and its latest addition is Mark Hillery Music Studios, completed opened in 2023. The building houses 2 practice rooms, and features a purpose built recording studio with control room, live room, vocal booth and drum booth. The control room boasts the region's only Dolby Atmos system with 13 PMC monitors, and the centerpiece is an SSL AWS 948 Delta mixing console.

== Organisation and administration ==
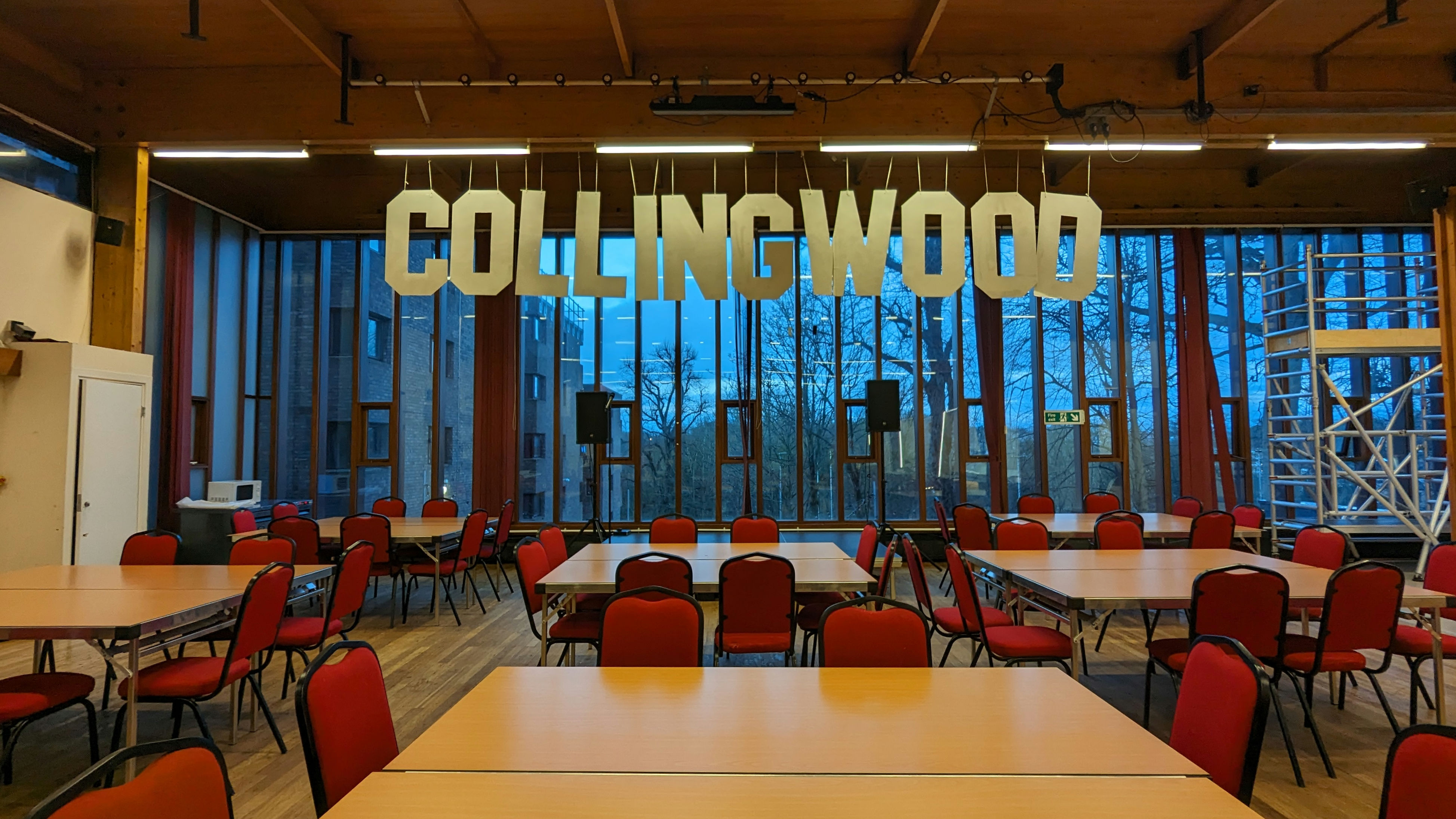
Collingwood College sign in the style of the Hollywood sign

The Head of College is the Principal. The incumbent Principal is Prof. Thom Brooks, whom succeeded Prof. Joe Elliot in September 2025.

=== List of Principals ===
- Peter C. Bayley (1972–1978)
- Anthony Tuck, FRHistS (1978–1987)
- Gerald Blake (1987–2001)
- Jane Taylor (2001–2007)
- F. Edward Corrigan, FRS (2008–2011)
- Joe Elliott, FAcSS (2011–2025)
- Thom Brooks, FAcSS, FRHistS, FRSA (2025 – present)

== Student life ==
As with all colleges in Durham, the students organise and democratise themselves by creating and running a body known as the Junior Common Room, or more commonly JCR. All students of the college are JCR members unless they specifically request otherwise. The JCR is led by the Exec Committee, which consists of thirteen elected positions. Two of these positions, those of JCR President and Bar Steward, are sabbatical. There is also a Middle Common Room for mostly Postgraduates, who are usually members of the JCR as well.

The college has a number of sports clubs and societies, for example:

- The Woodplayers (Collingwood's Drama Society)
- Collingwood College Arts Society
- Collingwood College Music Society
- Collingwood Choir
- Collingwood College Fashion Show
- Collingwood College Boat Club
- Collingwood College Rugby Football Club
- Collingwood College Cricket Club
- Collingwood College Association Football Club
- Collingwood College Dance Society
- Collingwood College Darts Club
- Collingwood Tech

Collingwood has non-gowned formals, at the end of which energetic renditions of "Country Roads" are common. It has always been the norm for students and staff to speak to each other informally, using first names rather than titles.

== Notable alumni ==
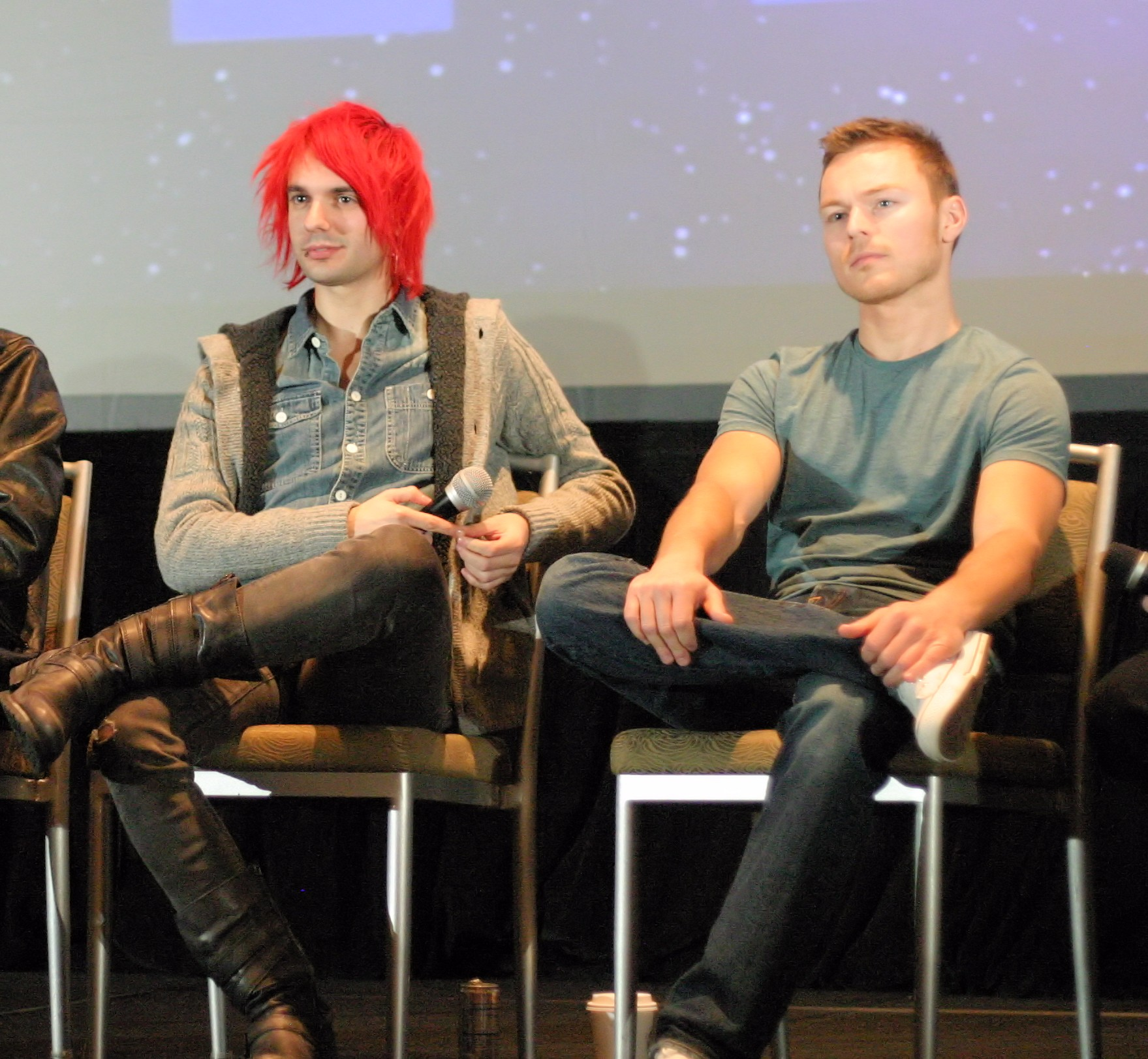
Benjamin Cook, English journalist, writer, and film-maker

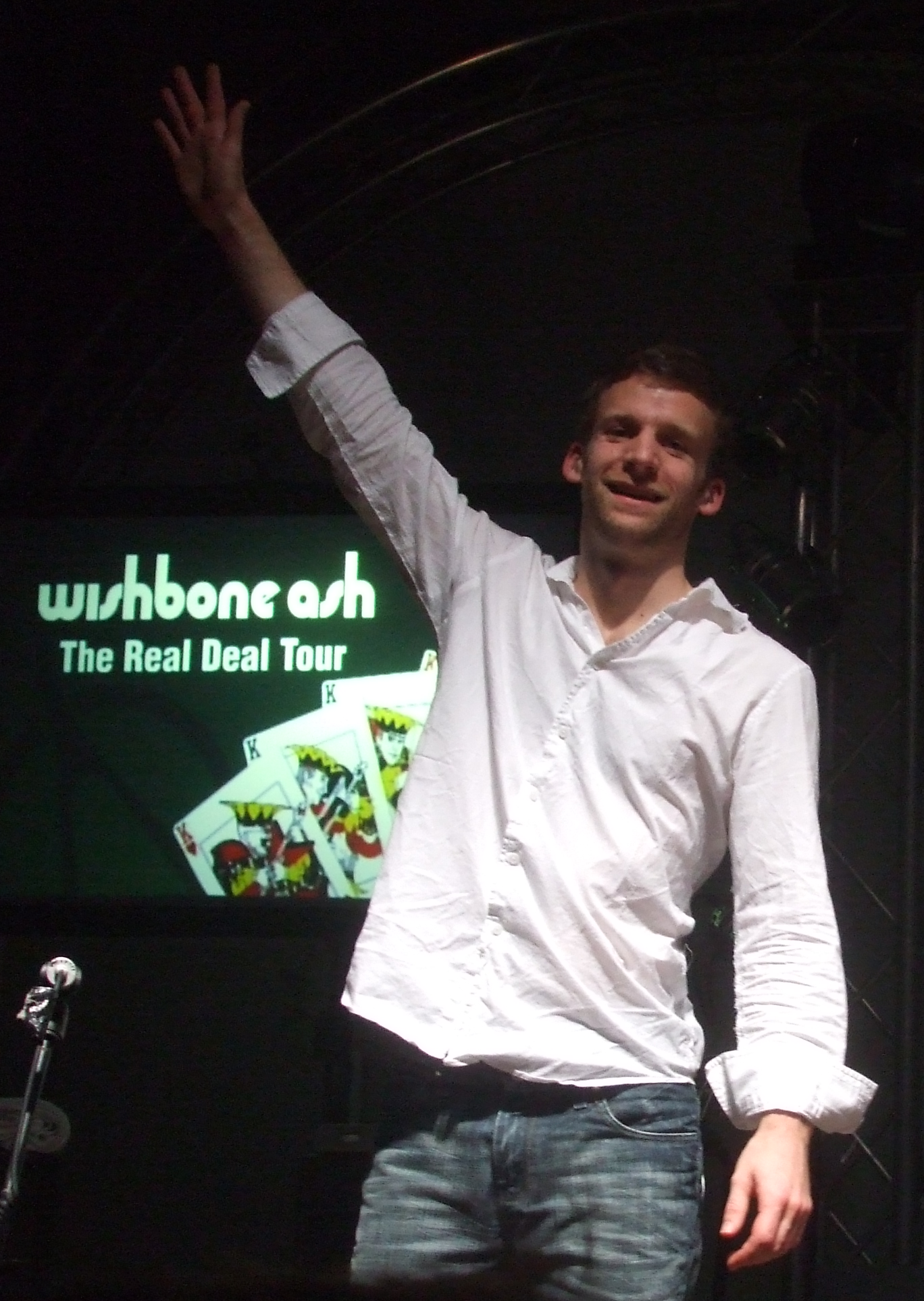
Joe Crabtree, drummer of the band Wishbone Ash

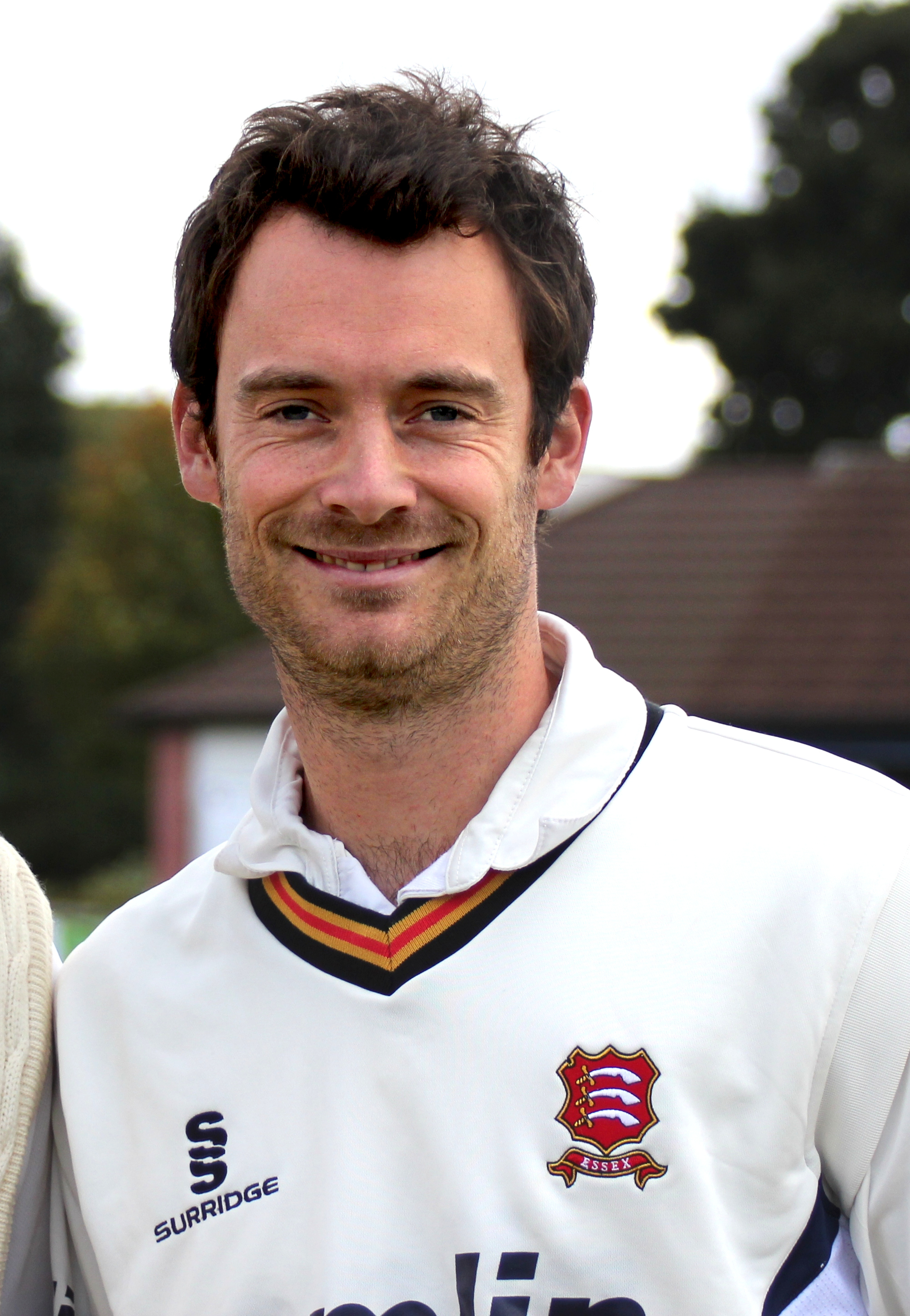
James Foster, Essex and England wicketkeeper

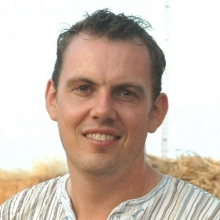
Stephen Davies, writer and children's author.

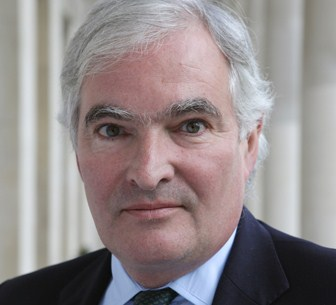
The Lord Henley, politician and Conservative member of the House of Lords.

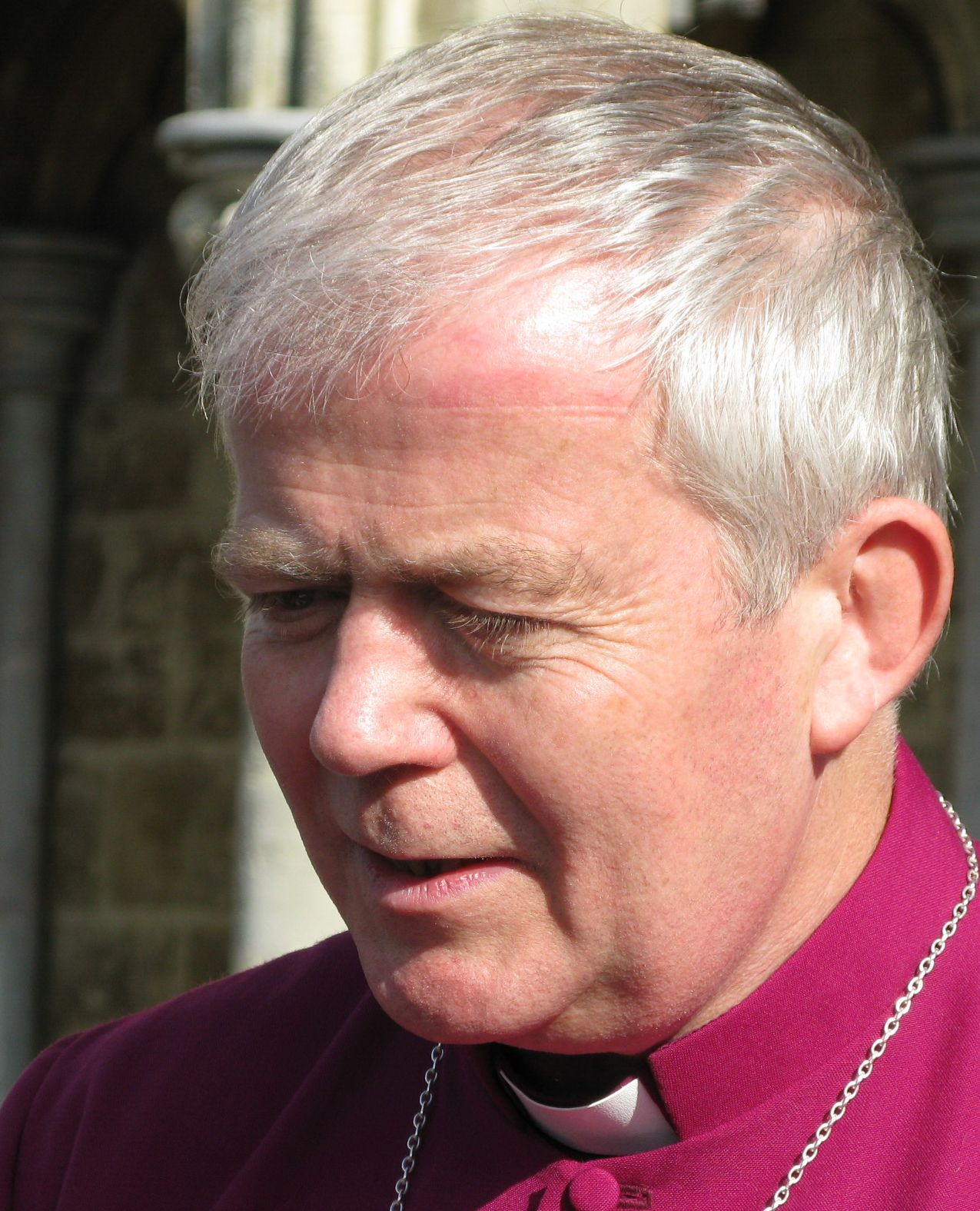
Nick Holtam, bishop of Salisbury

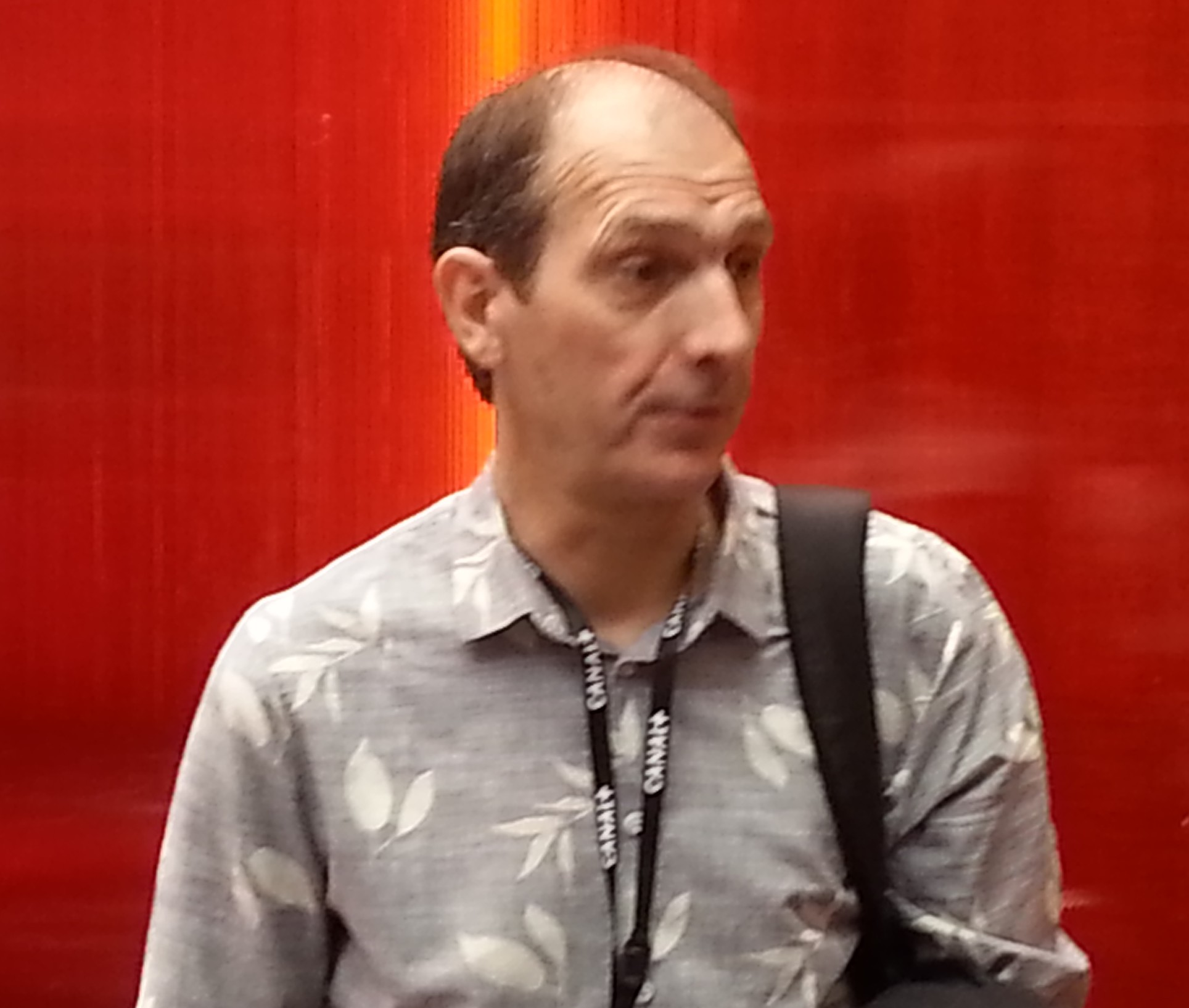
David Sproxton, one of the co-founders of the Aardman Animations studio.

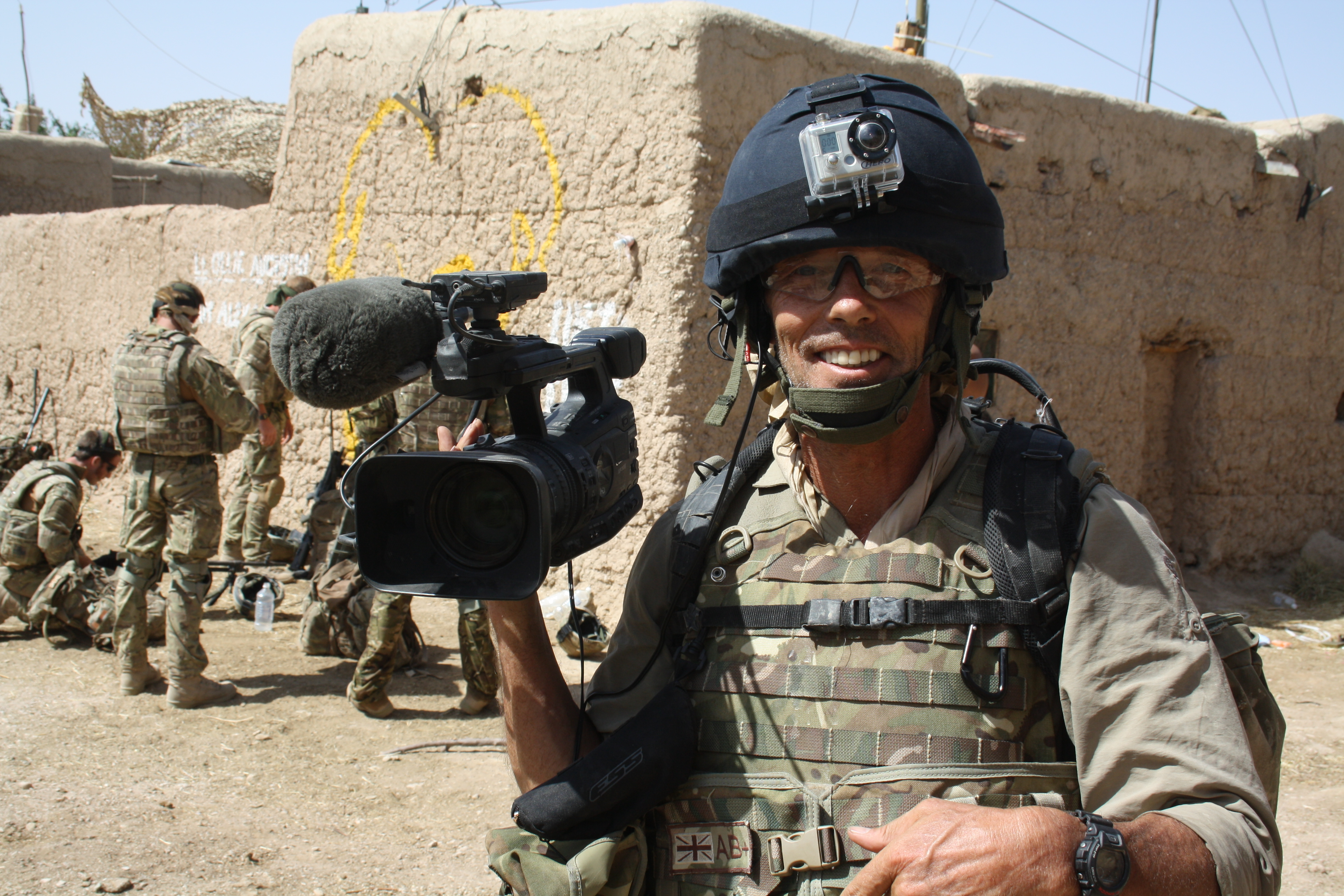
Chris Terrill, anthropologist, adventurer, author and filmmaker.
- Lieven Bertels, Musicologist and arts curator
- Benjamin Cook, Journalist and author
- Joe Crabtree, drummer of the band Wishbone Ash
- Stephen Davies, Children's Author
- Oliver Eden, 8th Baron Henley, Conservative Politician, former Minister of State
- Peter Elleray, Formula One and Le Mans Race Car Designer
- Mark Elliott, Travel Author
- Jonah Fisher, BBC Journalist
- Tim FitzHigham, British comedian
- Anna Foster, BBC Middle East correspondent
- Alexandra Hall Hall, former British ambassador to Georgia
- Lorraine Heggessey, controller of BBC One 2000–2005
- Nick Holtham – BA Geog., MA Theol. – Bishop of Salisbury
- Amjad Hussain, Rear Admiral Royal Navy
- Dominic Johnson, Baron Johnson of Lainston, Minister of State for Investment, former chairman of the Conservative Party
- Alex Loudon, Warwickshire and England cricketer
- David Kershaw, CEO of M&C Saatchi
- Andrew McFarlane – BA Hons Law (1975) – High Court Judge, Lord Justice of Appeal
- Stephen Rowbotham, Olympic rower
- Jonny Saunders, BBC Radio 2 Sports Presenter
- Will Smith, Durham County Cricket Club cricketer
- David Sproxton, Joint founder of Aardman Animations
- Chris Terrill, documentary maker, writer and adventurer
- Jan Thompson, British ambassador to Norway and formerly the Czech Republic
- Richard Watts, Leader of Islington Council

== Gallery ==
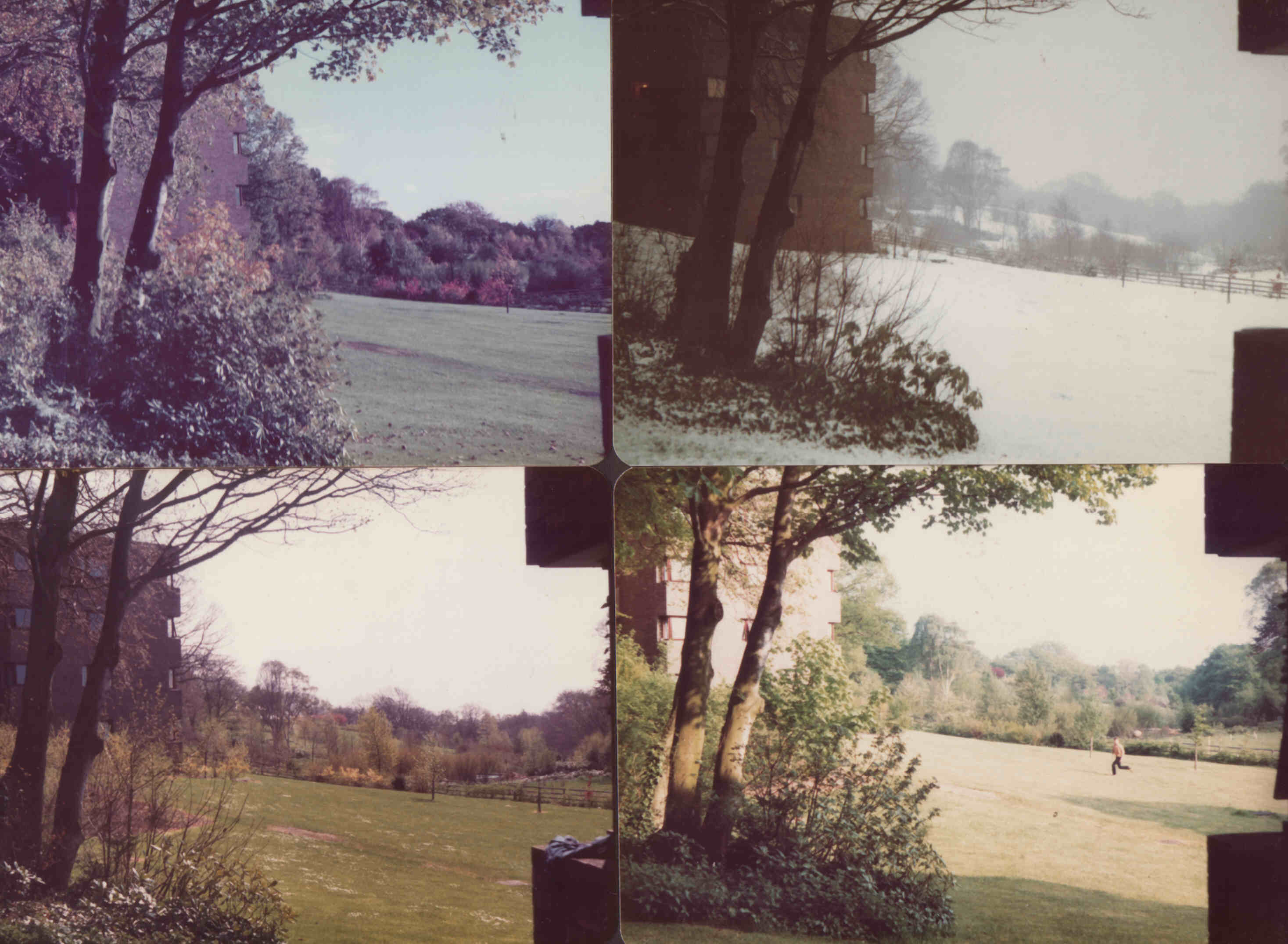
A series of views taken from Jarrow block across the college grounds between Autumn 1979 and Summer 1980

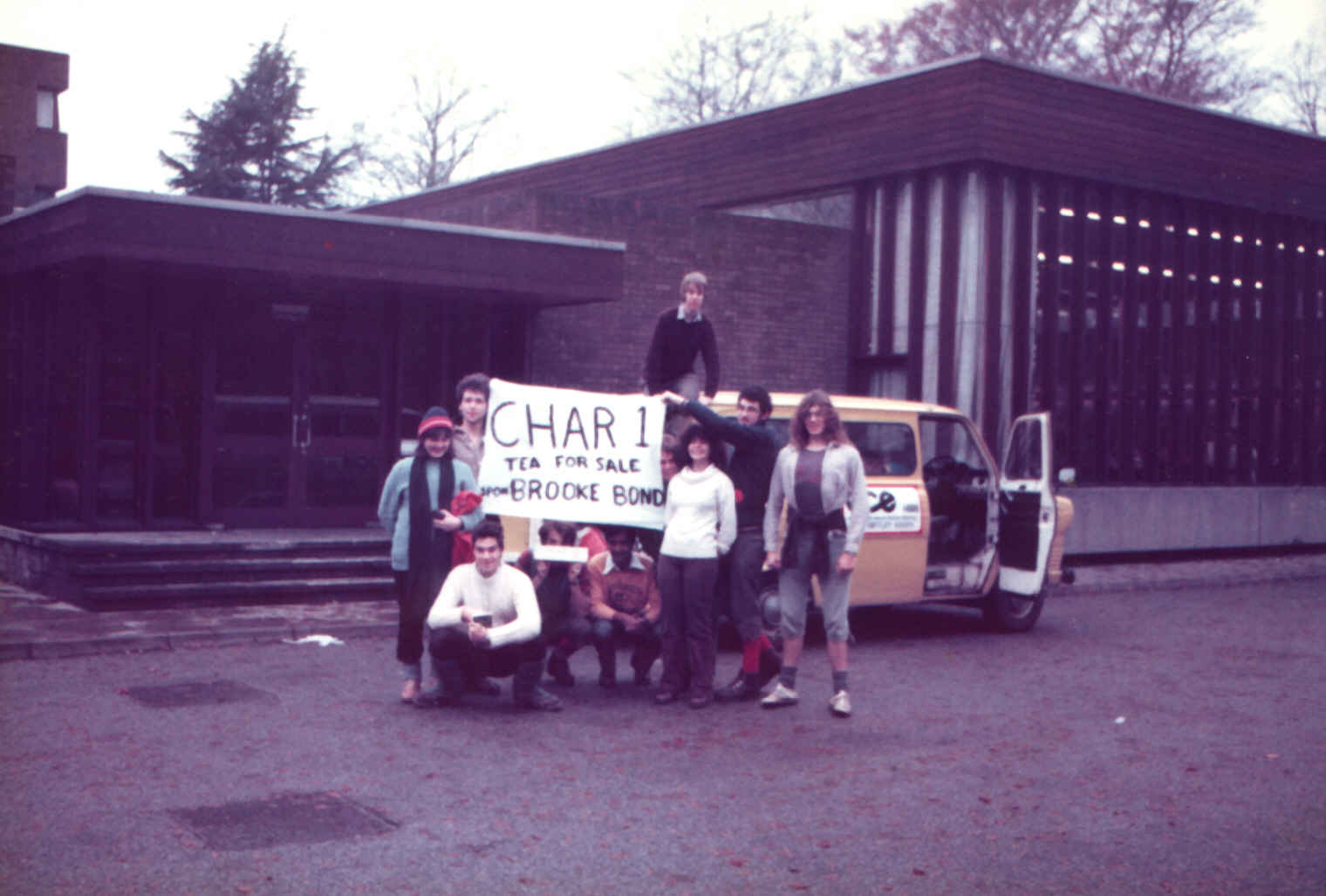
Collingwood College in c. 1979 showing the original entrance behind a gathering of students setting off for a charity event

Collingwood College in June 1991 showing the original entrance

Shot taken from the meadow on 26 June 1991, showing the Lilburn and Barnard wings

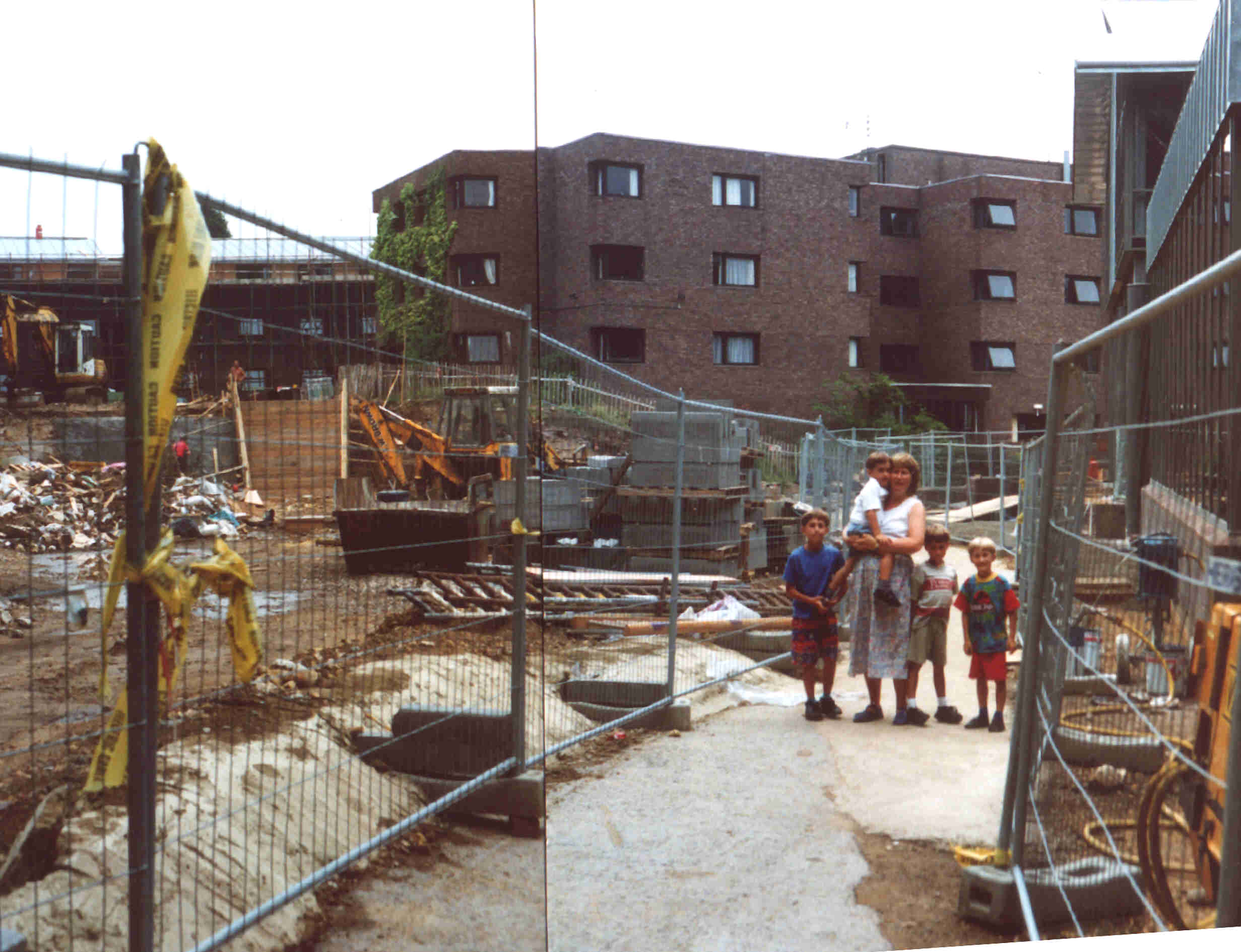
Collingwood College in 1994 during the major building work that greatly increased the college's size

== See also ==
- Colleges of Durham University
