= Sophia George (game designer) =

British video game designer

- Education: Norwich University of the Arts
- Occupation: Video game designer
- Employer: Victoria and Albert Museum (2013–2014)

Sophia George is a British video game designer who was the Victoria and Albert Museum's first video game designer-in-residence.

== Career ==
George received a bachelor's degree in Games Art and Design from the Norwich University of the Arts in 2011. As a student, George worked on the game Tick Tock Toys, along with other students from Abertay University and the Norwich University of the Arts. The game won the 2011 Dare to Be Digital contest and, in 2012, the BAFTA Ones to Watch Award. George then received a Professional Masters in Game Development from Abertay University in Dundee. She went on to establish a company, Swallowtail Games, with her collaborators on Tick Tock Toys, where they developed the game into a full game released in February 2013. In 2013, George was named one of BAFTA's Breakthrough Brits.

In October 2013, George was named the first ever video game designer-in-residence at the Victoria and Albert Museum, a position she held until March 2014. In April 2014, she returned to Scotland in order to complete her proposed game with Abertay University student collaborators. While a resident, George was tasked with creating a game that was inspired by a piece from the 1500–1900 Britain galleries. She also had to participate in activities involving games, including workshops and ongoing displays of her work. She spent months selecting the subject for her game, and finally decided on the works of William Morris. She specifically selected his 1883 Strawberry Thief pattern as her subject. In 2014, she released the Strawberry Thief for the iPad. In the game, players control a flying bird around a screen, while the bird colours the pattern. The game was praised by Pocket Gamer for its "charming mix of reaction-based tinkering and logic-teasing action".

George later worked with primary schools in Dundee, researching creative ideas for games and introducing game design to the children. She later shifted to a career in marketing, and as of 2017 worked as a marketing manager for game developer Frontier Developments.
