= Strawberry Thief =

1883 textile pattern by William Morris

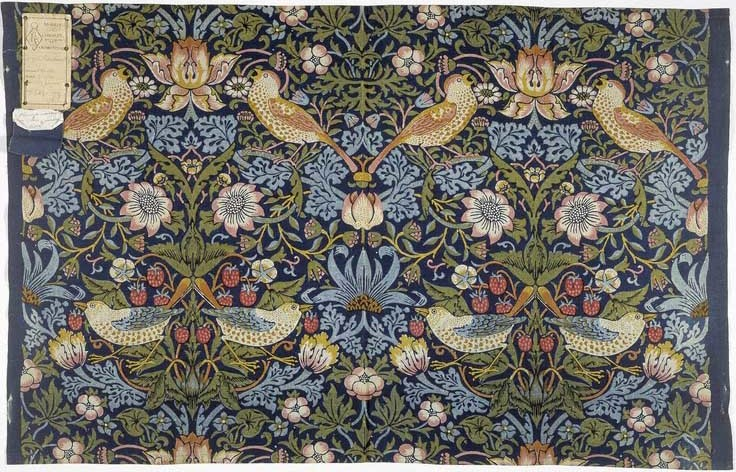
Strawberry Thief, 1883, William Morris (1834-1896) V&A Museum no. T.586-1919

Strawberry Thief is one of William Morris's most popular repeating designs for textiles. It takes as its subject the thrushes that Morris found stealing fruit in his kitchen garden of his countryside home, Kelmscott Manor, in Oxfordshire. To print the pattern Morris used the painstaking indigo dye textile printing method he admired above all forms of printing. He first attempted to print by this method in 1875 but it was not until 1881, when he moved into his factory at Merton Abbey, near Wimbledon, that he succeeded. In May 1883 Morris wrote to his daughter, "I was a great deal at Merton last week ... anxiously superintending the first printing of the Strawberry thief, which I think we shall manage this time." Pleased with this success, he registered the design with the Patents Office. This pattern was the first design using the technique in which red (in this case alizarin dye) and yellow (weld) were added to the basic blue and white ground. Discharge printing was used.

The entire process would have taken days to complete and consequently, this was one of Morris & Co.'s most expensive cottons. Customers were not put off by the high price, however, and Strawberry Thief proved to be one of Morris' most commercially successful patterns. This printed cotton furnishing textile was intended to be used for curtains or draped around walls (a form of interior decoration advocated by William Morris), or for loose covers on furniture.

== In popular culture ==
In 2014, video game designer Sophia George released a game based on the Strawberry Thief pattern. She produced the game while working as the first Game Designer in Residence at the Victoria and Albert Museum. The player controls a bird flying around the screen, gradually colouring in the pattern.

The Strawberry Thief, the 2019 novel by Joanne Harris, draws inspiration from the Morris design.

The 2022 Gabrielle Zevin novel Tomorrow, and Tomorrow, and Tomorrow includes a discussion of the tapestry.

== See also ==
- Indigo dye
- Woodblock printing on textiles

== Bibliography ==
- Jackson, Anna, ed. (2001). V&A: A Hundred Highlights. V&A Publications. ISBN 1-85177-365-7
