= Elena Grigorenko =

American clinical psychologist

- Born: Elena Leonidovna Grigorenko
- Education: Moscow State University; Yale University
- Awards: Distinguished Award for Early Career Contribution to Developmental Psychology from the American Psychological Association (2004)
- Scientific career
- Fields: Human genetics Psychology
- Workplaces: Baylor College of Medicine; University of Houston
- Thesis: A family study of dyslexia (1996)
- Doctoral advisors: David L. Pauls; Robert J. Sternberg

Elena L. Grigorenko is an American clinical psychologist and the Hugh Roy and Lillie Cranz Cullen Distinguished Professor of Psychology at the University of Houston, where she has taught since September 2015. She is also a professor in the Department of Molecular and Human Genetics at Baylor College of Medicine.

== Biography ==
Grigorenko received her Ph.D. in general psychology from Moscow State University in 1990, and her Ph.D. in developmental psychology and genetics from Yale University in 1996. Before joining the faculty of the University of Houston, she was the Emily Fraser Beede Professor of Developmental Disabilities, Child Studies, Psychology, and Epidemiology and Public Health at Yale University.

== Honors and awards ==
Grigorenko has contributed to the publication of over 500 peer-reviewed articles, book chapters, and books. She has received the American Psychological Association's Distinguished Award for Early Career Contribution to Developmental Psychology and the American Educational Research Association Sylvia Scribner Award, among other awards.

Grigorenko was awarded the Big 12 Faculty Award in 2026

== Selected works ==
- Elliott, Julian; Grigorenko, Elena L. (2014). The dyslexia debate. New York, NY: Cambridge University Press. ISBN 978-0521119863.
