= Chocolat (novel) =

1999 novel by Joanne Harris

- First edition cover
- Author: Joanne Harris
- Language: English
- Genre: Novel
- Publisher: Doubleday
- Publication date: 4 March 1999
- Publication place: United Kingdom
- Media type: Print (hardback and paperback)
- Pages: 394 (first edition, hardback)
- ISBN: 0-385-41064-6 (first edition, hardback)
- OCLC: 40881895
- Preceded by: Vianne
- Followed by: The Lollipop Shoes

Chocolat is a 1999 novel by Joanne Harris, which was adapted in 2000 as a film of the same name. It also exists as an audiobook, narrated by the author.

Set in the French village of Lansquenet-sous-Tannes between Mardi Gras and Easter Sunday, it follows the story of Vianne Rocher, a single mother who arrives with her six-year-old daughter Anouk to open a chocolaterie opposite the church. Their arrival coincides with the beginning of Lent, the traditional season of fasting, and scandalises Francis Reynaud, the priest, and his supporters. Tensions run high, and the community is increasingly divided between the abstinence of the Church and the indulgence of chocolate.

The book was a bestseller on publication, going on to sell over 1 million copies in the UK and 35 million copies worldwide. It won the Creative Freedom Award in 1999 and was shortlisted for the Whitbread Prize.

The Lollipop Shoes, the second book in the series, was published in the United Kingdom in 2007 (released in 2008 as The Girl with No Shadow in the US) and in 2012, the third in the series was published, entitled Peaches for Monsieur le Curé (Peaches for Father Francis in the US), followed by The Strawberry Thief, in 2019. In 2025, Orion Books published a prequel, Vianne.

== Background ==
Harris has stated that she planned the novel during the Easter holidays, while she was accompanying a school trip to France. At this time Harris was teaching French in a boys' grammar school in Leeds; had a four-year-old daughter; and gave private lessons and marked exam papers to earn extra money.

Harris has indicated that several of the characters were influenced by individuals in her life: the young Anouk and her imaginary rabbit, Pantoufle, were both inspired by Harris' four-year-old, and Harris' strong-willed and independent great-grandmother influenced her portrayal of both Vianne and the elderly Armande.

Harris had no expectations that the book would be a success, having been told that her style of writing was "neither commercial nor fashionable enough to succeed, and that there was no market for books set in rural France, filled with self-indulgent descriptions of food." She describes how she wrote Chocolat "on Sunday mornings, on the living room floor with my laptop, while my husband was at work and my mother looked after our daughter."

Of writing the book, Harris says:

It was rather a different story from the ones I had written previously. I'd never written about motherhood before, or about my own family. It felt as if I were finding my voice for the first time as an author, and it was exciting and new. My husband, Kevin, followed the tale page by page as I wrote it. I finished the first draft in less than four months, with hardly any revisions.

== Plot ==
Vianne Rocher and her six-year-old daughter Anouk, arrive in the French village of Lansquenet-sous-Tannes "on the wind of the Carnival", and begin to renovate a disused bakery opposite the church. The village priest, Francis Reynaud, who already disapproves of Vianne's status as a single mother, is horrified to discover that she intends to open a chocolate shop to coincide with the Lenten season of fasting.

The story unfolds via two first-person narrators, Vianne herself and the priest, Reynaud, who addresses his account to his confessor.

Vianne reveals that her mother was a witch, and that she herself has inherited similar beliefs and abilities. Her mother and she were wanderers, moving from one city to another, driven by the changing wind. They were born with gifts, and used a kind of "domestic magic" to earn their living. Throughout her life, Vianne has been running from the "Man in Black", a recurring figure in her mother's folklore. When her mother dies of cancer, Vianne continues on her own, trying to evade the Man in Black and the mysterious force of the wind and settle down to a normal life.

The chocolaterie is a dream of hers. She has a talent for cooking and a naturally empathic personality, which enables her to understand and to help her customers with their problems. She builds a group of regular customers, including Armande Voizin, an elderly lady who has secretly been diagnosed with diabetes, Guillaume Duplessis, an elderly man devoted to his dog, and Joséphine Muscat, the battered wife of the local café owner. As Vianne's shop becomes more popular, Reynaud's disapproval grows. Enlisting some of the more conservative villagers, he attempts to discourage his congregation from associating with her. Some people stay away, but not for long. His conflict with her becomes a personal crusade.

Tensions in the community increase when a group of travellers, led by the unflinching Roux, moor their boats on the nearby river. Vianne welcomes them, whereas Reynaud disapproves of their way of life. He manages to convince most businesses in the village to refuse to serve the travellers. Roux and his friends invite Vianne to their own celebrations by the river, but Muscat, the abusive husband of Joséphine, starts a petrol fire on Roux's boat, forcing the travellers to move on. This act convinces Joséphine to leave her husband, and she moves into the shop with Vianne and Anouk. Roux stays nearby, making a home in a derelict building while he works to restore his boat. He continues doing odd jobs for Vianne and Armande, while Vianne and Joséphine prepare for Easter and the Festival of Chocolate they have planned to celebrate on Easter Sunday.

Meanwhile, Armande, who is estranged from her daughter and forbidden to see her grandson, has been meeting the boy in secret at the chocolaterie. As a thank-you gesture to Vianne, she organizes a birthday party, to which she invites her grandson and all her friends, including Roux and the travellers. Vianne is anxious about Armande's health, and warns her not to over-indulge, but Armande refuses to listen, implying that this is a farewell party. Armande dies in her sleep later that night, while Vianne and Roux have sex in the garden after everyone else has gone home.

The morning the festival is supposed to take place, Reynaud breaks into the shop, meaning to vandalize the stock, but is distracted by the chocolates in the window display and gorges himself into a stupor. He is discovered in the shop window by Vianne before he can do too much damage. The chocolate festival goes ahead, with great success. At the end of the story, Vianne discovers that she is pregnant by Roux, although it is not clear whether they will raise the child together, or whether Vianne will move on.

== Themes ==
The novel deals with the "conflict between indulgence and guilt, motherhood and patriarchy, with chocolate as the central metaphor." In the novel it represents "love, tolerance and forgiveness", as well as guilt and temptation.

The relationship between Vianne and Anouk is also central to the novel. Of this, Harris says: "My daughter was four when I wrote Chocolat... I like to think that caused the change; for the first time I felt ready to write like a mother, to try and express some of what motherhood felt to me."

In Chocolat Harris also explores the ideas of community and "otherness", saying: "People who don't belong are good at observing those who do." And Vianne is very much an outsider: she does not attend Mass, she has no husband, wears different clothes and makes no attempt to conform, which puts her in a good position to observe the people around her.

Magic is an important theme in the book, but a magic that is part of daily life, accessed through cooking. The New York Times says:

The gods of legend may dine well in their celestial palaces, but the true sorcery of cooking cannot take place unless the cook and the guests are mortal. This paradox of the human condition is surely one of the messages of Harris's book - "so much loving preparation, so much art and experience, put into a pleasure that can last only a moment."

Harris speaks of approaching the idea of magic in a "pragmatic way," exploring the individual's perception of what magic means as well as the more traditional view, and saying: "if it works, you don't have to name it."

== Main characters ==
- Vianne Rocher, single mother of Anouk. She is described as tall, with black curly hair and "dark eyes that seem pupilless". She has a keen sense of what people need, and great powers of intuition.
- Francis Reynaud, a village priest in his thirties. He is fanatical and puritanical in his beliefs, due to the inspiration of Père Michel, his predecessor, and his troubled childhood.
- Anouk Rocher, Vianne's six-year-old daughter. A precocious child with an imaginary rabbit, Pantoufle.
- Josephine Muscat, the wife of Paul-Marie Muscat. At the beginning of the book she is a cowed, fearful figure, seeking refuge in kleptomania, but encouraged by Vianne, she leaves her abusive husband and becomes independent.
- Paul-Marie Muscat, Joséphine's husband. He beats his wife and drinks too much.
- Armande Voizin, mother of Caroline Clairmont. A widow in her eighties, she is the first to anticipate the changes Vianne's arrival will bring. She has a strong disdain for Reynaud and the group of villagers under his influence. She has diabetes, which causes her to suffer from diabetic retinopathy.
- Caroline Clairmont, a staunch follower of Reynaud. Has a poor relationship with her mother, who she feels is a bad influence on her son, Luc.
- Luc Clairmont, Caroline Clairmont's thirteen-year-old son, whom she has raised with obsessive care. Luc has a penchant for the dark and bizarre which he's been hiding for fear of upsetting his mother. He has a stutter, although it lessens in the company of his grandmother.
- Guillaume, and elderly gentleman, devoted to his sick dog, Charly.
- Narcisse, local farmer and florist.
- Roux, a red-haired river-traveller and the biological father of Vianne's unborn child.

== Reception ==
The novel won the Creative Freedom Award (2000) and the Whittaker Gold and Platinum Awards (2001, 2012), selling over a million copies in the UK and over 35 million copies worldwide. It was shortlisted for the Whitbread Prize and the Scripter Award (2001).

In 2012 The Guardian placed it at number 61 on a list of the "100 bestselling books of all time."

Publishers Weekly awarded Chocolat a starred review, saying: "Gourmand Harris' tale of sin and guilt embodies a fond familiarity with things French that will doubtless prove irresistible to many readers." The New York Times said: "Harris' description of the chocolate festival also describes the novel: ''It is an amazement of riches. . . . Try me. Test me. Taste me."

Writing for the Literary Review, Sophia Watson asked: "Is this the best book ever written?" going on to say: "This is a truly excellent book, one of the best it has been my pleasure to read in the line of duty for years. Joanne Harris achieves everything a novelist should aim for, with no sense of effort or striving."

Author Charles de Lint praised the novel, saying "Harris' prose is an absolute delight", and comparing Chocolat to Like Water for Chocolate, although Kirkus Reviews described it as "cloying."

At the 2025 Chelsea Flower Show a new rose, Rosa Vianne's Chocolat, was launched in honour of the novel's protagonist.

== Setting ==
The village of Lansquenet-sous-Tannes is a fictional village in the Gers region of South-Western France, featured in several of Harris' novels. Situated on the (imaginary) river Tannes, a tributary of the Garonne, the name has been described by Harris as a "joke," saying: “Lansquenet” is an old French children's game, and “soutane” is the French word for a priest's cassock."

Harris has stated that Lansquenet-sous-Tannes was partly based on the town of Nérac, on the river Baïse, where Harris had relatives, and which is very close to a village called Vianne. Speaking of her decision to set the novel in an imaginary place, rather than a real one, Harris says:

I had chosen not to set Chocolat in a real place. I wanted the freedom that fiction affords: the freedom to run things as I choose; to depict the France of my childhood in all its sweet nostalgia. As a result, for all its modern references, the world of Chocolat had a certain timeless, Brigadoon-like quality.

Lansquenet has acquired a significant following among Harris' readers. In a piece written for the Telegraph in July 2012, she describes her own affection for Lansquenet, as well as that of her readers, many of whom have written to her to say that they have found the place, and therefore know that it exists.

== Film adaptation ==
The film adaptation was released in 2000, directed by Lasse Hallström and starring Juliette Binoche, Judi Dench, Alfred Molina, Lena Olin and Johnny Depp. It was nominated for 8 BAFTAS and 5 Oscars.

== Release details ==
- 1999, UK, Doubleday (ISBN 0-385-41064-6), Pub date 4 March 1999, hardback (First edition)
- 2000, UK, Black Swan (ISBN 0-552-99848-6), Pub date 2 March 2000, paperback
- 1999, USA, Viking Adult (ISBN 0-670-88179-1), Pub date February 1999, hardback
- 2000, USA, Penguin Books (ISBN 0-14-028203-3), Pub date January 2000, paperback
- 2000, USA, Penguin Books (ISBN 0-14-100018-X), Pub date November 2000, paperback (film tie-in edition)
- 2000, Australia, Black Swan (ISBN 0-552-99893-1), Pub date 2000, paperback (film tie-in edition)

== Sequels ==
A sequel to Chocolat, entitled The Lollipop Shoes (retitled The Girl With No Shadow in the US), was published in 2007. A further chapter in Vianne's story, Peaches for Monsieur le Curé (titled Peaches for Father Francis in the US) was published in 2012, which was followed by The Strawberry Thief in 2019, and Vianne in 2025.
