= Peaches for Monsieur le Curé =

2012 novel by Joanne Harris

Peaches For Monsieur Le Curé
- First edition
- Author: Joanne Harris
- Language: English
- Genre: Novel, literary fiction
- Publisher: Doubleday
- Publication date: April 2012
- Publication place: United Kingdom
- Media type: Print (hardback & paperback)
- Preceded by: Chocolat, The Lollipop Shoes
- Followed by: The Strawberry Thief

Peaches For Monsieur le Curé is a novel by the author Joanne Harris—retitled Peaches for Father Francis in the U.S.—and is the third in the series featuring Vianne Rocher, the first being Chocolat and the second, The Lollipop Shoes. Set in 2010 France at the beginning of Ramadan, it is the tale of two communities, culturally different, but in many ways alike, and the woman who brings them together.

== Plot ==
Vianne Rocher, Roux, Anouk and Rosette are living on a houseboat on the River Seine. Anouk is fifteen and Rosette is eight. Vianne believes that she may have found peace. Then she receives a letter from Lansquenet-sous-Tannes from Armande Voizin. Armande died eight years ago; she had left the letter, sealed within a letter for Luc, her grandson, when he reaches the age of 21, in which Armande predicts that Lansquenet will need Vianne again, and asks Vianne to visit, if only to put flowers on an old lady's grave. Vianne is intrigued and, seeking an excuse to escape the heat of the Paris summer, takes her daughters to Lansquenet.

The major change is the settlement of Muslims from North Africa in the old tanneries on the other side of the river. Here is a mosque complete with minaret. Reynaud, the priest, Vianne's adversary in Chocolat, has had trouble with these Moroccans, having been accused of setting fire to the Muslim school where Vianne's chocolaterie was; Reynaud denies all knowledge of the fire, but "the court of public opinion" has already found him guilty.

The school was run by a Muslim woman called Inès, who wears the full niqab face-veil, and who is viewed with suspicion from both sides of the river. The Moroccan community is filled with gossip about her; the French locals are suspicious of her because of the veil she wears, blaming her for the increasing numbers of women now wearing the niqab. Vianne is drawn to Inès, partly because she was living in Vianne's chocolate shop before it burnt down, and partly because Inès reminds her of aspects of herself. Both are single women with a young daughter; both are the subject of gossip and speculation. Unlike Vianne, Inès does not seem to want to mix or be accepted into the community. She remains silent and aloof, impervious to kindness or offers of help. Even Vianne's chocolates have no power over her, as she and the rest of the Moroccan community are fasting for Ramadan.

Meanwhile, Vianne's old friend Joséphine, the battered wife in Chocolat who now runs the village café, has also changed. She greets Vianne with affection, but seems embarrassed to see her. Vianne soon learns that Joséphine has had a son, a boy called Jean-Philippe (Pilou), who is now eight years old. Vianne finds it hard to understand how her old friend could have concealed this fact from her for all this time, and tries to find out who Pilou's father is, with no success. Vianne begins to suspect that Roux, whom she once believed might form a loving relationship with Joséphine, may be the boy's father.

Vianne decides to stay for a few more days, if only to discover the truth behind the mystery of Pilou's parentage and the fire at the old chocolaterie. She finds out that her old adversary, Francis Reynaud, is about to lose his parish. A younger, trendier priest, Père Henri Lemaître, has taken over his duties pending an inquiry into the arson attack, and Reynaud is unhappy and humiliated. Vianne promises to help him clear his name and regain his position. She moves into Armande's old house, now owned by Luc Clairmont, and begins to get to know the Moroccan community. She befriends one of the Muslim families, and slowly begins to earn their trust. Gradually she learns of the tensions that run beneath the surface; of family feuds; malicious rumours; political machinations and prejudices on both sides of the river. Behind all of these tensions stands the figure of Inès Bencharki. Is she the cause of the unrest, or just another victim?

== Themes ==
- Identity.

The novel draws heavily on the theme of identity: of how we see others, how we judge on appearances, and what we choose to reveal (or hide) about ourselves. Inès wears the niqab both to hide and to reveal things about herself; she is judged, mistrusted and feared by some members of the non-Muslim community uniquely on the basis of what she wears.

Harris said, in a Q & A with Red Magazine Online: "The new book became contemporary because of all the changes that France was undergoing at the time, and especially the debate about banning the niqab (the Islamic veil). It started me thinking once more about the themes of identity and alienation I'd already touched upon in previous books, and how I might revisit them in a different way."

- Tolerance/intolerance.

A recurrent theme of Harris', the book describes aspects of cultural and religious intolerance within both the Muslim and the Catholic communities, whilst demonstrating how similar attitudes are in both camps.

- Secrets and lies

As in many of Harris' books, the main characters often have dark secrets to hide. The past is seen as an inescapable force that draws characters in and makes it hard for them to build satisfying relationships.

- Food.

As in Chocolat, Harris uses food as a metaphor both for tolerance and acceptance. It also serves as a means of entering another culture on a very basic level. In Harris' books, a gift of food is often an expression of affection, and Vianne's cooking (and her chocolates) serve as a means of breaking down inhibitions and inviting confidences.

In an interview with the New Zealand Herald, she said: "It's like the first elementary contact. It doesn't necessarily offer a vast amount of understanding, but it's the first contact with a culture because it's something that everybody can understand. It's not like a language that you have to learn or a culture that you have to buy into. It's a simple way of offering or accepting hospitality. It's the first few stumbling phrases in something that will later become a dialogue."

== Reception ==
The novel was largely well-received, with Kirkus Reviews commenting on the depictions of cooking and "indolent pace" of the novel as well as its "breathtaking finish." Red Magazine called it "wide-ranging, powerful and very readable," while Publishers Weekly called it a "sensitively told tale."
