= The Lollipop Shoes =

Novel by Joanne Harris

- First edition
- Author: Joanne Harris
- Language: English
- Genre: Novel
- Publisher: Doubleday
- Publication date: 2 May 2007
- Publication place: United Kingdom
- Media type: Print (Hardback & Paperback)
- Pages: 352 pp (first edition, hardback)
- ISBN: 9780385609487
- OCLC: 40881895
- Preceded by: Chocolat
- Followed by: Peaches for Monsieur le Curé (Peaches for Father Francis in the US)

The Lollipop Shoes is a 2007 novel by Joanne Harris—a sequel to her best-selling Chocolat. Darker than Chocolat—more openly mystical—this story is set between Halloween and Christmas.

No longer living in Lansquenet-sous-Tannes, Vianne Rocher and her two daughters, Anouk and Rosette, are settled in the Montmartre quarter of Paris. Vianne has given up magic and her mother's way of life in an attempt to create a stable environment for her daughters. However, this is changed by the arrival of the mysterious and free-spirited Zozie de l'Alba, who appears first as a friend, but ultimately, as a predator.

The novel was released in the U.S. in 2008 as The Girl with No Shadow.

== Plot ==
The novel is told using a multiple narrative technique, alternating first-person chapters in the voices of Vianne, Anouk and Zozie.

Vianne Rocher, now with two daughters, Anouk and Rosette, has forsaken magic and adventure for a monotonous life running a small chocolaterie in the Montmartre district of Paris. Vianne is now known as the widow Yanne Charbonneau and Anouk is now Annie. Concealing her magical nature, she feels she is doing the right thing, but she is dissatisfied: there is friction with Anouk; money is short; there is pressure from her landlord, Thierry Le Tresset, and she no longer has the inclination to make hand-made, quality chocolate.

Anouk is an unhappy adolescent. She is bullied at school and made to feel an outcast. She dislikes living in Paris and her situation seems hopeless and set to get worse.

Zozie de l'Alba comes into their lives, bringing her magic and enchantment. She seems to be exactly what Vianne herself used to be: a benevolent force and a free spirit, helping people wherever she goes. But Zozie is a thief of identities, maybe even a collector of souls. She has her eye on Vianne's life, and begins to insinuate herself into the family.

She is soon working at the chocolaterie, helping and understanding everyone as Vianne used to do. She helps Anouk to deal with the bullies who torment her at school. The shop begins to prosper under her guidance, much to Thierry's displeasure. When Roux, not knowing that he is Rosette's father, arrives at their shop, Zozie helps Vianne to decide between a stable life with Thierry and a romance with the man she loves.

But as Vianne's life begins to improve little by little under Zozie's influence, it becomes clear that all this must come at a terrible price. Finally, Vianne is forced to confront Zozie on her own ground, to reclaim her magic and her identity and to fight back - but is it too late?

== Main characters ==
- Vianne Rocher is a mother, a witch, a traveller and a chocolate-maker with a troubled soul. She has travelled all her life, and is impelled to move on "with the wind", being unable to settle down. She has great powers of empathy, and is able to help people in trouble. She lives for her daughters, but is secretly afraid of other relationships, preferring to flee rather than settle down and face the possibility of rejection. She has spent most of her life on the run from the various embodiments of her fears; "the Black Man", who represents the Church, and "The Kindly Ones", which symbolize her fear of losing her children.
- Anouk: Vianne's eldest daughter, now entering adolescence. She is unhappy and confused, disliking the way her mother has changed. She is bullied at school and hates the fact that her mother is contemplating marriage.
- Rosette is a four-year-old child with a mature sense of humour. She is non-verbal but she can sign and read, and she loves to draw. One doctor diagnosed her with cri-du-chat (a rare genetic disorder). She is very perceptive to magic. She has an imaginary friend called "Bam", which Vianne can sometimes see.
- Zozie de L'Alba is a shadowy figure. She has many personas, but the one she uses to seduce Vianne and Anouk is charming, bohemian and free-spirited. She loves shoes, which she uses to read character (just as Vianne uses chocolate). However, underneath the charm, her ruthlessness and greed emerge.
- Thierry le Tresset is described by Vianne as tall and heavy, with "an open face", "working hands", and "best suited to building walls". He is 51, divorced and rich. He has a very simple, enthusiastic personality - "cheery, determined and impervious to any argument", but he is also patronizing and slightly mysoginistc.
- Madame Poussard: the former owner of the chocolate-shop, who died near Halloween of a stroke.
- Jean-Loup Rimbault: a pupil at Anouk's school who has been held back a year because of a heart condition, which caused him to stay in the hospital for four months. His parents are divorced and he lives with his mother. He likes photography, and his ambition is to see and photograph a ghost. He is Anouk's first real friend at school.
- Roux: a character who first appeared in Chocolat. A traveller, one of the "river-rats", he is still in contact with Vianne through letters, although they haven't seen each other for four years. He is Rosette's father, following a brief liaison with Vianne, but Vianne has never told him this. He lives on a boat, takes occasional work to make a living, and trusts hardly anyone. He is stubborn, honest and direct, but living as he does on the fringes of society, Vianne thinks he can never settle down.
- Nico: one of the people Zozie helps; a young man with weight issues who likes Alice.
- Alice: the florist's daughter. A borderline anorexic, she is very shy and childlike. With Zozie's help, she finds love with Nico.
- Chantal: one of Anouk's schoolmates. A snobbish rich girl who enjoys the advantages of having a powerful father.
- Suzanne: once a friend of Anouk, she abandoned her to be part of the popular crowd, and is now one of Anouk's principal tormentors.
- Madame Luzeron: an old lady, the owner of a fluffy, peach-coloured dog. She buys chocolates regularly from Vianne, but only warms to her when Zozie finds out the secret of her prickly disposition.

== Magical motifs ==
- Dia de los Muertos (Death 1, p. 16) is the Mexican festival of the “Day of the Dead” on November 1.
- The Flayed One (Death 1, p. 16) is a reference to the Aztec god Xipe or Totec, who was in the habit of wearing the skin of a flayed man over his own. At his rather bloody festival, the Aztecs killed all the prisoners that they had taken in war, and these would also be subject to flaying.
- Pan de muerto (Death 1, p. 17) is the ‘bread of the dead’, bread that is formed into the shape of a skull or bones.
- Mictecacihuatl (Death 1, p. 17) was the Queen of the Underworld, who is supposed to keep watch over the bones of the dead. She presides over the festivals of the dead (which have now become the modern Day of the Dead). She is also known as the Lady of the Dead, and it is reputed that she was born, and then sacrificed as an infant.
- “Tezcatlipoca or The Smoking Mirror” (One Jaguar 5, p. 75) is another Aztec god, who had a nagual (i.e. familiar) that was a jaguar, which is probably why this part of the book is called “One Jaguar”.
- Odinists (One Jaguar 5, p. 75) are the members of a New Age movement who do not only worship Odin. According to the Odinist Fellowship, “Odinists value and esteem everything that sustains, promotes, enhances and enriches life”. They celebrate Nature, and feast rather than fast.
- I Ching (One Jaguar 5, p. 76), the famous ‘Book of Changes’, is the oldest of Chinese classic texts. It is a symbol system that is designed to identify order in what seem like chance events. Western society has often regarded it as akin to divination, hence its mention here.
- The Golden Dawn (One Jaguar 5, p. 76) was a magical order of the late 19th and early 20th centuries, which formed a huge influence on twentieth-century western occultism.
- Crowley (One Jaguar 5, p. 76) refers to Aleister Crowley, an influential member of the Golden Dawn.
- Liber Null (One Jaguar 5, p. 76), a book on chaos magic by Peter J. Carroll.
- Necronomicon (One Jaguar 5, p. 76) is a fictitious book that author H.P. Lovecraft referred to in his works.
- Xochipilli (One Jaguar 8, p. 95) is the Aztec god of love, games, beauty, dance, flowers, maize, and song. His name contains the words xochitl ("flower") and pilli ("prince"), and so he is often called "flower prince".
- Two Rabbit (p. 99) is a reference to Ometochtli, the Aztec god of drunkenness, and leader of the four hundred rabbit gods of drunkenness (which was the amusing Aztec way of referring to units of alcohol).
- Theobroma cacao (Two Rabbit 3, p. 120) is the biological name for the chocolate plant and is derived from the Greek expression for ‘food of the gods’.
- Hurakan (Two Rabbit 3, p. 121) is a Mayan god.
- Scrying (Change 7, p. 178) i.e. divining the future using a crystal ball.
- ‘Hubble bubble, toil and…’ (Change 7, p. 179) – the voice in Zozie’s head is referring to the three witches in William Shakespeare’s Macbeth.
- Magi (Advent 5, p. 230), that is to say the ‘Three Wise Men’ from the Bible are believed to have come from Persia (Iran). The word ‘magic’ is derived from ‘magi’. The Magus is also a tarot card.
- Seven Macaw (Advent 12, p. 264) or Vucub Caquix was a Mayan god who would often claim to be the sun or the moon to his worshippers.
- Totem (The Kindly Ones 1, p. 273) – referring to a spirit animal helper as a ‘totem’ is a rather New Age term.
- Saturnalia (The Kindly Ones 1, p. 278) is a Roman festival celebrating the dedication of the temple of Saturn in late December.
- The Oak King and the Holly King (The Kindly Ones 1, p. 278), in Celtic mythology, battle each other at Yule and midsummer to see who will rule over the next half of the year. The Oak King wins at Yule, and the Holly King wins at midsummer.
- Mischief Night (The Kindly Ones 2, p. 283) is observed on different dates throughout the UK just before Halloween, although it has merged into Halloween’s trick or treating.
- The Tower (p. 343) is a Tarot card that also featured heavily in Joanne Harris’s Holy Fools. It is usually read as a blow that forces the subject to re-examine all the pretences that they have been living under, so is quite appropriate for Vianne.
- Santa Muerte (The Tower 7, p. 383), literally the ‘Saint Death’ of Mexican tradition, can be depicted as either male or female.
- Eater of Hearts (The Tower 7, p. 383) is a reference to Ammit, a female figure from Egyptian mythology who was the personification of divine retribution for all the wrongs a person had done in his or her life.
- Coatlicue (Yule 17, p. 447), the Aztec goddess who gave birth to the moon and stars, is the patron of women who die during childbirth. She is the Mother Earth that gives birth to and consumes everything.
- Quetzalcoatl (Yule 17, p. 447) is the most famous Aztec god.

== Themes ==
=== Fear ===
A recurring theme is that of Vianne's fears. There are three; the Wind, the Black Man, and The Kindly Ones (A euphemism used for the Furies, the Greek personification of vengeance). The Kindly Ones are explicitly shown to be those who mean good but actually cause pain; to Vianne these are usually social workers, priests, and doctors. To Zozie, the Kindly Ones are the cost of the lives she leads; the authorities after her for fraud, theft and possibly murder. The Black Man are those who cannot live with the happiness of others, but this is never explained completely and The Black Man could be childish monsters. In this novel, Zozie is the Black Man. The Wind quite simply represents destiny, something which tells Vianne to leave a place even though she never wants to, and this is why she fears it. To Zozie, the wind is the force that drives her to travel, the wanderlust that moves her to travel.

In Chocolat, Vianne confronts her fear of the Black Man, by opposing Reynaud. Here, in this novel, Vianne confronts the Wind - one way or another, by choosing to stay.

=== Magic ===
The magic in this book is a mix between the power of an open mind and a sort of strong intuition or powerful perception that nearly cross into the fantastic. The print of the Magical realism style is ever-present.

=== Free Will versus Fate ===
All the books reflect the combat against a predestined will. Vianne feels the force of the wind, and is driven by it, yet as she struggles to settle.

=== Chocolate ===
Just as in Chocolat, the power of chocolate, as a symbol for love and tolerance, is shown again in The Lollipop Shoes.

== Reception ==
The novel was well received, with Kirkus Reviews describing it as: "a contemporary, razor-edged fairy tale," although The Guardian felt it "lacked the pleasing bittersweetness" of Chocolat.

== Sequel ==
- Peaches for Monsieur le Curé was published in 2012. Its alternative title in the US is Peaches for Father Francis.
