= Educational psychologist =

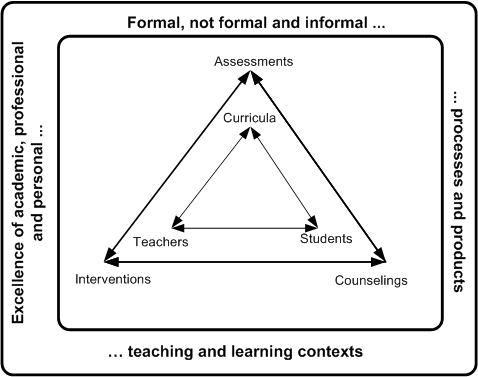
Functions of educational psychologist

An educational psychologist is a psychologist whose differentiating functions may include diagnostic and psycho-educational assessment, psychological counseling in educational communities (students, teachers, parents, and academic authorities), community-type psycho-educational intervention, and mediation, coordination, and referral to other professionals, at all levels of the educational system. Many countries use this term to signify those who provide services to students, their teachers, and families, while other countries use this term to signify academic expertise in teaching Educational Psychology.

== Specific facts ==
Psychology is a well-developed discipline that allows different specializations, which include; clinical and health psychology, work and organizational psychology, educational psychology, etc. What differentiates an educational psychologist from other psychologists or specialists is constituted by an academic triangle whose vertexes are represented by three categories: teachers, students, and curricula (see diagram). The use of plural in these three cases assumes two meanings; the traditional or official one and other more general derived from our information and knowledge society. The plural also indicates that nowadays, we can no longer consider the average student or teacher, or a closed curriculum, but the enormous variety found in our students, teachers, and curricula. The triangle vertexes are connected by two-directional arrows, allowing four-fold typologies instead of the traditional two-way relationships (e.g., teacher-student). In this way, we can find, in different educational contexts, groups of good teachers and students (excellent teaching/learning processes and products), groups of good teachers but bad students, and groups of bad teachers and good students, producing in both cases lower levels of academic achievements. In addition, we can find groups of bad teachers and bad students (school failure). This specific work of an educational psychologist takes place in different contexts: micro-, meso- and macro-systems. Microsystems refer to family contexts, where atmosphere, hidden curriculum, and expectations and behaviors of all family members determine, to a large extent, the educational development of each student. The term mesosystem refers to all variety of contexts found in educational institutions, knowing that different variables such as geographical location, institution marketing or type of teachers and students, etc., can influence the academic results of students. Macrosystem has a much more general and global nature, leading us, for example, to consider the influence that the different societies or countries have on educational final products. One illustrative example of this level can be the analyses carried out on data gathered by the PISA reports. This approach would be the essence of educational psychology versus school psychology for many of U.S. educational researchers and for Division 15 of APA.

== Specific functions ==
There are four specific functions that are the essence of educational psychology. These are evaluation, psychological counseling, communitarian interventions, and referral to other professionals.

Evaluation involves collecting information, in a valid and reliable way, about the three target groups of the triangle diagram (in their respective contexts): teachers, students and curricula. (Not to be confused with curriculum vitae). The most noteworthy function is, without a doubt, formal (rather than informal) assessment. Evaluation is divided into least two main types: diagnosis (dysfunctions detection such as physical, sensory and intellectual impairments, dyslexia, attention-deficit/hyperactivity disorder, pervasive development disorders or autism spectrum disorders) and psycho-educational evaluation (detection of curriculum difficulties, poor school atmosphere or family problems, etc.). Evaluation implies detection, and, thanks to this, Prevention.

A second function, very relevant too, is psychological counseling. This must be directed to students, in their various dimensions (intellectual, obviously, but also their social, affective and professional dimensions), parents, as ‘paraprofessionals’ who may implement programs, selected or developed by educational psychologists, to solve their child/student problems, teachers, to whom will be offered psycho-educational support to face psychological difficulties that may be found when implementing and adapting curricula to diversity shown by students, academic authorities, who will be helped in their decision-making, regarding the teaching (teaching process) and administrative duties (providing necessary support for students with specific educational needs, decisions about promotion to the next level, and so on).

A third function is based on communitarian interventions, with three main facets: corrective, preventative, and optimizing interventions. If disruptive behavior occurs in particular moments and contexts, then a corrective intervention is required. If the aim is school violence reduction, then tertiary preventive intervention programs are needed. If an early diagnosis of learning difficulties is carried out, then psychologist has undertaken secondary prevention. If the aim is to use psycho-educational programs to prevent future school failure, then a primary preventative intervention program is put into practice. The complement to all of these interventions is constituted by a series of optimizing activities, meant for the academic, professional, social, family, and personal improvement of all agents in an educational community, especially learners.

A fourth function, or specific activity, is a referral of those with dysfunctions to other professionals, following a previous diagnostic evaluation, with the aim to coordinate future treatment implementation. This coordination will take place with parents, teachers, and other professionals, promoting collaboration among all educational agents in order to get the fastest and best case resolution. This second triangle represents the essential components of school psychology, for some European researchers or division 16 of APA.

== Academic requirements ==
Recently a specific Doctoral degree (Masters in Scotland) is generally required for the professional preparation of educational psychologists in the UK. In this Doctorate in Educational Psychology, it is essential the main course which prepares educational psychologists for carrying out a diagnostic and psycho-educational assessment, psychological counseling to the educational communities, and all types of communitarian interventions (corrective, preventive and optimizing). Trainees also develop external professional practices (where the specific coordination, evaluation, counseling, and intervention functions will be put into practice) on placement in local authorities, as well as a final thesis. Equally, there are a series of theoretical areas that, due to their relevancy in the teaching/learning contexts, should be included, such as: classroom diversity, drug-dependency prevention, developmental disorders, learning difficulties, new technologies applied to educational contexts, and data analysis and interpretation. In sum, taking into account all of this, perhaps educational psychologists will be able to meet adequately the demands found in different educational institutions.

The following qualifications are required: an undergraduate degree in psychology (or approved postgraduate conversion course which confers the BPS Graduate Basis for Registration) and a BPS accredited Doctorate in Educational Psychology (3 years), or, for Scotland only, an accredited master's degree in Educational Psychology. Whilst teaching experience is relevant, it is no longer an entry requirement. At least one year's full-time experience working with children in educational, childcare, or community settings is required, and for some courses, this may be two years' experience.

To use the term Educational Psychologist in the UK, one will need to be registered with the Health Care Professionals Council (HCPC), which involves completing a course (Doctorate or Masters) approved by the HCPC.

=== In the United States ===
In the most basic sense of standards for education requirements in the United States, an educational psychologist needs a bachelor's degree, followed by a master's degree, and commonly finishing with a PhD or a PsyD in Educational Psychology. Specifically in California, an educational psychologist candidate (commonly referred to as a LEP or Licensed Educational Psychologist) must have a minimum of a master's degree in psychology or a related field in educational psychology. This degree must be coupled with a minimum of three years of experience, including two years as a credential school psychologist and one year of supervised professional experience in an accredited school psychology program. After completing these requirements, a candidate will then take an LEP examination to determine if the applicant will be approved. These requirements are widely accepted by the Board of Behavioral Sciences (BBS) and are considered the common standard. States may have varying standards, but the aforementioned standards are a commonality when working in a school setting. Another route that can be followed is in the research field. It involves many of the same standards without the direct link of being in a school setting. Those with a research setting are typically employed through a university and do research based on their own and others' findings. They may also teach at the university in their respective field.

Handbooks, application forms, and board reviews can be found at various websites:

- http://apadiv15.org/wp-content/uploads/2014/01/Division15Bylaws2012.pdf
- http://www.bbs.ca.gov/pdf/forms/lep/lepapp.pdf
- http://www.caspwebcasts.org/new/index.php?option=com_content&view=article&id=325&Itemid=140

== Job availability/outlook and salary ==
The average salary of an educational psychologist is variable dependent on where the psychologist depends on practicing. In a school setting, the professional can expect to make around $68,000 a year; however, these professionals are commonly school psychologists who have a different background than educational psychologists. An educational psychologist in the research and development field could expect to make around $84,000 per year. Both of these averages could be considered inflated, with another source listing the average income of an educational psychologist at around $57,000 per year. However, the resounding majority seems to sit at the $67,000 per year range, making the previous income average considerably modest. The latest statistics released in 2010 by the Bureau of Labor Statistics place the median annual salary at $72,540 – showing an increase over a four-year period – compared to the median household income of the United States which is currently at $51,000. Educational psychologists make approximately 40% more than the average American, making it an advantageous field of study.

Job outlook in the field of educational psychology is considered in good condition. By national estimates (US) growth in the field ranges from 11 to 15% between 2006 and 2022. A report released in 2006 the rate of growth was listed as 15% from 2006 to 2016, and a separate report released put the growth percentage at a modest 11% from 2012 to 2022. Considering most job outlook growth percentages of the time, educational psychologists had the highest in the psychology field and was also considered the highest amongst all occupations at the time of its release in 2006.

== See also ==
- Child development
- Competency evaluation
- Counseling psychology
- Developmental psychology
- Educational evaluation
- E learning
- Evidence-based education
- Learning curve
- Learning difficulties (disambiguation)
- Learning styles
- Learning theory (disambiguation)
- Learning theory (education)
- Performance evaluation
- Program evaluation
- Psychological testing
- School counselor
- Special education
