= The Strawberry Thief =

2019 novel by Joanne Harris

- Author: Joanne Harris
- Language: English
- Series: Chocolat
- Genre: magic realism
- Set in: France
- Publisher: Orion Books
- Publication date: 2019
- Publication place: UK
- Media type: Print (hardback & paperback)
- Pages: 368 pp
- ISBN: 978-1409170754
- Preceded by: Peaches for Monsieur le Cure
- Followed by: Vianne

The Strawberry Thief is a magical realism novel by UK author Joanne Harris, published by Orion Books in 2019. It is the fourth in a series of interconnected novels that began in 1999 with Chocolat and follows Peaches for Monsieur le Curé. It also exists as an audiobook, narrated by the author.

== Background ==
The author has stated in an interview with The Big Issue that the book was partly inspired by the William Morris Strawberry Thief pattern. She has also stated that part of her decision to write the book came from her daughter's marriage the previous year, saying: "I wanted to write something about how it feels to have a grown-up child, and how parents come to terms with change." On her X account, she shared an image of the tattoo she got "to match" the book (a strawberry plant).

== Plot ==
The story is written in Harris's characteristic multiple-narrative technique, alternating first-person chapters in the voices of Vianne, Rosette, Reynaud, and Narcisse's written confession.

Seven years have passed since the events of Peaches for Monsieur le Curé. After years of travelling, Vianne Rocher has finally settled down in the village of Lansquenet-sous-Tannes. Her daughter Anouk now lives in Paris with her boyfriend, and Vianne runs her chocolate shop with the help of her youngest daughter, Rosette, who has cri-du-chat syndrome and is largely nonverbal. When florist Narcisse dies of old age, gifts a parcel of land to Rosette, and leaves a written confession to Reynaud, the parish priest, the village is thrown into disarray.

Narcisse's daughter, Michèle Montour, arrives to contest Narcisse's gift to Rosette. Reynaud becomes immersed in Narcisse's confession, which is addressed directly to him, in spite of the old man's antipathy. A mysterious tattoo shop owned by the charismatic Morgane Dubois opens in the place of the florist's. Like Vianne, Morgane is a witch, and her designs (which she chooses according to what her customers need, rather than what they ask for) have magical significance. Rosette, a talented artist, is drawn to Morgane, which makes Vianne fear for her safety.

Meanwhile, Reynaud reads Narcisse's confession. As a boy during WW2, Narcisse and his younger sister Mimi are sent to live with a widowed aunt on her farm. Mimi is prone to seizures, and the aunt abuses her for her "misbehaviour". When one of these episodes leads to Mimi's death, the teenage Narcisse kills the aunt and hides her body in a disused well on the property. As an adult, he inherits the farm and plants thousands of trees around the site, leaving a clearing in the shape of a heart to commemorate his beloved sister. This wood is his posthumous gift to Rosette, the "strawberry thief" of the title.

Reading the confession reawakens guilty memories in Reynaud, who blames himself for setting a fire that claimed the lives of two witches when he was a boy, which Narcisse's confession implies. When the confession is stolen by Michèle, who hopes to find some way of disputing her father's gift to Rosette in it, Reynaud scrambles to find it before his own secret is made public.

Vianne, troubled by Morgane's influence in the village and over Rosette, tries to enlist Reynaud's help and later use her own magic to drive Morgane away. Reynaud, tormented by guilt, allows Morgane to tattoo him with a design that he sees as a symbol of his crime. Believing that his secret will be made public, he tries to end his life, but Vianne and Rosette prevent him from doing so. Vianne shows Reynaud the part of Narcisse's confession that absolves him of the crime and details how his priest scapegoated Reynaud to pass down the church's motivation for destroying witches, overshadowing Reynaud's life with a guilt that was never his.

Morgane leaves the village overnight, leaving Rosette her tattoo pen. As Rosette finds her voice, Vianne finally starts to understand that children must be allowed freedom in order to flourish. At the same time, Anouk comes home from Paris, and announces that she and Jean-Loup are married and plan to live abroad. Vianne allows Rosette to tattoo her with a strawberry design, symbolizing "the strawberry runners growing away from the parent plant, hungry for new soil, hungry for change". and finally feels freed of her own fear and insecurity. Reynaud, absolved of his lifelong guilt, prepares to face the future. Rosette remains in the village, but plans to take over Morgane's business and to develop her own kind of magic.

== Themes ==
Like many of Harris' previous novels, outsiders, belonging, grief, change and acceptance, the "emotional resonance" of food, and the importance of family (both adopted and otherwise) play important roles, as does the sadness of seeing children leave home. This theme resonates particularly with Harris, as she wrote the book when her own daughter was preparing to get married and leave the country. Another important theme is that of transformation and change, reflected both in Morgane's art and in Vianne's chocolate making.

=== Scent ===
Harris has stated in interviews that she has a form of synaesthesia that allows her to "smell colours", and that she uses scent as part of her writing process. For The Strawberry Thief, she teamed up with fragrance manufacturer CPL Aromas to create a scent to accompany a passage from the book. The scent, Xocolatl, though never produced commercially, is used in readings and on promotional bookmarks as "scent illustrations" to the chosen passage. Harris described the scent as "bright notes of vanilla and popcorn added to a darker base of amber, chypre, cumin, bitter chocolate, cedar and sandalwood".

=== The William Morris design ===
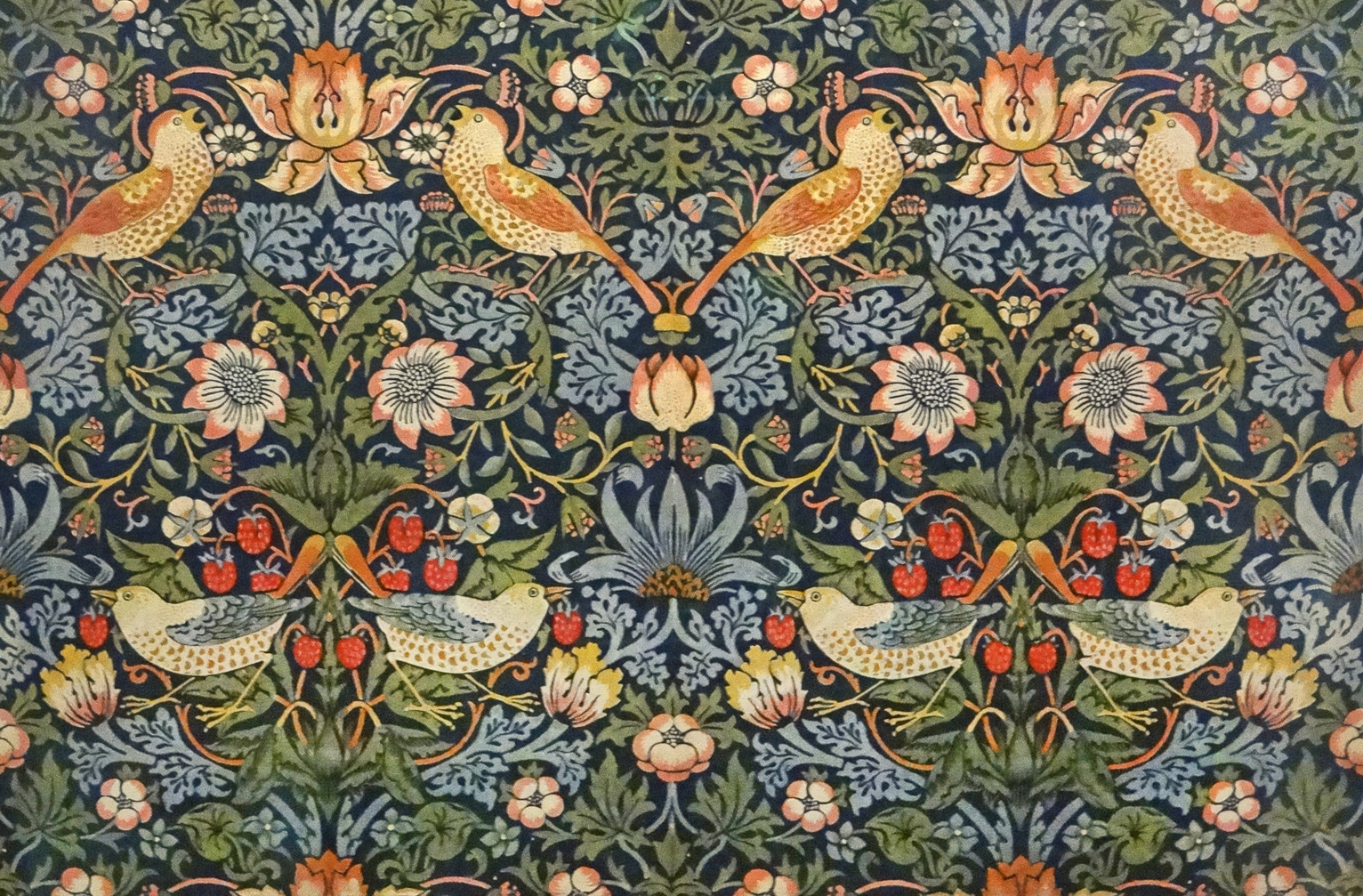
William Morris' "Strawberry Thief" design

One of the visual themes of the book is the William Morris Strawberry Thief textile pattern, which is featured heavily in the novel.

It’s a book about patterns and markings, and the way we mirror each other by our actions and behaviours, as well as the way in which life marks us, and how different attitudes and experiences imprint their patterns onto us. The Morris pattern was a useful starting point to illustrate those ideas.

The Strawberry Thief of the title refers not only to Rosette, but also to this Victorian design, details of which Morgane has tattooed onto her body.

== Reception ==
The book was well received, both in the UK and internationally, and became a Sunday Times bestseller. It was praised by authors James Runcie, Marian Keyes, and Monica Ali. The Deccan Herald praised it for "bringing in all the intricate threads together" and studying human nature and The Guardian praised its evocative atmosphere while recommending tighter pacing. The Irish Times strongly praised its sensuous prose:

There are few writers who are so masterful in their evocation of the senses as Harris; her prose oozes with sounds and smells and tastes that are intoxicating and I've yet to discover more enticing descriptions of food than those offered in her work.
