= Patrick Dorey =

British mathematical physicist

Patrick Dorey FInstP
- Born: Patrick Edward Dorey
- Education: Durham University (PhD)
- Scientific career
- Fields: Mathematical physics
- Workplaces: Durham University
- Thesis: The exact S-matrices of affine Toda field theories (1990)
- Doctoral advisor: Ed Corrigan

Patrick Edward Dorey is a British mathematical physicist. He is a Professor in the Department of Mathematical Sciences at Durham University.

== Education ==
Dorey completed his PhD in 1990 at Durham University, where he was supervised by Ed Corrigan.

== Career ==
Dorey returned to Durham in 1993 after working as a postdoc at Saclay and CERN. His main research interest is conformal and integrable field theories. He was elected a Fellow of the Institute of Physics in 2000.

He has also served as a visiting lecturer at the African Institute of Mathematical Sciences (AIMS) in Cape Town, South Africa, where he remains an associate faculty member.

== Selected publications ==
- Dorey, Patrick; Tateo, Roberto (1996). "Excited states by analytic continuation of TBA equations". Nuclear Physics B. 482 (3): 639–659. arXiv:hep-th/9607167. doi:10.1016/S0550-3213(96)00516-0.
- ———; Tateo, Roberto (1999). "Anharmonic oscillators, the thermodynamic Bethe ansatz and nonlinear integral equations". Journal of Physics A: Mathematical and General. 32 (38): L419–L425. arXiv:hep-th/9812211. doi:10.1088/0305-4470/32/38/102.
- ———; Dunning, Clare; Tateo, Roberto (2001). "Spectral equivalences, Bethe ansatz equations, and reality properties in PT-symmetric quantum mechanics". Journal of Physics A: Mathematical and General. 34 (28): 5679–5704. arXiv:hep-th/0103051. doi:10.1088/0305-4470/34/28/305.
- ———; Dunning, Clare; Tateo, Roberto (2007). "The ODE/IM correspondence". Journal of Physics A: Mathematical and Theoretical. 40 (32): R205–R283. arXiv:hep-th/0703066. doi:10.1088/1751-8113/40/32/R01.
- ———; Mersh, Kieran; Romanczukiewicz, Tomasz; Shnir, Yasha (2011). "Kink-antikink collisions in the φ⁶ model". Physical Review Letters. 107 (9) 091602. arXiv:1101.5951. doi:10.1103/PhysRevLett.107.091602.
