= Learning theory =

Learning theory may refer to:

== Education ==
- Learning theory (education), the process of how humans learn
  - Connectivism
  - Educational philosophies, an academic field that examines the definitions, goals and meaning of education, or of specific educational philosophies.
    - Behaviorism (philosophy of education)
    - Cognitivism (philosophy of education)
    - Constructivism (philosophy of education)
    - Humanism (philosophy of education)
  - E-learning (theory), a cognitive science of effective multimedia e-learning
  - Instructional theory
  - Social cognitive theory
  - Social learning theory

== Computer science ==
- Algorithmic learning theory, a branch of computational learning theory. Sometimes also referred to as algorithmic inductive inference.
- Computational learning theory, a mathematical theory to analyze machine learning algorithms.
- Online machine learning, the process of teaching a machine.
- Statistical learning theory
