= Stephen Davies (writer) =

British children's author

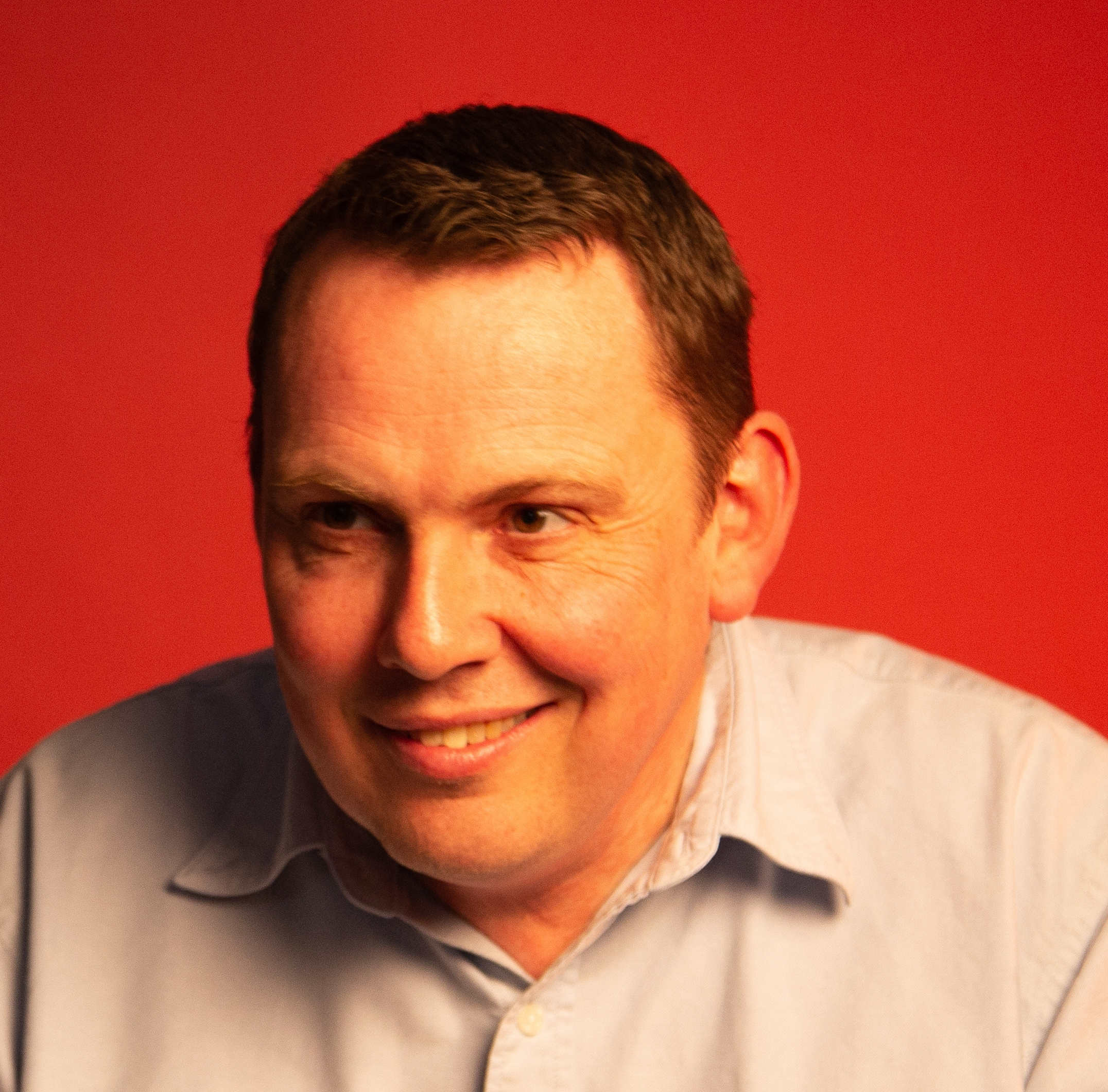
Stephen Davies delivering a Caboodle Classroom workshop in 2022

Stephen Davies (born 28 July 1976) is a British children's author and creative writing tutor. He is best known for his picture books and novels for young readers, many of which are set in West Africa and Egypt, as well as for his tie-in novels to the Netflix animated series Hilda. His works have been translated into over twenty languages.

== Early life and education ==
Davies grew up in Devon, England. From 2001 to 2014 he lived in Burkina Faso, West Africa, an experience that informed much of his early writing. He relocated to London in 2014 and began teaching creative writing in the UK and overseas.

== Books ==
=== Picture books ===
- The Goggle-Eyed Goats (illustrated by Christopher Corr; Andersen Press, 2012)
- Don't Spill the Milk (illustrated by Christopher Corr; Andersen Press, 2013)
- All Aboard for the Bobo Road (illustrated by Christopher Corr; Andersen Press, 2016)
- The Song of Sky and Sand (illustrated by Beidi Guo; Pearson, 2015)
- Sahara Discovery (illustrated by Hatem Aly; Rising Stars, 2017)
- Sahara Survival (illustrated by Hatem Aly; Rising Stars, 2017)

=== Chapter books ===
- Sophie and the Albino Camel (illustrated by Dave Shelton; Andersen Press, 2006)
- Sophie and the Locust Curse (illustrated by Dave Shelton; Andersen Press, 2007)
- Sophie and the Pancake Plot (illustrated by Dave Shelton; Andersen Press, 2008)
- The Hairy Flipflops (illustrated by Steve Stone; Collins Big Cat, 2015)
- Survivor Titanic (cover illustration by Two Dots Studio; Scholastic, 2017)
- The Ancient Egypt Sleepover (cover illustration by Héloïse Mab; Caboodle Books, 2022)
- Mischief on the Moors (illustrated by Marta Dorado; Bloomsbury, 2023)

=== Comic books ===
- Myths, Mummies and Magic in Ancient Egypt (illustrated by Núria Tamarit; Big Picture Press, 2023)
- Norse Myths, Monsters and Viking Voyages (illustrated by Seaerra Miller; Big Picture Press, 2025)
- Myths, Gods and Gladiators in Ancient Rome (illustrated by Laurie Avon; Big Picture Press, 2026)

=== Young adult novels ===
- The Yellowcake Conspiracy (Andersen Press, 2007)
- Hacking Timbuktu (Andersen Press, 2009)
- Outlaw (Andersen Press, 2011)
- Blood & Ink (Andersen Press, 2015)
- Chessboxer (Andersen Press, 2019)
- How to Steal the Rosetta Stone (cover illustration by Nick Taylor; Tegla Books, 2025)

=== Non-fiction ===
- Andy Murray: A Life Story (illustrated by Sarah Papworth; Scholastic, 2022)
- Young Discoverers: Real-life Stories of Extraordinary Discoveries and the Young People Who Unearthed Them (illustrated by Violaine Leroy; Wide-Eyed Editions, 2026)
- Footprints (illustrated by Kalina Muhova; Post Wave, 2026)

=== TV tie-in novels ===
- Hilda and the Hidden People (illustrated by Seaerra Miller; Flying Eye Books, 2017)
- Hilda and the Great Parade (illustrated by Seaerra Miller; Flying Eye Books, 2018)
- Hilda and the Nowhere Space (illustrated by Seaerra Miller; Flying Eye Books, 2019)
- Hilda and the Time Worm (illustrated by Sapo Lendário; Flying Eye Books, 2020)
- Hilda and the Ghost Ship (illustrated by Sapo Lendário; Flying Eye Books, 2020)
- Hilda and the White Woff (illustrated by Sapo Lendário; Flying Eye Books, 2020)
- Hilda and the Laughing Merman (illustrated by Sapo Lendário; Flying Eye Books, 2023)
- Hilda and the Faratok Tree (illustrated by Sapo Lendário; Flying Eye Books, 2023)
- Hilda and the Fairy Village (illustrated by Sapo Lendário; Flying Eye Books, 2023)

== Awards ==
- Africa Geographic 'Travel Writer of the Year', 2003
- Glen Dimplex New Writers Award, Children's Category, 2006
