= Comparative Education =

- Discipline: Education
- Language: English
- Edited by: David Phillips

Publication details
- History: 1964–present
- Publisher: Taylor & Francis
- Frequency: Quarterly
- Impact factor: 1.579 (2017)

Standard abbreviations
- ISO 4: Comp. Educ.

Indexing
- ISSN: 0305-0068 (print); 1360-0486 (web)
- LCCN: 2002238353
- OCLC no.: 962364307

Links
- Journal homepage; Online access; Online archive

Comparative Education is a quarterly peer-reviewed academic journal dedicated to comparative education. It was established in 1964 by Wilfred Douglas Halls (University of Oxford) and Edmund James King (King's College London). It is published by Taylor & Francis (formerly Carfax) and the editor-in-chief is David Phillips (University of Oxford). According to the Journal Citation Reports, the journal has a 2017 impact factor of 1.579, ranking it 95th out of 238 journals in the category "Education & Educational Research".
