= Thom Brooks =

American-British academic

- Born: Thomas Brooks; 14 October 1973 (age 53); New Haven, Connecticut, US
- Title: Professor of Law and Government

Academic background
- Education: Xavier High School
- Alma mater: William Paterson University; Arizona State University; University College Dublin; University of Sheffield
- Thesis: Taking the System Seriously: Themes in Hegel's Philosophy of Right (2004)
- Doctoral advisor: Robert Stern and Leif Wenar

Academic work
- Discipline: Law; Philosophy
- Sub-discipline: Political philosophy; legal philosophy; criminal law; immigration law; United Kingdom constitutional law
- Institutions: Durham University; Newcastle University
- Notable works: Hegel's Political Philosophy (2007); Punishment (2012); Becoming British (2016)
- Notable ideas: Capability approach; Citizenship; Unified theory of punishment

Thomas "Thom" Brooks, (born 14 October 1973) is an American-British political philosopher and legal scholar. He is Professor of Law and Government in Durham Law School at Durham University with associate membership in the Department of Philosophy and School of Government and International Affairs.

== Early life and education ==
Brooks was born 14 October 1973 in New Haven, Connecticut and raised nearby in Guilford, Connecticut. He was educated at Xavier High School, an all-boys private Catholic school in Middletown, Connecticut, United States. From 1992 to 1997, he studied at William Paterson University. He graduated with a Bachelor of Arts (B.A.) degree in 1997, majoring in music and political science. He then studied political science at Arizona State University and graduated with a Master of Arts (MA) degree in 1999. He studied for an MA in philosophy at University College Dublin, graduating in 2000 with first class honours. From 2001, he undertook postgraduate research in philosophy at the University of Sheffield under the supervision of Robert Stern and Leif Wenar. He completed his Doctor of Philosophy (PhD) degree in 2004. His doctoral thesis was titled "Taking the System Seriously: Themes in Hegel's Philosophy of Right".

== Academic career ==
Brooks started his academic career at Newcastle University. He was a lecturer in political thought from 2004 to 2007. From 2004 to 2005, he was also a visiting fellow at the Centre for Ethics, Philosophy and Public Affairs, University of St Andrews. In 2007, he was promoted to reader in political and legal philosophy. From 2010 to 2011, he was an academic visitor to the Faculty of Philosophy, University of Oxford and received a visiting fellowship to St John's College, Oxford in 2012. His "Publishing Guide for Graduate Students" aims to fill the gap in advice that graduate students may face when attempting to become published in humanities and social sciences.

In 2012, Brooks joined the Durham Law School, Durham University, as a reader in law, and its Philosophy Department as an associate member. He was appointed Professor of Law and Government in 2014. Between 2014 and 2016, he served as Director of the Centre for Criminal Law and Criminal Justice at Durham University. In 2015, he was a visiting fellow to Yale Law School, Yale University.

On 1 August 2016, was appointed head of the Durham Law School and the school's inaugural Dean. As Dean, Brooks introduced Chinese law into the LLB and LLM curriculum alongside a new annual Chinese law summer school - the first ever in the UK and first time in English outside Asia. He completed his term in December 2021. Brooks was the president of the Society of Legal Scholars from 2020-21.

In February 2025, he was announced as the next principal of Collingwood College, Durham. He took up the post in September 2025.

=== Research and contributions ===
In 2013, Brooks wrote a report analysing the United Kingdom's new citizenship test. His report was titled "The 'Life in the United Kingdom test': Is It Unfit for Purpose?". He was highly critical of the test, concluding that it was "unfit for purpose". He criticised the test's focus on "British culture and history at the expense of practical knowledge".

Brooks publishes widely on criminal justice and sentencing. His "unified theory of punishment" is noted as one of the top 100 Big Ideas for the Future in a report by RCUK. Brooks has written three books, edited two reports and 23 collections, published over 130 articles and 150 columns. His research on capital punishment is quoted and cited by the Connecticut Supreme Court lead decision in its case of State v. Santiago (Santiago II), 318 Conn. 1, 105 (2015) abolishing capital punishment in Connecticut. In 2015, the Electoral Commission quotes Brooks in support of its proposed changes to the EU Referendum. They proposed changing the ballot choices to "Remain" and "Leave" and this was later accepted by the UK Government.

Brooks appears frequently on media, including television, radio and newspapers often discussing migration policy. He has been interviewed by Andrew Marr.

Brooks is founding Editor of the Journal of Moral Philosophy which he led from 2003-2012, launched while he was a PhD student. He is also an Advisory Editor of the University of Bologna Law Review, a general student-edited law journal published by the Department of Legal Studies of the University of Bologna.

== Personal life ==
Brooks has been a citizen of the United States since birth and became a citizen of the United Kingdom in 2011, becoming a dual citizenship holder. His report is cited several times in Parliamentary debates. Brooks has been called "the UK's leading expert on the citizenship test".

Brooks is a member of the British Labour Party and the UNISON trade union. He has written about his view of the Labour Party's policy on immigration, including making a range of proposals on the topic. He has made past comments supporting New Labour and Sedgefield's Tony Blair, and supported Liz Kendall in the 2015 Labour leadership contest. He has championed party unity over factionalism. Brooks is a vocal supporter of Labour Leader Keir Starmer. In 2022, Brooks published a Fabian Society pamphlet New Arrivals: A Fair Immigration System for Labour that presented a new model for a Labour-led post-Brexit points-based system. His report won the Fabian Society's Jenny Jeger Prize in 2022.

Brooks writes columns for The Daily Telegraph, The Guardian, The Independent, LabourList, The Times and others often on immigration topics.

== Honours ==
In 2009, Brooks was elected a Fellow of the Academy of Social Sciences (FAcSS). In 2010, he was elected a Fellow of the Royal Historical Society (FRHistS). In 2012, Brooks was elected a Fellow of the Royal Society of Arts (FRSA). In 2014, he was elected a Fellow of the Higher Education Academy (FHEA). In 2018, he became an Academic Bencher of the Honourable Society of Inner Temple. In 2021, he was elected member of the Academia Europaea.

== Selected works ==
- Brooks, Thom, ed. (2005). Rousseau and Law. Aldershot: Ashgate. ISBN 9780754624417.
- Brooks, Thom; Freyenhagen, Fabian, eds. (2005). The Legacy of John Rawls. London: Continuum. ISBN 978-0826478436.
- Brooks, Thom (2007). Hegel's Political Philosophy: A Systematic Reading of the Philosophy of Right (1st ed.). Edinburgh: Edinburgh University Press. ISBN 978-0748625741.
- Brooks, Thom, ed. (2008). The Global Justice Reader. Oxford: Blackwell. ISBN 978-1405169653.
- Brooks, Thom, ed. (2009). The Right to a Fair Trial. Aldershot: Ashgate. ISBN 9780754628088.
- Brooks, Thom, ed. (2010). New Waves in Ethics. Basingstoke: Palgrave Macmillan. ISBN 978-0230232754.
- Brooks, Thom, ed. (2011). Ethics and Moral Philosophy. Leiden: Brill. ISBN 978-9004203426.
- Brooks, Thom, ed. (2012). Hegel's Philosophy of Right. Chichester, West Sussex: Wiley-Blackwell. ISBN 978-1405188135.
- Brooks, Thom (2012). Punishment. London: Routledge. ISBN 978-0415431811.
- Brooks, Thom (2013). Hegel's Political Philosophy: A Systematic Reading of the Philosophy of Right (2nd ed.). Edinburgh: Edinburgh University Press. ISBN 978-0748645107.
- Brooks, Thom (2013). The 'Life in the United Kingdom' Citizenship Test: Is It Unfit for Purpose? (PDF) (Report). Durham: Durham University.
- Brooks, Thom, ed. (2013). Just War Theory. Leiden: Brill. ISBN 9789004228504.
- Brooks, Thom, ed. (2014). Ethical Citizenship: British Idealism and the Politics of Recognition. Basingstoke: Palgrave Macmillan. ISBN 978-1137329950.
- Brooks, Thom, ed. (2014). Alcohol and Public Policy. London: Routledge. ISBN 978-0415730242.
- Brooks, Thom, ed. (2014). New Waves in Global Justice. Basingstoke: Palgrave Macmillan. ISBN 9781137286383.
- Brooks, Thom, ed. (2014). Sentencing. Aldershot: Ashgate. ISBN 9789004228504.
- Brooks, Thom (2015). A Practical Guide to Living in the United Kingdom: A Report (Report). Durham: Durham University. SSRN 2622908.
- Brooks, Thom; Nussbaum, Martha C., eds. (2015). Rawls's Political Liberalism. New York, NY: Columbia University Press. ISBN 978-0231149709.
- Brooks, Thom, ed. (2015). Current Controversies in Political Philosophy. London: Routledge. ISBN 978-0415517522.
- Brooks, Thom (2016). Becoming British: UK Citizenship Examined. London: Biteback Publishing. ISBN 978-1849549769.
- Brooks, Thom; Stein, Sebastian, eds. (2017). Hegel's Political Philosophy: On the Normative Significance of Method and System. New York, NY: Oxford University Press. ISBN 9780198778165.
- Brooks, Thom, ed. (2019). Plato's The Republic. New Delhi: South Asia Press. ISBN 9788193610497.
- Brooks, Thom, ed. (2020). The Oxford Handbook of Global Justice. Oxford: Oxford University Press. ISBN 9780198714354.
- Brooks, Thom (2020). Climate Change Ethics for an Endangered World. London: Routledge. ISBN 9780367524319.
- Brooks, Thom (2021). Punishment: A Critical Introduction, 2nd edition. London: Routledge. ISBN 9781138694668.
- Brooks, Thom, ed. (2022). Political Emotions: Towards a Decent Public Sphere. Basingstoke: Palgrave Macmillan.
- Brooks, Thom (2022). The Trust Factor: Essays on he Current Crisis and Hope for the Future. London: Methuen. ISBN 9780413778482.
- Brooks, Thom (2022). New Arrivals: A Fair Immigration Plan for Labour. London: [Fabian Society]. ISBN 9780716306580.
- Brooks, Thom (2022). Reforming the UK's Citizenship Test: Building Bridges, Not Barriers. Bristol: Bristol University Press. ISBN 9781529218527.
- Brooks, Thom (2025), "Hegel's Social and Political Philosophy", in Zalta, Edward N.; Nodelman, Uri (eds.), The Stanford Encyclopedia of Philosophy (Summer 2025 ed.), Metaphysics Research Lab, Stanford University
