= Ed Corrigan =

British mathematician, theoretical physicist and professor

- Born: Francis Edward Corrigan; 10 August 1946 (age 80); Birkenhead, England, UK
- Education: University of Cambridge
- Scientific career
- Fields: Theoretical physics
- Workplaces: University of Durham; University of York
- Thesis: Amplitudes and Vertices in Dual Models (1972)
- Doctoral advisor: Ian T. Drummond; David Olive
- Doctoral students: Patrick Dorey
- Website: https://www.york.ac.uk/maths/staff/ed-corrigan/

Francis Edward Corrigan FRS (born 10 August 1946, in Birkenhead) is a British mathematician and theoretical physicist. He is professor at the University of York.

== Early life and education ==
Corrigan attended St Bede's College, Manchester and earned a BA (1968) and PhD (1972) at the University of Cambridge.

== Career ==
He was Addison Wheeler Fellow in the Department of Mathematical Sciences Durham University 1972–74, CERN Fellow 1974–75, and returned to work at Durham from 1976 to 1999 (including as Head of Department 1996–98). He then moved to the University of York where he was Head of Department of Mathematics 1999–2004, 2005–2007 and 2011–2015. He served as Principal of Collingwood College, Durham, from 2008 to 2011.
