= Learning difficulties =

Learning difficulties may refer to:

- Learning disability, difficulty learning in a typical manner, often divided into:
1. Dyslexia, difficulty in learning to read fluently
2. Dyscalculia, difficulty in learning or comprehending arithmetic
- Intellectual disability, significantly impaired cognitive functioning and adaptive deficits appearing before adulthood

Note that the term learning disability means "difficulty learning in a typical manner" in North America but refers specifically to "intellectual disability" in the United Kingdom. For more information, see the section on History of the terminology (United Kingdom).
