= Elena Miller =

Soviet spy

Elena Miller, originally known as Yelena Borisovna Olshanskaya, is a Russian who, as alleged by the Canadian Security Intelligence Service (CSIS), lived in Canada as a spy, using the name of a dead child as a cover. Olshanskaya later lost the right to immigrate back to Canada to live with her second husband, Canadian Peter Miller.

== Career ==
In the early 1990s, Yelena Olshanskaya came to live in Canada under the alias Laurie Catherine Mary Lambert (nee Brodie). Her husband Dmitriy used the alias Ian Mackenzie Lambert.

On 27 May 1996, CBC television correspondent Neil MacDonald reported the arrest of Ian and Laurie Lambert, a married couple living in a Toronto apartment, as Russian spies. In the early 1990s, the couple had come separately to Canada under Russian names Yelena Borisovna Olshanskaya and Dmitriy Olshansky. According to CSIS, the real Laurie Brodie was born on 8 September 1963, in Quebec, and had died in Toronto at age two. The real Ian Mackenzie Lambert was a child from Ontario who had died age three months on 17 February 1966. Canadian intelligence reported that they worked for the Russian foreign intelligence service. The wife had worked for an insurance company in Toronto; the husband worked at a Blacks photography plant.

The couple divorced soon after they were arrested, and were deported from Canada in June 1996. Dmitriy Olshansky then married his girlfriend; Yelena married her boyfriend, a UK-born Canadian doctor named Peter Miller, in a ceremony attended by her ex-husband.

In 1998, Peter Miller sponsored Elena's application for permanent residence in Canada. Miller claimed that she posed no threat to Canada because she had quit Russian intelligence in October 1996. She also refused to discuss her spying activity in Canada because of a non-disclosure agreement. The suit failed in federal courts due to her security status.

On 24 July 2006, in an appeal decision, Canada's federal court chief, Justice Allan Lutfy, upheld the decision of Public Safety Minister Anne McLellan to deny Miller's immigration request. As a result, Miller could not return to Canada to live with her Canadian husband. The Millers subsequently settled in Switzerland.

In October 2006, Elena Miller sued Citizenship and Immigration Canada for permission to immigrate to Canada, and damages resulting from negligence and delays in processing her immigration request. On 30 November 2006, Canadian Federal Court Justice James Hugessen dismissed the suit, stating that Canadian officials had acted appropriately in the interests of the nation, and had done "the best they could to assess a claim by an unmasked Russian spy to an exemption and special treatment by the country whose hospitality she so grossly abused."

== See also ==
- Donald Heathfield and Tracey Lee Ann Foley Two Russians in Canada under the Illegals Program
- Maria Butina
- Anna Chapman
- Donald Heathfield
- Jack Barsky
- Sleeper agent
- Resident spy
- Salt (2010 film)
- The Americans
