= The Illegals =

2025 Nonfiction book by Shaun Walker

The Illegals: Russia's Most Audacious Spies and Their Century-Long Mission to Infiltrate the West
- 2025 book jacket
- Author: Shaun Walker
- Audio read by: Paul Thornley
- Language: English
- Subject: Soviet espionage, Russian espionage, International relations
- Genre: Nonfiction, History
- Set in: Soviet Union, Russia, Europe, and the United States
- Published: April 15, 2025
- Publisher: Alfred A. Knopf
- Publication place: United States
- Pages: 448
- ISBN: 9780593319680
- OCLC: 1464027020
- Website: Official website

The Illegals: Russia's Most Audacious Spies and Their Century-Long Mission to Infiltrate the West is a nonfiction account of a long running program of infiltration by, first, the Soviet Union, and then the Russian Federation, all the way up to the invasion of Ukraine. This book was written by Shaun Walker and published by Alfred A. Knopf on April 15, 2025.

== Synopsis ==
Below, reviews of this work tell the history, methods, and cultural impacts of the illegals program according to this book.

=== Prelude ===
In 1902, Leon Trotsky and Vladimir Lenin were living in exile in London. They subsequently became leaders of the Russian Revolution. While in London they were using fake names, Lev Bronstein and Vladimir Ulyanov. They were living as fugitives and were in hiding from the Tzar’s secret police, known as Okhrana in English. Meanwhile, the man who would become Joseph Stalin was using the alias "Koba." To survive, these revolutionaries, as they were characterized by the Tsar, used spy craft. They wrote messages in invisible ink, kept their groups small and secret, and wore disguises. Lenin even posed as a German doctor. When they took power in 1922 they turned these underground tactics into a professional spy network, sending secret agents abroad worldwide. These same methods led to Trotsky’s death. While in exile in Mexico, Trotsky was killed by a Soviet assassin posing as a businessman.

=== The illegals ===
These agents lived ordinary lives without diplomatic protection, unlike conventional spies. This system was inherited from the Bolsheviks' pre-revolution tactics of operating secretly to avoid the Tsar's police. In the early Soviet years, when many countries wouldn't recognize the USSR, there were no embassies for traditional spies to use. This led to the era of the "great illegals," who used deception—posing as aristocrats, merchants, or students—to spy on capitalist enemies. However, this entire network was destroyed by Stalin's purges in the 1930s. Stalin was deeply suspicious of these agents, even though they were masters of deception for the Soviet cause, and he often ignored their valuable intelligence.

=== WWII and Cold War ===
During World War II, which was referred to as "The Great Patriotic War" in the USSR, the illegals program was revived and its participants became celebrated heroes, credited with assassinating high-ranking Nazi officials. In the Cold War, the KGB relaunched the program, recruiting agents with excellent language skills for deep cover, primarily in the United States. These spies were meticulously trained and often took the identity of a dead infant. Since posing as a native American was extremely difficult, even in a nation of immigrants, they were often given a third nationality such as German or Canadian, as part of their cover story. This was a life of extreme strain and isolation, sometimes lasting decades, cut off from family and home. Spies were paired up and strictly forbidden from ever speaking Russian to each other, even in private. Many of these agents were so called "sleepers," because they had no active spying role but were simply ordered to wait in place until they received an urgent activation order.

=== Sources and methods ===
Soviet "illegals" used typical spy methods, or "tradecraft," like those found in a spy novel. They used chalk marks on public objects, such as a white mark on a lamppost to signal they had information ready, or a blue mark on a bench to show the handler was ready to receive it. To confirm their identity at a meeting, they used a stiff, pre-arranged recognition phrase. For example, a spy in New York City was asked, "Have you read any books by Elie Wiesel lately?" and had to reply, "No, I have been reading Hemingway." This exchange was meant to appear awkward and artificial.

=== Cultural impacts ===
This Bolshevik / Soviet program has inspired creations such as Marvel films' Natasha Romanof a.k.a the Black Widow and the TV series The Americans. The main inspiration for The Americans TV series was the 2010 capture and story of a Russian sleeper agent ring, that included Donald Heathfield and Tracey Foley, which were aliases for, respectively, Andrey Bezrukov and Elena Vavilova. Their two sons grew up in Massachusetts having no idea their parents were Russian until "the FBI kicked in the door." They were part of a ring that included the "glamorous" Anna Chapman. According to Joseph Finder of The New York Times, "What's more fascinating is how the mythology of illegals took on a cultural life of its own, separate from operational realities. The Soviet TV series "Seventeen Moments of Spring," featuring a fictional Russian spy who, undercover as "Max Otto von Stierlitz," infiltrated Nazi leadership, became the most watched show in Soviet history."

== See also ==
- Illegals Program
- The Spy in the Archive by Gordon Corera
- Russians Among Us by Gordon Corera
- The Americans
