= Illegal agent =

Illegal agent may refer to:

- Non-official cover, an espionage operative without official government links who assume covert roles
- Illegals Program, a specific group of Russian espionage operatives, arrested in the United States in 2010
