= Project on National Security Reform =

U.S. nonprofit advocating for governmental reform (2006–2012)

The Project on National Security Reform (PNSR) was a nonpartisan nonprofit mandated by the United States Congress to recommend improvements to the U.S. national security system. Advocates of reform of the U.S. national security system contend that the fundamental components of the system, which includes the National Security Council, the Department of Defense, the Department of State, the Central Intelligence Agency, among others, were largely designed via the National Security Act of 1947 in order to combat the Soviet Union. Today's global security environment, largely due to globalization, is much more complex than it was during the Cold War. PNSR argues that government structures need to be more agile and efficient in order to combat new threats such as terrorism, transnational crime, and rogue states.

PNSR issued their final report in December 2008 entitled "Forging a New Shield." Over 300 national security experts from think tanks, universities, federal agencies, law firms and corporations contributed to the report. PNSR is currently transforming into an advocacy organization for comprehensive reform of the national security system.

PNSR ended operations in 2012.

== History ==
Founded in 2006, the Project on National Security Reform is run by James R. Locher III, a former Assistant Secretary of Defense for Special Operations and Low Intensity Conflict. Locher also directed the Congressional staff effort that led to the Goldwater-Nichols Act of 1986, which reworked the command structure of the United States Military. Former Director of National Intelligence Dennis Blair served as PNSR's Deputy Executive Director from 2006 until January 2009.

== Guiding Coalition ==
PNSR is led by a 21-member bipartisan Guiding Coalition that includes former senior federal officials with extensive national security experience. The bipartisan group sets the strategic direction for the Project, examines progress, discusses objectives, and reviews findings and recommendations resulting from PNSR research and analysis. Current and former members of PNSR's Guiding Coalition include:

- David Abshire (former member) – President and CEO, Center for the Study of the Presidency
- Norman Augustine – retired chairman and CEO, Lockheed Martin Corporation
- Joel Bagnal – former Deputy Assistant to President George W. Bush for Homeland Security
- Robert Blackwill Counselor, Council on Foreign Relations
- Adm. Dennis C. Blair (former member) – former Commander in Chief, U.S. Pacific Command. Former Director of National Intelligence.
- Gen. Charles G. Boyd, USAF – President and CEO, Business Executives for National Security
- Ashton Carter (former member) – Ford Foundation Professor of Science and International Affairs. JFK School of Government, Harvard University. Former Under Secretary of Defense for Acquisition, Technology and Logistics
- Lt. Gen. Daniel Christman – Senior Vice President for International Affairs, U.S. Chamber of Commerce
- Wesley Clark – former United States Army general and Supreme Allied Commander Europe
- Ruth A. David – President and CEO, Analytic Services Inc.
- Michele Flournoy (former member) – former Under Secretary of Defense for Policy
- Leon Fuerth – The Project on Forward Engagement, The George Washington University, former National Security Advisor to former Vice President Al Gore
- Edmund Giambastiani – former United States Navy admiral and Vice Chairman of the Joint Chiefs of Staff
- Newt Gingrich – former Speaker of the United States House of Representatives
- James L. Jones – former United States Marine Corps general and Commandant of the Marine Corps; current National Security Advisor under Barack Obama
- James R. Locher III – former Assistant Secretary of Defense for Special Operations and Low Intensity Conflict
- James Loy – former Deputy Secretary of Homeland Security
- Jessica Mathews – President, Carnegie Endowment for International Peace
- John E. McLaughlin – former deputy director, Central Intelligence Agency
- Joseph Nye – University Distinguished Service Professor, John F. Kennedy School of Government, Harvard University
- Carlos Pascual – Vice-president and Director, Foreign Policy Studies, Brookings Institution
- Thomas R. Pickering – former United States Ambassador to the United Nations
- Brent Scowcroft, former United States Air Force general and National Security Advisor under Gerald Ford and George H. W. Bush
- Jeffrey H. Smith – partner, Arnold & Porter
- James Steinberg (former member) – former dean of the Lyndon B. Johnson School of Public Affairs at the University of Texas at Austin, current Deputy Secretary of State
- Kenneth R. Weinstein – CEO, Hudson Institute

== Connections to the Obama Administration ==
Key members of PNSR's Guiding Coalition have been appointed by, or linked in the press to, the incoming Obama administration, including General James L. Jones, Admiral Dennis C. Blair, James Steinberg, Michele Flournoy, Ashton Carter, Joseph Nye and Carlos Pascual.

== Recommendations ==
The Project on National Security Reform divided their recommendations to the United States Congress, President Barack Obama, and U.S. government departments and agencies into seven "themes" with 28 specific recommendations. According to PNSR's Final Report, "members of the Guiding Coalition agreed with the general thrust of the integrated set of recommendations and not necessarily every recommendation as expressed."
