= The Spy in the Archive =

2026 Nonfiction book by Gordon Corera

- 2025 Book jacket
- Author: Gordon Corera
- Audio read by: Gordon Corera
- Subject: Espionage, Spy craft
- Genre: Biographies
- Set in: Soviet Union and Britain
- Published: 2025, 2026
- Publisher: William Collins, London, Pegasus Books
- Publication place: United Kingdom
- Media type: Print, E-book, Audio
- Pages: 323 pages, 8 unnumbered pages of plates
- ISBN: 9780008644796 9780008644802
- OCLC: 1523443398
- Preceded by: Operation Columba

The Spy in the Archive: How One Man Tried to Kill the KGB is a nonfiction account of a former Soviet Union KGB librarian, Vasili Mitrokhin, who smuggled highly valued secret archives (of information) to the Western democracies. He later defected the United Kingdom in 1992 with the help of the British MI6. The book was written by Gordon Corera and published by Pegasus Books in January 2026. It was previously published by William Collins, London, in 2025.

== See also ==
- The Illegals by Shaun Walker
- Russians Among Us by Gordon Corera
