= Boris Kuznetsov (lawyer) =

Russian lawyer

Boris Avramovich Kuznetsov (Кузнецов, Борис Аврамович, born 1944) is a prominent Russian lawyer who has acted in many notable criminal and human rights cases, and who has been persecuted by the Russian authorities. He left Russia in 2007 and in February 2008 was granted asylum in the US. His absence caused the case against him to be suspended in April. It was restarted in July, before again being abandoned in May 2009. He has sought redress against the Russian authorities in the European Court of Human Rights.

== Biography ==
Kuznetsov represented the families of the 118 sailors killed in the Kursk nuclear submarine; relatives of murdered journalist Anna Politkovskaya; the scientist Igor Sutyagin, who was jailed on espionage charges; NGO director Manana Aslamazyan; and many others. In 1990 Kuznetsov also represented KGB General Oleg Kalugin in his lawsuit against USSR president Mikhail Gorbachev, who had stripped Kalugin of awards and the rank of general for exposing of KGB operations.

In the course of defending his client, Federation Council member Levon Chakhmakhchyan, he submitted a document to the Russian Constitutional Court about the Russian Federal Security Service's illegal wiretaps of Chakhmakhchyan's phone conversations. Based on that, Kuznetsov was prosecuted for allegedly revealing state top secrets. The criminal case against Kuznetsov was initiated on the personal request of Federal Security Service director Nikolai Patrushev.

Kuznetsov responded: "I was simply carrying out my duty.... I found documents that talked about wiretapping not just a common citizen, but a member of the Federation Council. I did as much as I could to make sure that fact was exposed and proven. And it was precisely that memorandum, marked 'secret,' that contained evidence that [security services] knew who they were eavesdropping on. And I sent it not to [Israel's] Mossad [intelligence agency] or the CIA, but to the Constitutional Court."

According to Kuznetsov, he was wrongly accused for angering the FSB: "I think there was an element of revenge in this for the book I published two years ago, but most probably it was done to exclude me from several cases, such as the case of [Educated Media Foundation chief] Manana Aslamazyan," Kuznetsov said. "I also represent the interests of [Anna] Politkovskaya's family; I don't rule out that it had to do with the case of Vladimir Khutsishvili, accused of killing [former Rosbiznesbank chief] Ivan Kivelidi, because it's perfectly plain that security services were involved in those cases in one way or another."

Yulia Latynina criticized Kuznetsov for defending criminals. She also stated that his former client, scientist Igor Sutyagin, could have passed information to a front company of a spy agency without knowing the final recipient. Kuznetsov replied that Sutyagin had not passed secrets and that Latynina had denigrated those who opposed abuses by the Russian secret service FSB.

== Books ==
Kuznetsov has published a book about the sinking of the Russian nuclear submarine Kursk, alleging that the Russian authorities covered up the facts of the disaster, and is the author of six other books.

== Sources ==
- Kuznetsov in American Russian Law Institute directory
- Russia: Prominent Lawyer Flees Country, Fearing Prosecution, by RFE/RL
- US lawyers hired as spin doctors for Russian mob
- How Inkobank duped American investors, Russia Bulletin
- Manana Aslamazyan case, publication by the Union of Councils for Jews in the Former Soviet Union
