= Russians Among Us =

2020 nonfiction espionage book

- Author: Gordon Corera
- Language: English
- Genre: non-fiction
- Publisher: HarperCollins
- Publication date: February 18, 2020
- Publication place: United States
- Pages: 448
- ISBN: 978-0-06-288941-6

Russians Among Us: Sleeper Cells, Ghost Stories, and the Hunt for Putin's Spies is a 2020 nonfiction book by Gordon Corera about the Russian Illegals Program. It discusses the long-term infiltration and espionage efforts by the Russian government and the individual spies, as well as the American efforts to apprehend and convict the spies.

== See also ==
- Aleksandr Poteyev
