= Cyberspies =

Non-fiction espionage book

Cyberspies: The Secret History of Surveillance, Hacking, and Digital Espionage
- Author: Gordon Corera
- Language: English
- Genre: non-fiction
- Publisher: Pegasus Publications
- Publication date: 2015
- Publication place: United States
- Pages: 448
- ISBN: 978-1-68177-154-0

Intercept: The Secret History of Computers and Spies (published as Cyberspies: The Secret History of Surveillance, Hacking, and Digital Espionage in the United States) is a 2015 non-fiction book by the historian and BBC journalist Gordon Corera about the history of digital covert operations. It examines the history of digital surveillance and code-breaking, and how it has transformed into modern cyberwarfare.

== Reception ==
The book was very positively received. Richard Norton-Taylor writing in The Guardian felt that "If you are looking for a clear and comprehensive guide to how communications have been intercepted, from cable-cutting in the First World War to bulk data collection exposed by Ed Snowden, this is it ... A most readable account of how computers and the internet have transformed spying". Ed Vulliamy in The Observer noted that the book "takes us through the labyrinth of cyber-espionage ... It concerns a psychosis of control, whereby the digitisation of spying infests every cranny of our lives".

In The Sunday Times Stephen Dorril described Cyberspies as "Riveting ... Making use of excellent sources...[Corera] has produced a highly relevant read that addresses the key debate in intelligence gathering - the balance between privacy and security". Alan Judd writing in The Spectator felt that Correa "explores the evolution of computers from what used to be called signals intelligence to their transforming role in today's intelligence world. The result is an informative, balanced and revealing survey of the field in which, I suspect, most experts will find something new" and The Economist wrote of the book's conclusion that "The true golden age of spying and surveillance - whether carried out by states or, increasingly, by companies - is now".
