= Shaun Walker (journalist) =

British journalist

Shaun Walker (born 1981/1982) is a British journalist and author, noted primarily for his writing on Ukraine and Russia for British newspaper The Guardian. Walker was shortlisted for the 2024 UK Press Awards.

== Early life and education ==
Walker visited Russia for the first time as an 18-year-old, in 2000, working as an English teacher, and then travelling around the country. He then returned home to the UK, where he studied Russian and Soviet history at Oxford University. After completing his studies, Walker returned to Moscow at the end of 2003, working for an NGO for a year, before taking up journalism.

== Career ==
Walker worked for British newspaper The Independent from 2007, and was its Moscow correspondent until 2013. From 2014, working for The Guardian, primarily as its Ukraine and Russia correspondent, he has extensively covered the war in Donbas. As of 2018 Walker was living in Budapest, Hungary. From 2019, he has been The Guardian's central and eastern Europe correspondent.

Walker is the author of the non-fiction books Odessa Dreams: The Dark Heart of Ukraine's Online Marriage Industry (2014) and The Long Hangover: Putin's New Russia and the Ghosts of the Past (2018). The Illegals: Russia's Most Audacious Spies and Their Century-Long Mission to Infiltrate the West (2025) is about the agents who lived apparently normal lives in the west as part of Soviet espionage programmes.

== Political views ==
Walker has been criticised for some of his pro-Russian writings prior to 2022, including a 2014 article for The Guardian entitled "I can't stop dreaming about Vladimir Putin", and his positive comments on Russia at the time of the 2018 World Cup. He has also been criticized for not adequately considering the perspective of Russia and Putin in his reporting.

== Publications ==
- Odessa Dreams: The Dark Heart of Ukraine's Online Marriage Industry (2014)
- The Long Hangover: Putin's New Russia and the Ghosts of the Past (2018)
- The Illegals: Russia's Most Audacious Spies and Their Century-Long Mission to Infiltrate the West (2025)

== See also ==
- Oliver Bullough
- Luke Harding
- Peter Hitchens
- Tim Judah
- Edward Lucas
- Sarah Rainsford
