= Donald Heathfield and Tracey Foley =

Russian spies in the US (born 1960 and 1962)

Andrei Bezrukov
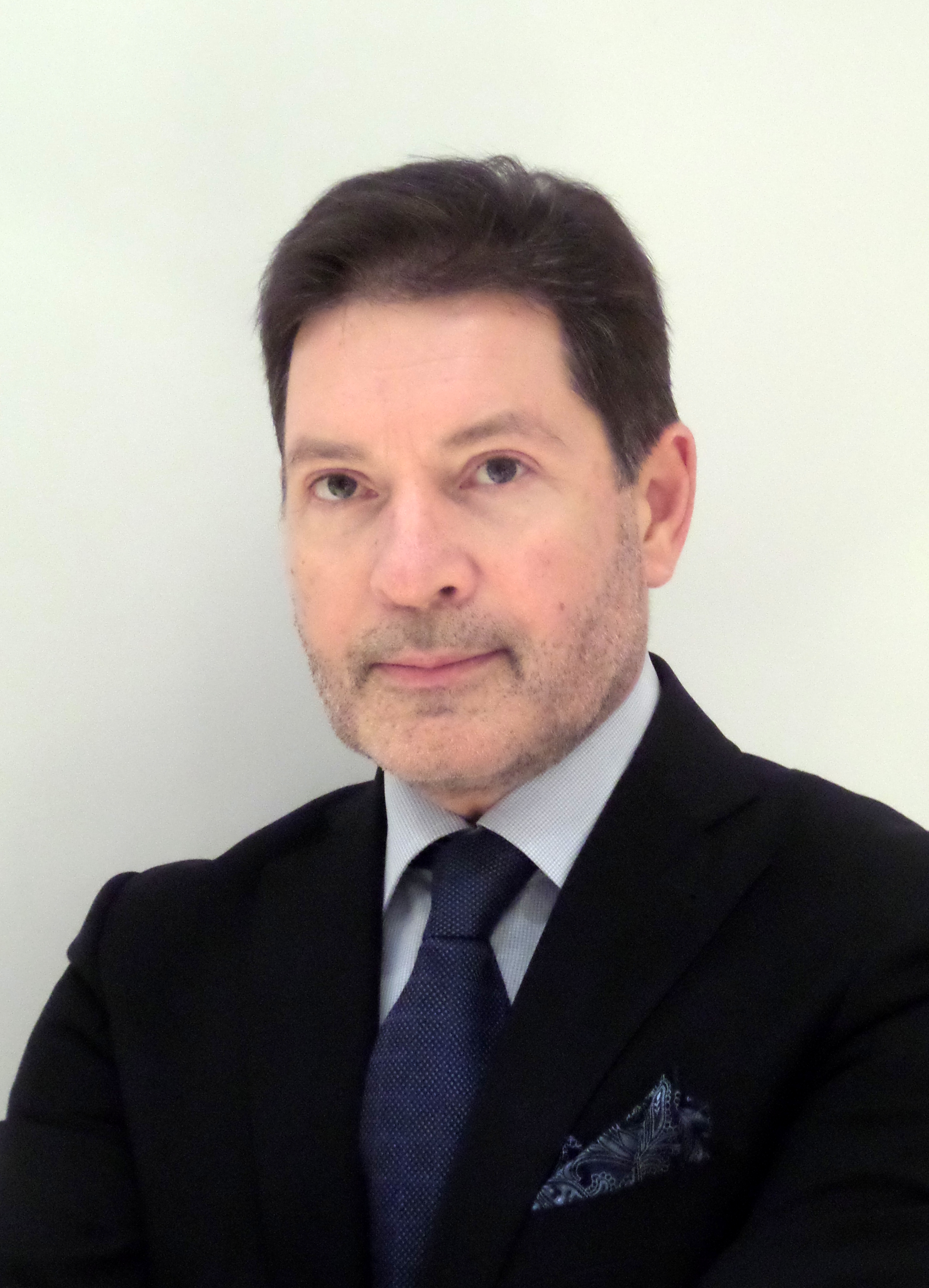
- Bezrukov in 2015
- Born: Andrei Olegovich Bezrukov; August 30, 1960 (age 66); Kansk, Krasnoyarsk Krai, Russian SFSR, USSR
- Other name: Donald Heathfield
- Education: Tomsk State University; Harvard Kennedy School
- Spouse: Elena Stanislavovna Vavilova
- Children: 2
- Awards: Order "For Merit to the Fatherland", 4th class
- Espionage activity
- Allegiance: Soviet Union → Russia
- Service branch: KGB First Chief Directorate; Foreign Intelligence Service
- Service years: 1980s–1991 (Soviet Union); 1991–2010 (Russia)
- Rank: Colonel

Andrey Bezrukov (Russian: Андрей Безруков), often referred to by the cover name Donald Heathfield, and Elena Stanislavovna Vavilova (Russian: Елена Вавилова), often referred to by the cover name Tracey Foley, were former KGB sleeper agents in the United States. Both had participated in the Illegals Program and were arrested in 2010. They were returned to Russia that year.

== Donald Heathfield ==
Andrei Olegovich Bezrukov was born on 30 August 1960 in Kansk, Krasnoyarsk Krai. From 1978 to 1983, he studied at Tomsk State University with a degree in history, where he met his future wife.

Under the assumed name of Donald Howard Heathfield, together with his wife Elena Vavilova, he lived in several countries outside the Soviet Union for more than 20 years, engaged in illegal intelligence activities. According to his undercover identity, Heathfield was the son of a Canadian diplomat (who actually died in 1962 at the age of seven weeks) and graduated from high school in the Czech Republic. A classmate from Harvard University noted that Heathfield kept up to date about the lives of his classmates, including future Mexican President Felipe Calderón.

From 1992 to 1995 he studied at York University in Canada, where he graduated with a bachelor's degree in international economics. From 1995 to 1997, he studied at the École nationale des ponts et chaussées in France, receiving a master's degree in international business. From 1999 onwards, he lived in the United States. In 2000, he graduated from the John F. Kennedy School of Government at Harvard University with a master's degree in public administration.

From May 2000 to May 2006, he worked as a partner in the consulting company Global Partners Inc., whose clients were well-known companies such as Alstom, Boston Scientific, General Electric and T-Mobile. From May 2006 to December 2010, he headed another consulting company, Future Map; the company specialized in government and corporate strategic forecasting and planning systems, and it had branches in Paris and Singapore. Bezrukov was a member of the World Future Society, an organization once described by the Boston Herald as "a factory of thought for new technologies, at a conference of which leading experts in the field of public administration come together". Because of this membership, Heathfield was able to make numerous acquaintances. In particular, he was familiar with two people: Leon Fuerth, a former National Security Advisor to Vice President Al Gore; and a professor of management at George Washington University, William Halal, who participated in the 2008 World Future Society conference. Halal described his relationship with Heathfield as warm. "I came across him at meetings in federal agencies, thought factories, and the World Future Society. I do not know anything that could be of interest from a security perspective. Everything that I provided to Don was published and available via the Internet. "

Bezrukov and his wife lived in Cambridge, Massachusetts. Around that time, Elena Vavilova had graduated from McGill University; before settling in the United States, she had lived in France. She worked at the Redfin real estate agency in Somerville, Massachusetts.

In June 2010, he and his wife were arrested in the United States as part of an undercover operation. On July 9, 2010, he was exchanged in Vienna for four other Russian citizens, along with nine other illegal Russian intelligence agents. Among those exchanged was Sergei Skripal, who had been in a Russian prison for 13 years for passing information to MI6.

After returning to Russia, Bezrukov and his wife were awarded the Order "For Merit to the Fatherland" 4th Class. He was also appointed advisor to the president of Rosneft, as well as an assistant professor at the Department of Applied Analysis of International Problems at the Moscow State Institute of International Relations. In 2015, he published the book Russia and the World in 2020. The contours of a troubled future. After his return, he gave his first interview to the Russian Reporter magazine in 2012. He has also given several other interviews in local media. Today he regularly leads a column in the business newspaper Izvestia on current topics. As of August 2019, Bezrukov was continuing his teaching career and doing consulting work for an oil company, while Vavilova "also has a consultancy role at a company", according to The Guardian. In 2025, the Washington Post reported that Bezrukov was leading an effort to "co-opt part of India’s booming tech sector" by offering transfer of Russian IT and cybersecurity technology. Bezrukov denied that he still worked with Russian intelligence.

== Tracey Foley ==
Elena Stanislavovna Vavilova
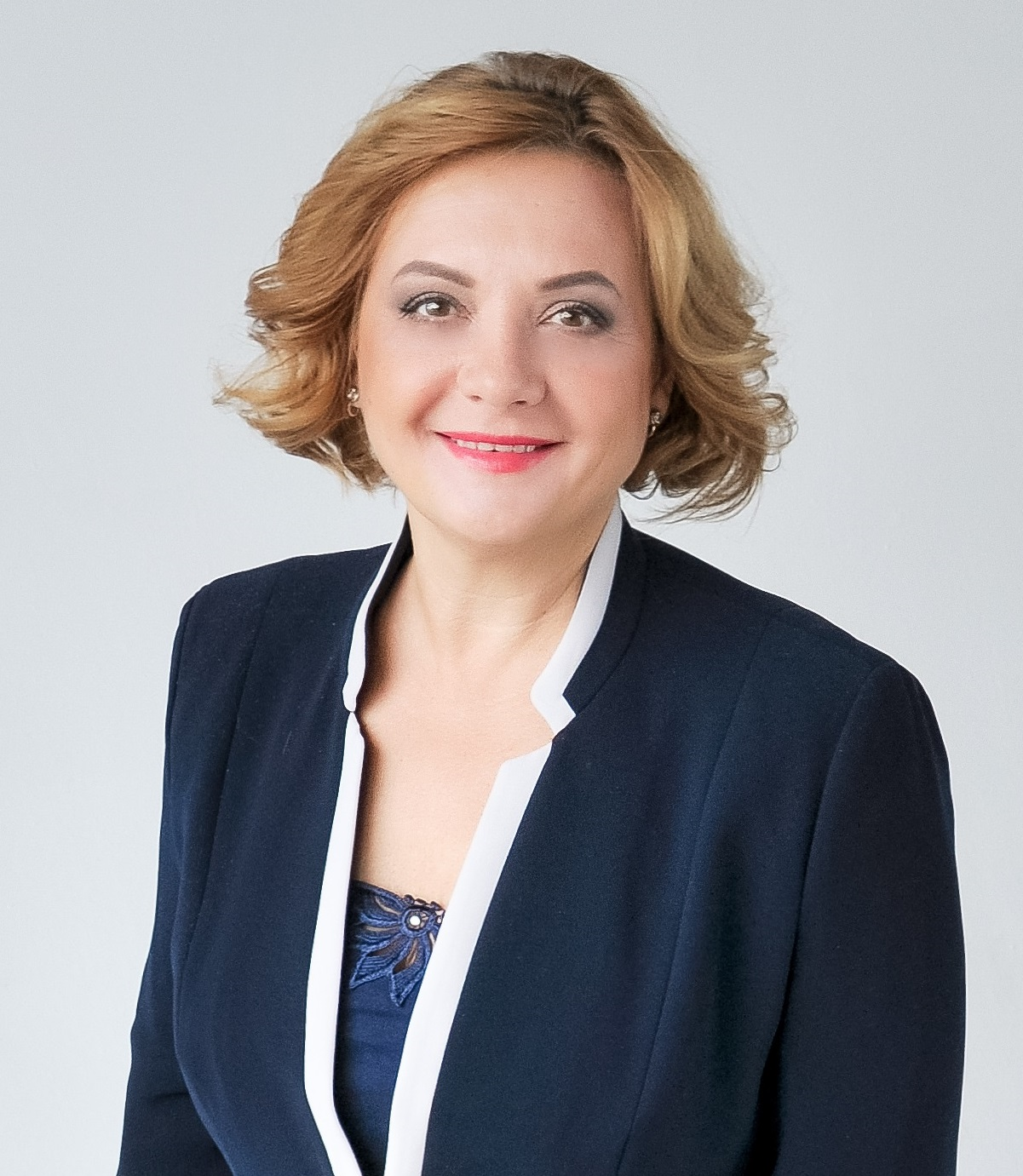
- Born: Elena Stanislavovna Vavilova; November 16, 1962 (age 63); Tomsk, Tomsk Oblast, Russian SFSR, USSR
- Other name: Tracey Foley
- Education: Tomsk State University
- Children: 2
- Espionage activity
- Allegiance: Soviet Union; Russia
- Service branch: KGB First Chief Directorate; Foreign Intelligence Service
- Service years: 1980s–1991 (Soviet Union); 1991–2010 (Russia)
- Rank: Colonel

Elena Stanislavovna Vavilova (Russian: Елена Вавилова); born 16 November 1962), often referred to by the cover name Tracey Foley, is a former KGB sleeper agent. She was born in Tomsk, then part of the Soviet Union, to parents Stanislav Platonovich Vavilov and Svetlana Konstantinovna Vavilova. From 1970 to 1980, she attended a school where she learned German. In 1985, she graduated from Tomsk State University with a degree in history via a distance learning program. While studying there, she met her future husband. After they married, they moved to Moscow to begin training as KGB officers.

After the late 1980s, she worked for almost 25 years as a deep-cover intelligence officer in several countries under the name of Tracy Lee Ann Foley. Her husband, Andrey Bezrukov, worked with her under the assumed name of Donald Howard Heathfield. According to her undercover identity, Foley was born in Canada. While living in Toronto, she gave birth to two sons—Timothy (born 1990) and Alexander (born 1994).

In 1999, the family settled in Cambridge, Massachusetts. Vavilova, then known as Ann Foley, worked as a real estate agent, first at Channing Real Estate and later for the real estate company Redfin. Her former employer described her as “one of the hardest working and most competent agents” that he had.

On June 27, 2010, after a decade of surveillance, Vavilova and her husband were arrested at their Cambridge townhouse as part of an operation carried out by US surveillance agencies. The couple were then released to Russian authorities as part of a prisoner exchange in Vienna. Upon returning to Russia, she and her husband were given the Order "For Merit to the Fatherland" 4th Class.

She currently lives in Moscow with her husband and has become a writer. The family served as the inspiration for the main characters in the TV show The Americans. In 2019 Vavilova published her first spy fiction novel (in Russian), A Woman Who Can Keep Secrets, co-authored with Andrey Bronnikov, a special forces veteran. The novel offers a rare glimpse into the training of Soviet illegals; skills included evading surveillance, coding messages, studying maps and cryptography, learning foreign languages, establishing a cover story, and performing missions abroad to collect intelligence. The book was presented at a press conference of the largest Russian news agency, TASS. Following the book release, Vavilova gave many interviews and appeared on a number of top Russian television and radio programs. Her novel was translated into Bulgarian; in 2021 it was translated into Catalan and Spanish, and it was published by Simbol Editors and Roca-editorial. (The translation was done by Josep Lluis Alay.)

In 2021 Vavilova published her second novel in Russian, The Encrypted Heart; this novel tells the story of a Russian illegal who was sent on a mission to Hong Kong under the name of Stella Lei, and who had a love affair with a French man. Vavilova often lectures for youth organizations, and she conducts seminars on leadership and networking. Together with her husband, she developed the course Strategic Networking, which they teach at the prestigious Orator Club in Moscow.

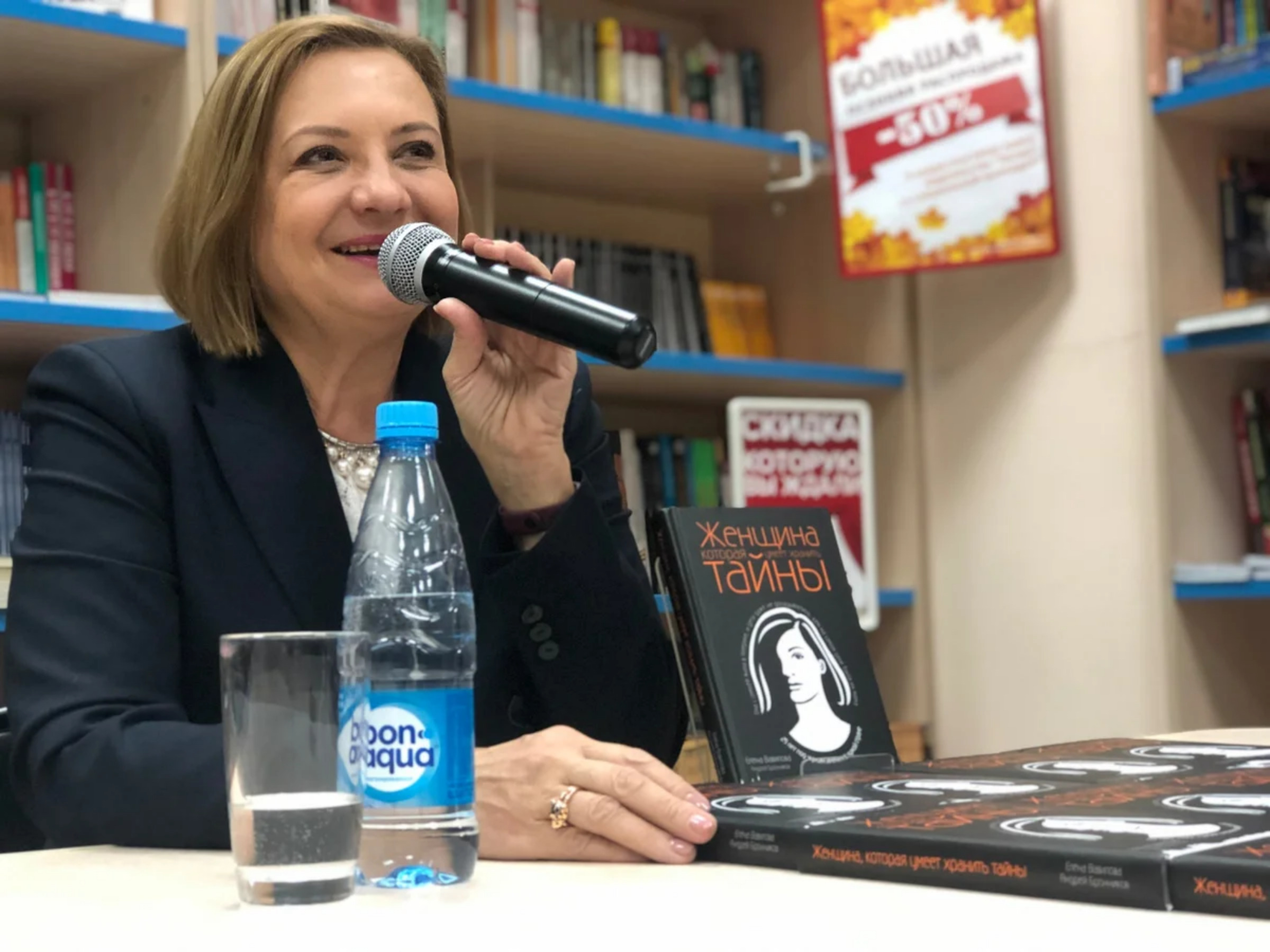
Vavilova promoting her book in 2020

== Children of Heathfield and Foley ==
The children of Heathfield and Foley maintain that they had not previously known that their parents were Russian spies and never heard them speak Russian. At the time of their parents' arrest, the children were 16 and 20 years old. Their Canadian citizenships were revoked, on the grounds that children of foreign diplomats are not entitled to citizenship, even if born on Canadian soil. The younger son, Alex, appealed the decision and ultimately had his citizenship reinstated.
