= Mikhail Vasenkov =

Soviet–Russian colonel, photojournalist, and spy (1942–2022)

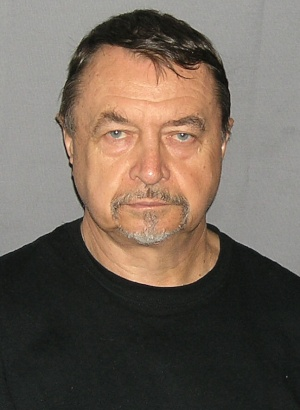
- Vasenkov in 2010
- Born: Mikhail Anatolyevich Vasenkov; 9 October 1942; Kuntsevo, Moscow Oblast, Russian SFSR, USSR
- Died: 6 April 2022 (aged 79); Cuzco, Peru
- Occupations: Military personnel, photojournalists, spy

Mikhail Anatolyevich Vasenkov (Russian: Михаил Анатольевич Васенков; 9 October 1942 – 6 April 2022) was a Soviet–Russian colonel, photojournalist, and spy, honoured as Hero of the Soviet Union in 1990. He was part of the Illegals Program.
