= Vicky Peláez =

Peruvian journalist

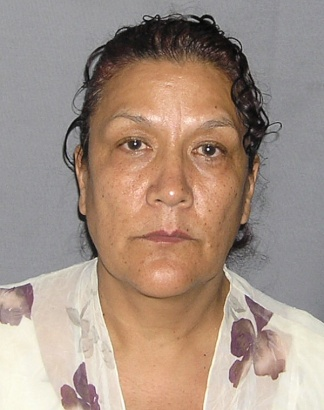
- Photo taken by U.S. Marshals
- Born: 1956 (age 69–70); Cuzco, Peru
- Occupations: Journalist and agent of the Russian Federation
- Known for: Involvement with Russian Illegals Program
- Criminal charge: Conspiracy to act as an unlawful agent of a foreign government
- Criminal penalty: Time served (11 days)
- Criminal status: Deported to Russia
- Spouse: Mikhail Vasenkov (a.k.a. Juan Lazaro)
- Children: Waldo Mariscal; Juan Lazaro Jr.

Virginia "Vicky" Peláez Ocampo (born 1956 in Cuzco, Peru) is a Peruvian journalist and columnist, currently for The Moscow News newspaper. She is known for pleading guilty on 8 July 2010 for working in the United States as an unregistered foreign agent for Russia. She is also known for her leftist writings in El Diario La Prensa, a New York City Spanish language newspaper. Prior to working in the United States, Peláez was one of the first female television reporters in Latin America where she reported for Frecuencia Latina.

== Career ==
Peláez was one of the few women journalists in Peru in the 1980s and established a reputation as a "colorful" reporter for Frecuencia Latina (Channel 2) in Lima. The Peruvian magazine Teleguía called her "the most aggressive journalist on TV." The Peruvian CNN journalist Claudia Rebaza described Peláez in this period as a controversial figure, known for interjecting herself into stories and for a sensationalist style.

In 1984, Peláez and her cameraman Percy Raborg were kidnapped by the Peruvian rebel group Túpac Amaru Revolutionary Movement (MRTA). MRTA demanded Frecuencia Latina air a propaganda video in exchange for the release of Peláez and Raborg. The station agreed to air the video and Peláez and Raborg were released hours after airing. Raborg has since stated that Peláez was a willing participant in the kidnapping.

Peláez moved to the United States shortly after the MRTA incident. She worked for the New York-based El Diario La Prensa for more than two decades. Her far-left writings were critical of United States foreign policy and strongly supportive of Latin American leaders Hugo Chávez and Fidel Castro. At the time of her arrest, Peláez was a resident of Yonkers, New York.

== Illegals Program ==
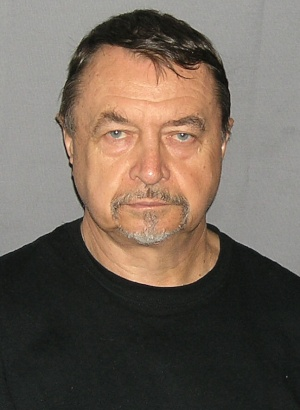
Mikhail A. Vasenkov (Juan Lazaro)

In June 2010, Peláez, along with her husband Mikhail Anatolyevich Vasenkov (Михаил Анатольевич Васенков, alias Juan Lazaro) and nine others, was arrested on charges of conspiracy to act as an agent of a foreign government without notifying the U.S. Attorney General. The operations of this group was dubbed by American authorities as the "Illegals Program" directed by Russia. Waldo Mariscal, the eldest son of Peláez, claimed the U.S. government was persecuting his parents for their political views.

On 8 July 2010, Peláez pleaded guilty to working in the United States as an unregistered foreign agent for Russia, and agreed to be deported and never return, in exchange for the U.S. dropping the more serious charge of money laundering and waiving any jail time.

On 10 July, Peláez and Vasenkov were two of ten Russian agents who were exchanged for four prisoners held by Russia in an elaborate U.S.-Russian deal. They were returned to their handlers in Moscow along with the other traded Russian spies. Peláez and Vasenkov expressed a desire to leave Russia and go to Peru. La República reported that the couple permanently moved to Peru in December 2013.

== Aftermath ==
Since August 2011, Peláez has been a contributor to The Moscow News.
