= Sleeper agent =

Spy in place with no immediate mission

A sleeper agent is a spy or operative who is placed in a target country or organization, not to undertake an immediate mission, but instead to act as a potential asset on short notice if activated in the future. Even if not activated, the "sleeper agent" is still an asset and can still play an active role in sabotage, sedition, espionage, or possibly treason (if enlisted to act against their own country), by virtue of agreeing to act if activated. A team of sleeper agents may be referred to as a sleeper cell, possibly working with others in a clandestine cell system.

== Description ==
In espionage, a sleeper agent is one that has infiltrated a target country and "gone to sleep", sometimes for many years, making no attempt to communicate with the sponsor or their agents—or to obtain information beyond what is publicly available—then becoming active upon receiving a pre-arranged signal from the sponsor or a fellow agent.

The agent acquires jobs and identities, ideally ones that will prove useful in the future, and attempts to blend into everyday life as a normal citizen. Counterespionage agencies in the target country cannot, in practice, closely watch all those who may possibly have been recruited some time before.

In a sense, the best sleeper agents are those who do not need to be paid by the sponsor, as they are able to earn enough money to finance themselves, averting any possibly traceable payments from abroad. In such cases, the sleeper agent may be successful enough to become what is sometimes termed an "agent of influence".

Sleeper agents who have been discovered have often been natives of the target country who moved elsewhere in early life and were co-opted (perhaps for ideological or ethnic reasons) before returning to the target country. That is valuable to the sponsor, as the sleeper's language and other skills can be those of a native, thus less likely to trigger domestic suspicion.

Choosing and inserting sleeper agents has often been difficult, as whether the target will be appropriate some years in the future is uncertain. If the sponsor government and its policies change after the sleeper has been inserted, the sleeper may be found to have been planted in the wrong target.

== Examples ==
=== Real world ===
- Jack Barsky was planted as a sleeper agent in the United States by the Soviet KGB. He was an active sleeper agent between 1978 and 1988. He was located by US authorities in 1994 and then arrested in 1997. Barsky quickly confessed after being arrested and became a useful source of information about spy techniques.
- The Illegals Program was a network of Russian sleeper agents under unofficial cover planted in the US by the Russian Foreign Intelligence Service (SVR). An FBI investigation, "Operation Ghost Stories," culminated in the arrest of ten agents in the US on June 27, 2010, and an eleventh in Cyprus, followed by a prisoner exchange between Russia and the United States on July 9, 2010.
- Anna Chapman: Part of the "Illegals Program," she was one of ten Russian sleeper agents arrested by the FBI in 2010. She had settled in the U.S. under an assumed identity to establish deep-cover connections.

== See also ==
- Double agent
- Fifth column
- Mole (espionage)
- Resident spy
