= Anna Chapman =

Russian intelligence agent, media personality and model (born 1982)

- Анна Чапман
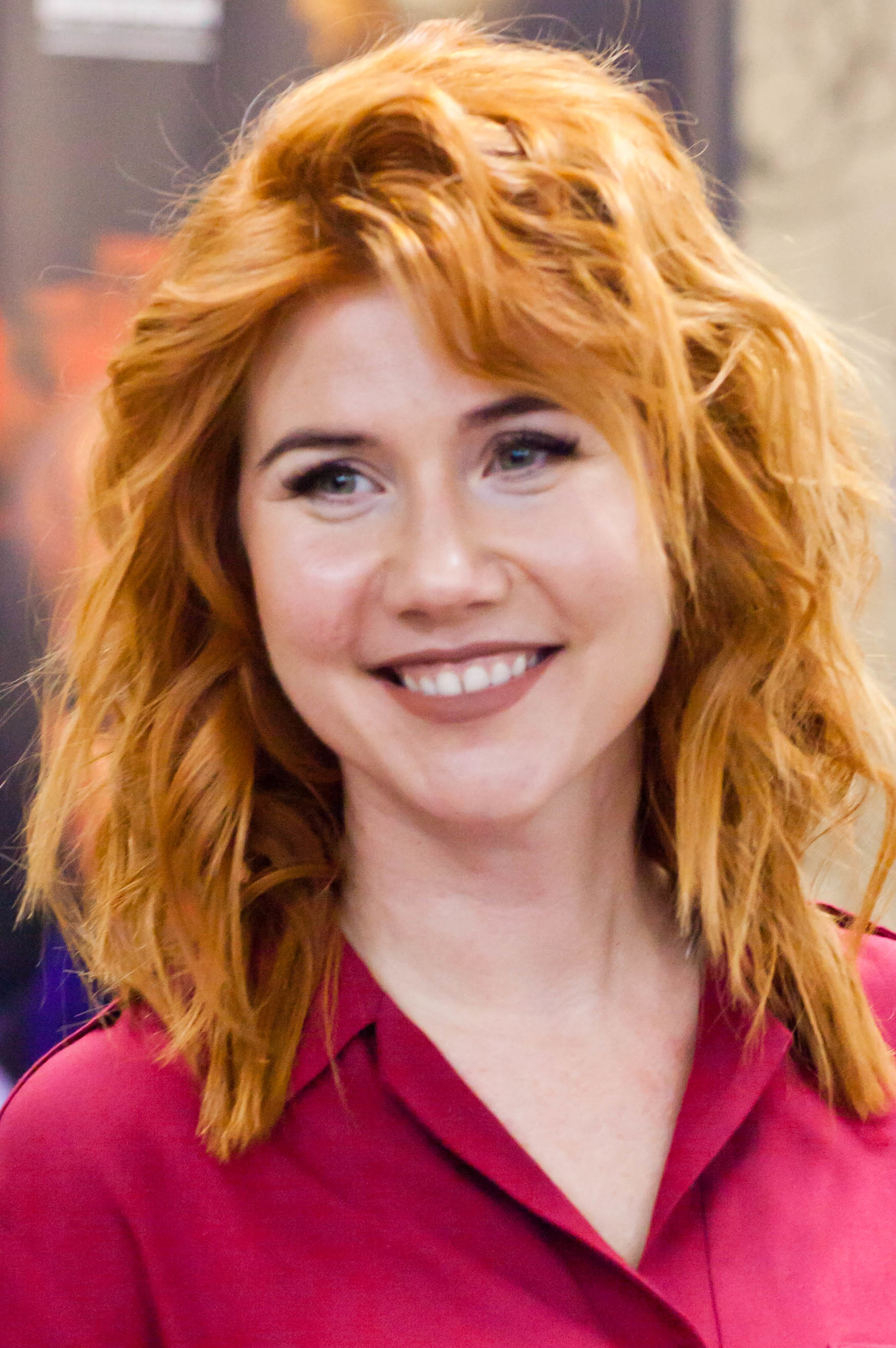
- Chapman in 2019
- Born: Anna Vasilyevna Kushchenko; 23 February 1982 (age 44); Volgograd, Russian SFSR, Soviet Union
- Other names: Anna Kushchenko; Anya Kuschenko; Anya Chapman
- Citizenship: Soviet Union (until 1991); Russia (since 1991); United Kingdom (revoked, until 2010)
- Occupations: Entrepreneur, television host, and agent of the Russian Federation
- Known for: Involvement with Russian Illegals Program
- Criminal charge: Conspiracy to act as an unlawful agent of a foreign government
- Spouse: Alex Chapman (m. 2002; div. 2006)
- Children: 1
- Parent: Vasily Kushchenko
- Relatives: Katya / Dasha (sister)

Anna Vasilyevna Chapman (née Kushchenko; Russian: А́нна Васи́льевна Ча́пман; born 23 February 1982) is a Russian former intelligence agent, media personality, and model who was arrested in the United States on 27 June 2010 as part of the Illegals Program, a Russian spy ring. At the time of her arrest, she was accused of espionage on behalf of the Russian Federation's external intelligence agency, the Sluzhba vneshney razvedki (SVR). She had previously gained British citizenship through marriage, which she used to gain residency in the U.S.

Chapman pleaded guilty to a charge of conspiracy to act as an agent of a foreign government. She and the other Russians were deported to Russia on 8 July 2010, as part of the 2010 Russia–U.S. prisoner swap. Learning that Chapman had wanted to return to the United Kingdom, the UK government revoked her British citizenship and excluded her from the country.

Since her return to Russia, Chapman has worked in a variety of fields, including for the government as head of a youth council, a catwalk model in Russian fashion shows, and running a television series.

== Early life ==
Chapman was born Anna Vasilyevna Kushchenko (А́нна Васи́льевна Кущéнко) on 23 February 1982.

Her father, Vasily Kushchenko, was reportedly a senior KGB official who once served as the Russian ambassador to Kenya, and in 2010 occupied a senior position at the Russian Ministry of Foreign Affairs.

According to her ex-husband, Anna earned a master's degree in economics with first class honours from Moscow State University. According to other sources, she got her degree from Peoples' Friendship University of Russia.

== Zimbabwe: 2001 ==
In 2001, Brighton DJ Marcus Read, aged 37, met Anna Kushchenko, who was 19, in a club while he was working on holiday in Harare, Zimbabwe. Anna Kushchenko persuaded Marcus Read to sign a form to formally invite her to the UK, which needed two other witnesses. Chapman then came to Britain in the summer. Anna Chapman told Marcus Read that her father was in the KGB. Anna was staying with her father, then Russian ambassador to Zimbabwe.

== London: 2001–2006 ==
In 2001, Anna Kushchenko and Marcus Read went to a rave party at his friend's warehouse flat in London Docklands, where Kushchenko met former public schoolboy from Bournemouth Alex Chapman, who worked at Sony, and she "ditched" Marcus Read. She married Alex Chapman shortly thereafter in Moscow, and she gained British citizenship, in addition to her native Russian one, and a British passport.

In 2003, or 2004, Anna Chapman moved to London where she worked at NetJets and Barclays.

Anna and Alex Chapman divorced in 2006. In March 2018, it was reported that Alex Chapman had died in May 2015, aged 36, from a drug overdose.

== New York: 2009–2010 ==
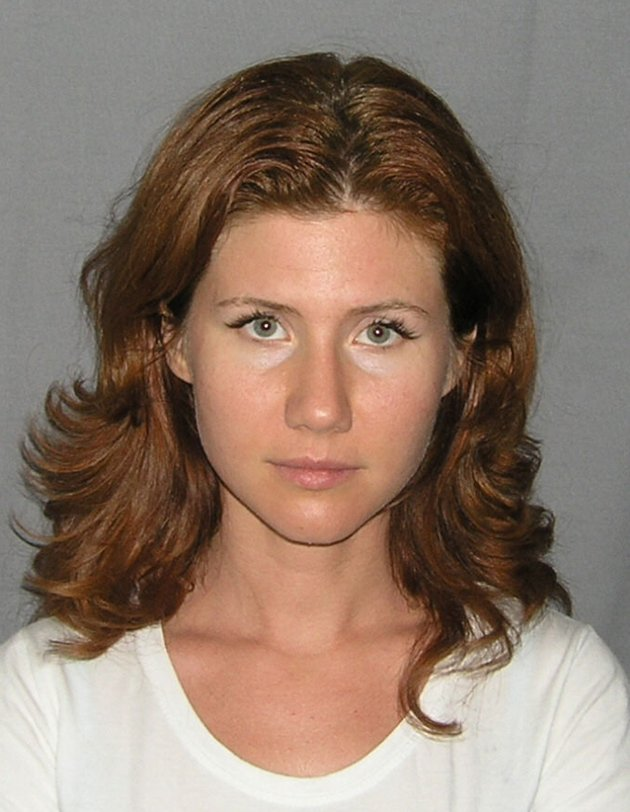
Chapman's 2010 mugshot

In 2009, Chapman moved to New York, taking up residence at 20 Exchange Place, one block from Wall Street in Manhattan. Her LinkedIn social networking site profile identified her as CEO of PropertyFinder LLC, a website selling real estate internationally. Her husband Alex stated that Anna told him the enterprise was continually in debt for the first couple of years. But suddenly in 2009, she had as many as 50 employees and a successful business.

Chapman was reportedly in a relationship with Michel Bittan, a divorced Israeli-Moroccan restaurant owner, while she was living in New York. Around this time, she had allegedly attempted to purchase ecstasy tablets. She later described her time in the United States with the Charles Dickens quote, "it was the best of times, it was the worst of times".

After Anna was arrested in New York on charges of spying, Alex hired media publicist Max Clifford, and sold her story to The Daily Telegraph. She pleaded guilty to conspiracy to act as an agent of a foreign government without notifying the U.S. Attorney General. In 2010 she was deported to Russia as part of a prisoner exchange between the United States and Russia.

== Illegals Program and arrest ==
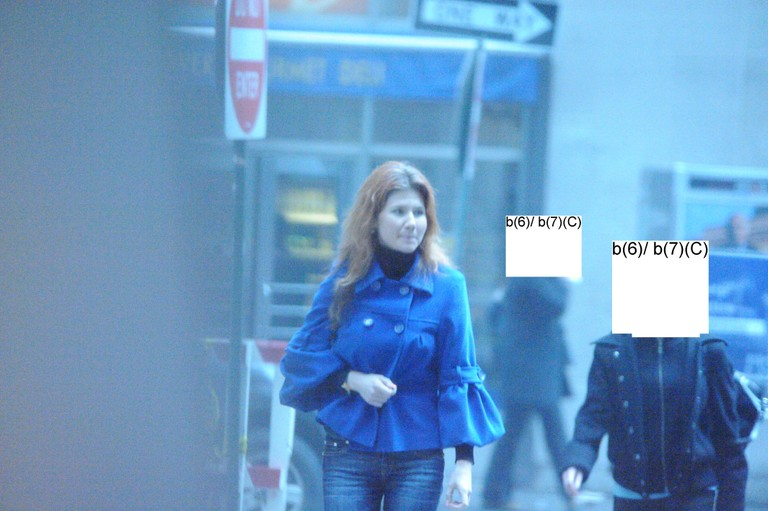
Anna Chapman's Surveillance Images

Chapman is one of only two of the Illegals Program Russians arrested in June 2010 who did not use an assumed name.

=== Recruitment ===
Chapman is believed to have been recruited by the SVR in or around 2000.

=== Communications issues ===
In April 2010, Chapman reportedly began to experience communication failures that were later attributed to U.S. interference.

=== Arrest ===
Officials claimed Chapman worked with a network of others, until an undercover FBI agent attempted to draw her into a trap at a Manhattan coffee shop. The FBI agent offered Chapman a fake passport, with instructions to forward it to another spy. He asked, "Are you ready for this step?" to which Chapman replied, "Of course." She accepted the passport. But, after making a series of phone calls to her father Vasily Kushchenko in Moscow, Chapman took his advice and handed the passport in at a local police station. She was arrested shortly after.

=== International exchange ===
After being formally charged, Chapman and nine other detainees became part of a spy swap deal between the United States and Russia, the biggest of its kind since 1986. The ten Russian agents returned to Russia via a chartered jet that landed at Vienna International Airport in Austria, where the swap occurred on the morning of 8 July 2010. The Russian jet returned to Moscow's Domodedovo Airport where, after landing, the ten spies were kept away from local and international press.

=== Revocation of UK citizenship ===
According to a statement from her American lawyer Robert Baum and media reports, Chapman had wanted to move to the UK. The Home Office exercised special powers via the British Home Secretary to revoke Chapman's British citizenship to prevent her return to the UK. This was done under section 40 of the British Nationality Act 1981, introduced as part of the Nationality, Immigration and Asylum Act 2002 and Immigration, Asylum and Nationality Act 2006. This power had at that point only been used against a dozen people since its introduction. The Home Office issued legal papers revoking her citizenship on 13 July 2010. Steps were taken to exclude Chapman, meaning she could not travel to the UK. After Chapman's departure to Russia, Baum reiterated that his client had wished to stay in the UK; he also said that she was "particularly upset" by the revocation of her UK citizenship and exclusion from the country.

== Russia: since 2010 ==
In late December 2010, Chapman was appointed to the public council of Young Guard of United Russia. According to the organization, she would "be engaged in educating young people". On 21 January 2011, Chapman began hosting a weekly TV show in Russia called Secrets of the World for REN TV. In June 2011, Chapman was appointed as editor of Venture Business News magazine, according to Bloomberg News.

Chapman testified to the closed trial in absentia of Col. Alexander Poteyev, an ex-KGB soldier, which took place in Moscow in May and June 2011. Chapman testified that only Poteyev could have provided the U.S. authorities with the information that led to her arrest in 2010; She also alleged that she was arrested shortly after an undercover U.S. agent contacted her using a code that only Poteyev and her personal handler would have known.

Chapman wrote a column for Komsomolskaya Pravda. In October 2011, she was accused of plagiarizing material on Alexander Pushkin from a book by Kremlin spin doctor Oleg Matveychev. The Guardian reported that this incident added to general negative opinions of her in certain sections of Russian society; it said that in September 2011, she had been "heckled during a speech on leadership at St Petersburg University". Students had, it said, displayed signs stating: "Chapman, get out of the university!", and "The Kremlin and the porn studio are in the other direction!"

In 2012, FBI counter-intelligence chief Frank Figliuzzi said that Chapman almost caught a senior member of Barack Obama's cabinet in a honey trap operation. This was reported as a primary motive behind the government's action to round up the ten-person spy ring in which she was a member. The plan reportedly would have involved Chapman seducing her target before extracting information from him. Subsequent reporting suggested that these initial reports were inaccurate; officials from the U.S. Department of Justice claimed that the FBI's concern was that another of the alleged spies, Cynthia Murphy, "had been in contact with Alan Patricof, a fundraiser and 'personal friend' of Hillary Clinton".

== Armenia and Nagorno-Karabakh: 2013–present ==
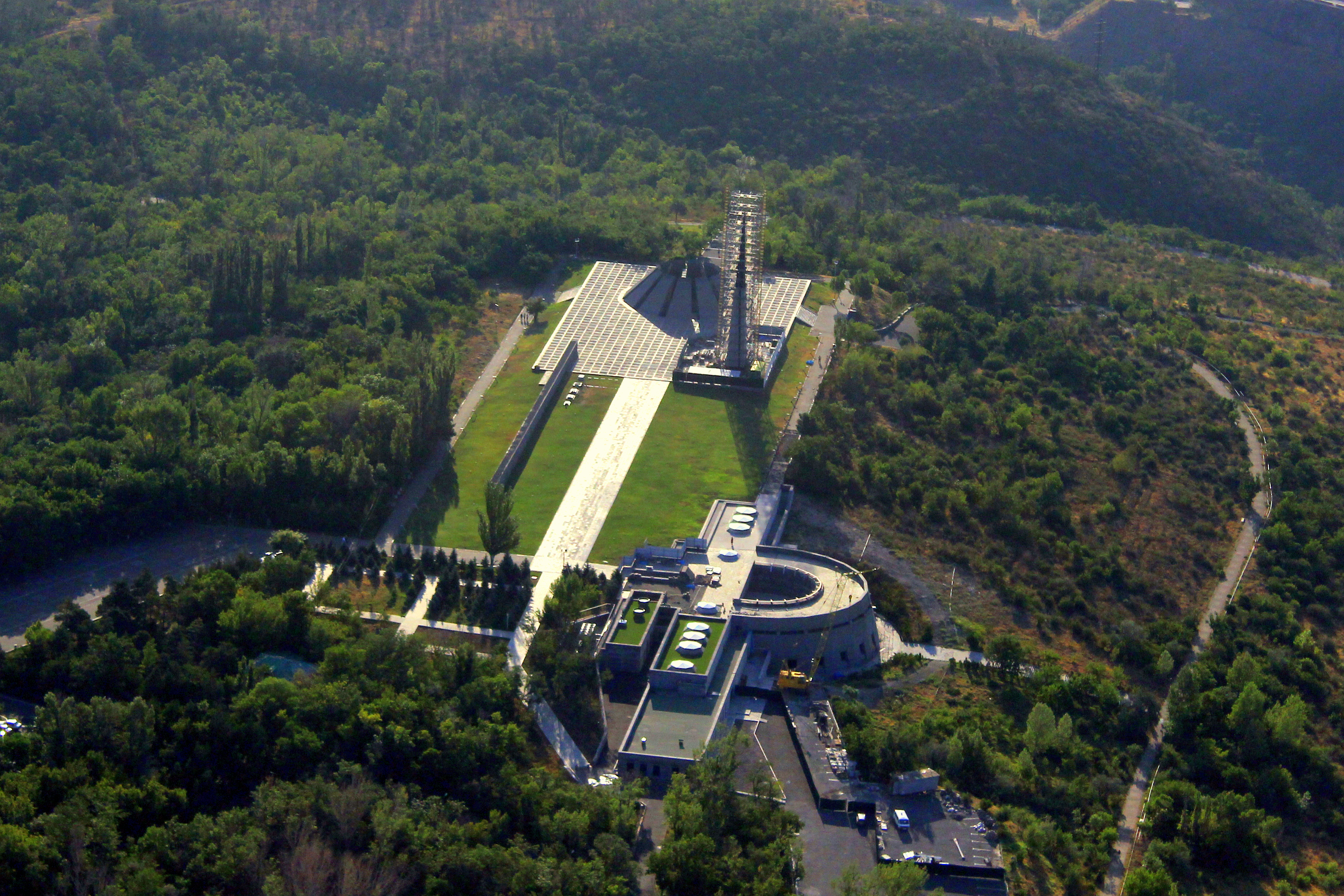
Tsitsernakaberd memorial and the museum

Chapman was sighted in the Armenian breakaway region of Nagorno-Karabakh in August 2013. She arrived with a group of Russian officials to discuss issues with the Republic of Artsakh to resolve their conflict with Azerbaijan over the territory. She reportedly was also working on her television show, Mysteries of the World. Her visit caused an outcry in Azerbaijan; its foreign ministry declared that Chapman and the other Russian visitors would be classified as personae non gratae in Azerbaijan.

Chapman later visited Tsitsernakaberd, a memorial in Armenia dedicated to the victims of the Armenian genocide. She said in an interview that her visit to Armenia taught her the importance of family relationships, and that her best friends were Armenians. She said that she was impressed by the family values expressed in Armenian society, saying that Russian society lacked that, and she was learning a lot from Armenia.

== Media coverage and popular reaction ==
In 2010, after her arrest by the FBI for her part in the Illegals Program, Chapman gained celebrity status. Photos of Chapman taken from her Facebook profile appeared on the web, and several videos of her were uploaded to YouTube.

In 2010, Fundservice Bank (later Roscosmos bank, then Promsvyaz bank), a Moscow bank that handles payments on behalf of state and private-sector enterprises in the Russian aerospace industry has employed Chapman as an adviser on investment and innovation issues to the President.

In 2010, magazines and blogs detailed Chapman's fashion style and dress sense, while tabloids displayed her action figure dolls. Chapman was described by local media in New York as "stunning" and a regular of exclusive bars and restaurants. U.S. Vice President Joe Biden, when jokingly asked by Jay Leno on NBC's The Tonight Show with Jay Leno, "Do we have any spies that hot?", replied jokingly, "Let me be clear. It was not my idea to send her back."

In 2010, Chapman posed as a model for the cover of Russian version of Maxim magazine in Agent Provocateur lingerie. The magazine included Chapman in its list of "Russia's 100 sexiest women." Chapman has also made an appearance as a runway model for Moscow Fashion Week at the Shiyan & Rudkovskaya show in 2011, and for Antalya at the Dosso Dossi in 2012.

In 2013, Chapman parlayed her media capital through Twitter, where she asked Edward Snowden to marry her, and on Instagram, which she has used to voice her political opinions.

In 2026, Spy Next Door: The Anna Chapman Story a Channel 4 two-part documentary, that chronicles her activities in the UK and the USA, arrest in New York City and return to Russia, debuted.

== Personal life ==
Chapman gave birth to a child in 2015, but has kept the identity of the father secret.

== See also ==
- Jack Barsky
- Maria Butina
- The Illegals by Shaun Walker
