= Igor Sutyagin =

Russian physicist

- Игорь Сутягин
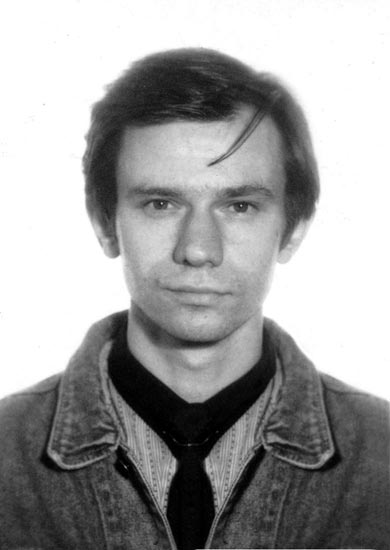
- Sutyagin in the 1990s
- Born: 17 January 1965 (age 61)
- Occupations: Arms control and nuclear weapons specialist
- Spouse: Irina Manannikova
- Children: Oksana, Anastasiya

Igor Vyacheslavovich Sutyagin (Russian: И́горь Вячесла́вович Сутя́гин; born 17 January 1965) is a Russian arms control and nuclear weapons specialist. In 1998, he became the head of the subdivision for Military-Technical and Military-Economic Policy at the Institute for US and Canadian Studies of the Russian Academy of Sciences in Moscow, where he worked before he was arrested for treason on accusations he had given information to a British company, although he had no access to classified documentation as a civilian researcher. Sutyagin spent 11 years in prison on espionage charges and was released by Russia in 2010 in exchange for the release of a group of spies arrested in the United States.

As of 2018, Sutyagin is a Research Fellow at the Royal United Services Institute for Defence and Security Studies in London.

== Background and trial ==
With a degree in physics as well as history, Sutyagin worked on topics relating to U.S. and Russian nuclear weapons development, deployment and control and he is a co-author of a book on the Russian strategic nuclear forces.

In October 1999, the Russian Federal Security Service detained Sutyagin and brought charges of espionage against him. They alleged that Sutyagin passed classified information to a London-based firm, Alternative Futures. Sutyagin acknowledged working with the company, but he said that all information about nuclear submarines he disclosed was based on material in the open literature and that, not having a security clearance, he never had access to classified sources.

In 2004, after a trial, a jury in Moscow unanimously found Sutyagin guilty of espionage. The jury found that Sutyagin disclosed secret information to Defense Intelligence Agency officers Shaun Kidd and Nadya Lokk, and that Sutyagin was paid for this. The court sentenced Sutyagin to 15 years of imprisonment. In December 2005 Sutyagin was transferred to a penal colony in Kholmogory near Arkhangelsk.

== Reactions ==
Sutyagin was listed as a political prisoner by Human Rights Watch and Amnesty International. Human Rights Watch stated that "the FSB showed little respect for Sutiagin’s right to a fair trial: the charges against him were vaguely worded; his assertion that he only used open sources were never verified; investigators based the charges on secret decrees that Sutiagin was not allowed to see; the FSB violated numerous rules of criminal procedure; and officials publicly denounced Sutiagin as a spy prior to and during his trial. Human rights activists argued that he had no access to secrets and had been working openly with academics.

== US–Russia spy swap ==
On 9 July 2010, Sutyagin along with three other pardoned agents was released by Russia in exchange for the release of 10 people arrested in the United States of spying for Russia. Sutyagin had always maintained his innocence but agreed to sign an admission of guilt as part of the deal. Sutyagin reports that he had been asked to sign a pardon request falsely admitting guilt as early as 2005. Shortly after his release, he told RFE/RL in an interview in August 2010, he just had been working for money. ("They criticize me for earning money.") Sutyagin hopes to rejoin his wife Irina Manannikova and daughters Oksana and Anastasiya. The US State Department does not consider Sutyagin to be a spy.

In 2011, European Court of Human Rights has found violations of Articles 5 and 6 of European Convention on Human Rights by Russian authorities in Sutyagin's case.

== See also ==
- Wen Ho Lee
