= The Project on Forward Engagement =

Term coined by Leon Fuerth

Forward Engagement is a term coined by Leon Fuerth, former National Security Advisor to Vice President Al Gore, to describe the process of thinking systematic about long-range issues in governance. As a concept, Forward Engagement draws heavily on the fields of Futures Studies and Complex Systems Research.

== Concept ==
Forward Engagement asserts: (1) that major social change is accelerating at a rate fast enough to challenge the adaptive capacity of whole societies; (2) that governments ought to address such possibilities as far in advance as possible; and (3) that there needs to be a system to help governments visualize more consistently what may be approaching in order to deliberate sufficiently about responses.

Further, Forward Engagement makes the proposition that there has been a shift in the nature of the major problems societies face: they increasingly interact with other problems, blur the lines between foreign and domestic, produce unplanned consequences, and mutate into new problems as parts of continuing processes. Such "complex" societal problems call for interdisciplinary and anticipatory approaches to problem solving.

== Project ==
Forward Engagement has been the subject of a project funded by the George Washington University and the Rockefeller Brothers Fund and directed by Leon Fuerth since 2001. The project recently examined three massive global contingencies—anthropogenic climate change, a geopolitical power-shift to Asia, and the attainment of means to rapidly and drastically alter human evolution through technology—through a series of working groups led by Fuerth, along with Clyde V. Prestowitz Jr., Philip Rubin, and others. Forward Engagement is additionally the subject of a graduate course at the Elliott School of International Affairs.
