= Gordon Corera =

British author and journalist

Gordon Corera (born 1974) is a British author and journalist. He was the BBC's Security Correspondent and specialised in computer technology from 2004 to November 2024. He now co-presents the podcast The Rest is Classified, which is about intelligence operations.

== Early life ==
Corera was born in London; his father was from the state of Tamil Nadu in southern India and his mother is German. The family has a home near Cavelossim, in the state of Goa in western India, for which he says he has a deep affection and where he visits regularly.

Corera was educated at University College School, an independent school for boys in Hampstead in northwest London, followed by St Peter's College at the University of Oxford, where he studied Modern History, followed by graduate studies in US foreign policy at Harvard University.

== Career ==
Corera worked on the re-election campaign of President Bill Clinton. He joined the BBC in 1997 as a researcher and later became a reporter. He has worked on Radio 4's The World Tonight, BBC2's Newsnight, and worked in the US as the BBC's State Department correspondent and as an analyst for the BBC's coverage of the 2000 US presidential election. In 2001 he became the foreign reporter for Radio 4's Today programme. He was appointed BBC News' security correspondent in 2004.

Corera presented the 2009 Radio 4 programme MI6: A Century in the Shadows, a three-part history of Britain's Secret Intelligence Service.

Since 2024 he has co-presented the podcast The Rest Is Classified with David McCloskey, which covers intelligence operations, and is produced by Goalhanger Podcasts.

== Bibliography ==
- Shopping for Bombs: Nuclear Proliferation, Global Insecurity, and the Rise and Fall of the A.Q. Khan Network. Hurst. 2006. ISBN 978-1850658269.
- MI6: Life and Death in the British Secret Service. Orion. 2011. ISBN 978-0297860990.
- Cyberspies: The Secret History of Surveillance, Hacking, and Digital Espionage. Pegasus Publications. 2015. ISBN 978-1-68177-154-0.
- Operation Columba: The Secret Pigeon Service—The Untold Story of World War II Resistance in Europe. William Morrow. 2018. ISBN 978-0-06-266707-6.
- Russians Among Us: Sleeper Cells, Ghost Stories, and the Hunt for Putin's Spies. HarperCollins. 2020. ISBN 978-0-06-288941-6.
- The Spy in the Archive: How One Man Tried to Kill the KGB. William Collins. 2025. ISBN 978-0-00-864479-6.
