= Aleksandr Poteyev =

Soviet and Russian intelligence officer who defected to the United States

- Александр Потеев
- Born: March 7, 1952 (age 74); Brest Region, Byelorussian SSR, Soviet Union
- Occupation: Former Deputy Head of Directorate "S"
- Spouse: Marina
- Children: 2

Aleksandr Nikolayevich Poteyev (Note: Russian: Александр Николаевич Потеев) (born March 7, 1952) is a former Colonel and Deputy Head of Directorate "S" of the Russian Foreign Intelligence Service (SVR) who revealed a hidden network of Russian spies known as the Illegals Program. He is believed to be living in the United States under an assumed identity.

== Early life ==
Poteyev was born in the Brest Region of the Republic of Belarus on March 7, 1952. His father, Nikolai Pavlovich Poteyev, was recognized as a Hero of the USSR.

== Military career ==
Poteyev's career began in the 1970s when he enlisted in the army, later joining the KGB and serving in Afghanistan as part of elite special forces units. In the 1980s, he was awarded the Order of the Red Banner for his service in Kabul. After returning from Afghanistan, he graduated from the Academy of Foreign Intelligence. In the 1990s, he began traveling to several Western countries under the guise of a representative from the Russian Ministry of Foreign Affairs.

== Recruitment by the United States ==
Around 1999, Poteyev was working under cover at the Russian mission in New York when he offered his services as a walk-in to the FBI. Alternatively, it was reported he began working in secret for the CIA after being approached by the Internal Revenue Service on allegations of underpayment of taxes. In 2000, he was appointed Deputy Head of Directorate "S" of the SVR, which oversaw a network of Russian spies in the United States. Around this time, he is said to have received between $2–5 million for information he provided to the CIA.

== Defection to the United States ==
In June 2010, Poteyev fled from Russia as lie detector tests were being prepared to find a mole within the SVR. He traveled through Belarus, Ukraine, and Germany before arriving at CIA headquarters in the US on June 26, 2010. The following day, the FBI began arresting the Russian spy ring, including prominent figures like Anna Chapman. He is suspected of also providing intelligence on Sergey Cherepanov, a Madrid-based Russian Illegal, as well as Andreas and Heidrun Anschlag, a German-based Russian spy couple.

== Russian reaction ==
In November 2010, Russian news agency Kommersant reported that the defector who betrayed the Russian spies was Colonel Shcherbakov of the SVR. Days later, a rival news agency, RIA Novosti, reported that the actual defector was Poteyev. In 2011, he was found guilty of desertion and high treason in absentia, and was sentenceed to 25 years in prison. In 2016, Russian news agency Interfax falsely reported that Poteyev had died in the United States. He is on Russia's international wanted list.

== Residence at Trump Tower ==
Since his defection, Poteyev has received a number of unsolicited visitors at his condominium at Trump Towers in Sunny Isles Beach, Florida. In 2014, he was approached by a suspected Russian hit man on a valid U.S. visa. In 2016, Poteyev got a recreational fishing license at a Walmart in Florida, disclosing his real name and date of birth, phone number, email, and mailing address. In 2017, journalists for BuzzFeed News knocked on his door, but were turned away. In 2020, forced to participate by exploiting his double life, Hector Alejandro Cabrera Fuentes, a Mexican-Singaporean microbiologist, was arrested by the FBI after he was caught performing reconnaissance at the Trump Tower complex as part of a Russian assassination plot.
