= Leon Fuerth =

American diplomat (born 1939)

Personal details
- Born: Leon Sigmund Fuerth; 1939 (age 86–87) Denver, Colorado, U.S.
- Party: Democratic
- Education: New York University (BA, MA); Harvard University (MPA)

Leon Sigmund Fuerth (born 1939) is a former diplomat who served as national security adviser to former U.S. Vice President Al Gore. He was succeeded in that capacity by Scooter Libby in January 2001. Fuerth now directs the Project on Forward Engagement at the George Washington University, where he also serves as a professor of international affairs.

== Education ==
Fuerth has a B.A. in English and an M.A. in History from New York University. He earned an M.P.A. from Harvard after serving as an officer in the United States Air Force.

== Early career ==
Prior to beginning work on Capitol Hill in 1979, Fuerth spent eleven years as a foreign service officer with the State Department. His diplomatic posts included the U.S. Consulate General in Zagreb, Yugoslavia. He also worked in the office of the Counselor of the Department; the Bureau of Intelligence and Research; and in both the Bureau of Political Military Affairs and the Bureau of European Affairs in several capacities. He became a resource for strategic intelligence (chemical, biological, radiological and nuclear weapons); arms control; Soviet and Warsaw Pact affairs; and NATO.

After working for Congressman Les Aspin as staff director of the sub-committee on covert action in the House Permanent Select Committee on Intelligence, Fuerth spent many years working for Al Gore in a variety of capacities. In the 1980s he worked for Congressman Gore on issues such as arms control and stability. In 1985 Fuerth joined Gore's senatorial staff where he also worked on issues of national security.

== White House career ==
When Gore became Vice President in January, 1993, Fuerth became his national security adviser. He operated, by Presidential order, as a full member of the Principals and Deputies Committees in both the National Security Council and the National Economic Council. During his tenure he worked on issues relating to the following countries: South Africa, Russia, Egypt, Ukraine and Kazakhstan. His former experiences as a foreign service officer in the Balkans proved useful in his pursuit of sanctions against Slobodan Milošević's regime in Serbia, his tenacious approach earning the nickname 'Mr Sanctions' from President Clinton. Through his management of a bilateral commission with South Africa, Fuerth also spent time fighting the spread of AIDS. He would have likely been named Presidential National Security Advisor, had Gore prevailed in the 2000 election.

== Academic career ==
Upon leaving public service, Fuerth joined academia. He is a research professor at the Elliott School of International Affairs at the George Washington University in Washington, D.C. In this capacity, he teaches graduate students and works to develop the concept of "forward engagement," with support from both the university and the Rockefeller Brothers Fund. The Project on Forward Engagement seeks to develop the means to incorporate systematic long-range thinking into national and global policymaking. Fuerth continues to be active in the Democratic Party, and acted as a foreign policy adviser to Howard Dean during his 2004 Presidential candidacy. He is also a guiding coalition member of the Project on National Security Reform.
