= Jack Barsky =

German-American author and former KGB spy (born 1949)

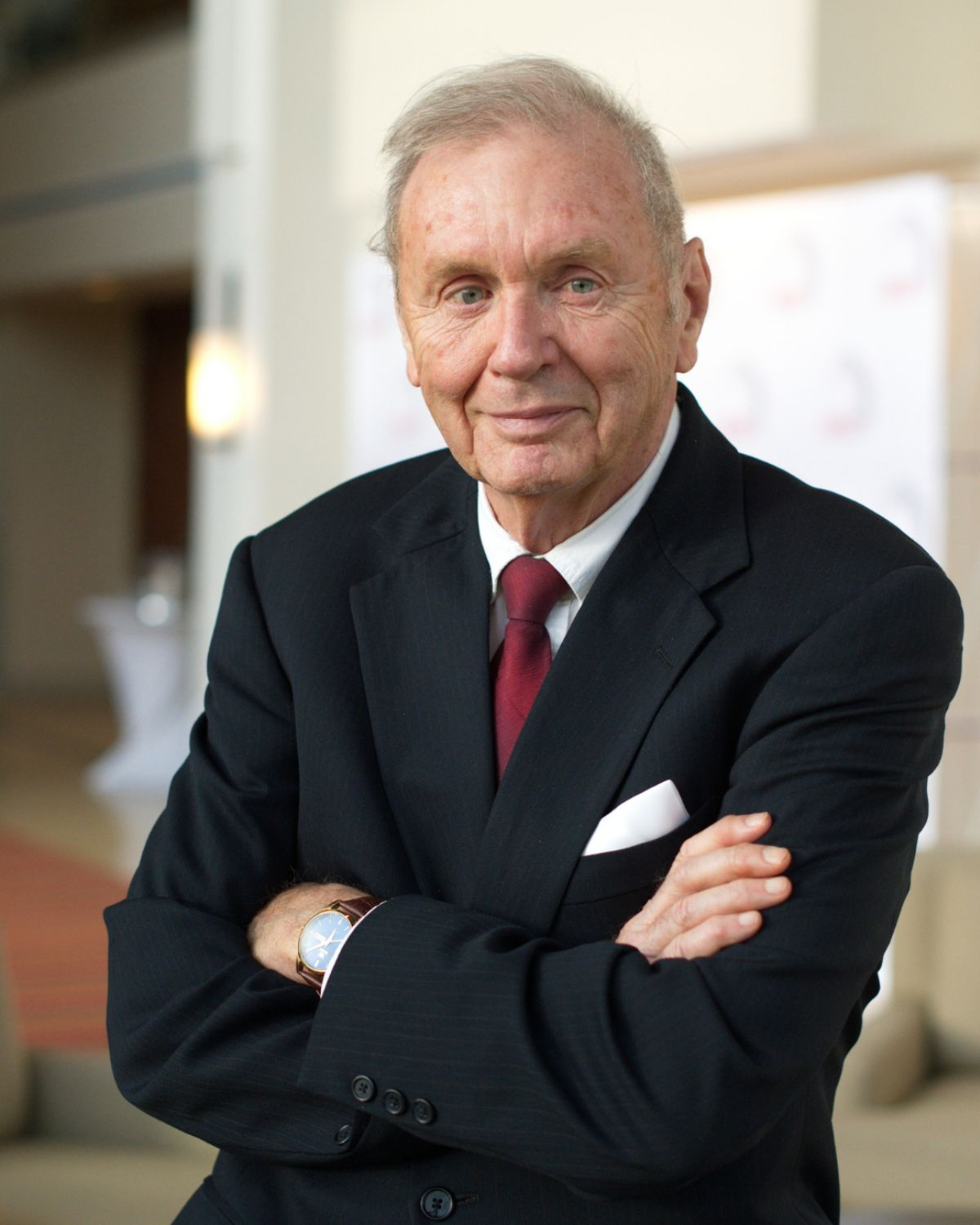
- Barsky in 2015
- Born: Albrecht Dittrich; 18 May 1949 (age 77) (Note: In her letter to Gorbachev, his mother stated his birthday as May 18, 1949. November 13 is the birthdate of the child Jack Barsky, the identity he stole.); Rietschen, Saxony, East Germany
- Other name: Jack Philip Barsky
- Occupations: Author, Chief Information Officer
- Years active: 1973–1988
- Known for: Spy for the KGB
- Notable work: Deep Undercover: My Secret Life and Tangled Allegiances as a KGB Spy in America
- Children: 5

Jack Philip Barsky (born Albrecht Dittrich; 18 May 1949) is a German-American author, former chief information officer (CIO) at a Fortune 500 energy firm and former operative of the KGB who spied on the United States from 1978 to 1988. Exposed after the Cold War had ended, Barsky became a resource for U.S. counterintelligence agencies, and held executive technology roles at major U.S. corporations. He was not charged with any crime and was allowed to remain in the United States. His autobiography, Deep Undercover, was published in 2017, and he frequently speaks on his experiences and as an expert on espionage.

== Early life ==
Dittrich was born in Rietschen in Upper Lusatia, and grew up in Köbeln, part of Bad Muskau. His father, a schoolteacher, was a committed Marxist–Leninist. He has a brother, Günther, who is three years younger. When Dittrich was 14, he was sent away to boarding school in Spremberg. Shortly after that, his parents divorced. He graduated from Karl-Marx-Gymnasium (now Erwin-Strittmatter-Gymnasium) and earned a degree in chemistry at the University of Jena.

== KGB career ==
In 1969, Dittrich was a senior at the University of Jena when he was approached by a member of the Stasi who asked if he was interested in a job at VEB Carl Zeiss Jena. This turned out to be a ruse, however, and he was offered a job with the KGB. The next year, he was studying for a doctorate in chemistry and working as an assistant professor when he was sent to East Berlin for several weeks of training with the KGB. He was told that the Soviet Union only had use for spies who were willing participants, and thus he was free to turn down the offer, but that he had only 24 hours to decide. Intrigued, he decided to join.

In February 1973, Dittrich announced to his family and friends that he was becoming a diplomat and leaving university to move to East Berlin. The KGB taught him Morse code, cryptography and techniques to avoid surveillance, as well as English. He was sent to Moscow in 1975, where his English was evaluated by an American woman who had married a Russian. He underwent two further years of training in the Soviet Union.

In 1978, Dittrich was sent to the United States as an agent. His alias, Jack Philip Barsky, was taken from a child who had died in 1955 at the age of 10, whose name KGB agents had found at a Jewish cemetery in Maryland. He was also given a back story that his mother had been German to explain the occasional accented word. He told his family that he was on a five-year mission to the Baikonur Cosmodrome, a top-secret facility that was home to the Soviet space program; he wrote dozens of letters to his family in advance that were mailed periodically from Baikonur.

Dittrich arrived in Chicago on 8 October 1978, flying in by way of Mexico, using a Canadian passport with the name William Dyson. The KGB provided him with Barsky's birth certificate and $6,000 in cash. His mission was to get a U.S. passport, insert himself into American society, to make contacts with foreign policy think tanks and "get close" to President Jimmy Carter's National Security Adviser Zbigniew Brzezinski in order to influence policy.

Dittrich rented an apartment in New York City and assumed the identity of Jack Barsky. His instructions had been to use the birth certificate to get a passport, but the process proved more difficult than the KGB had anticipated. He established his identity first by obtaining a membership card at the American Museum of Natural History, followed by a library card, a driver's license and finally a Social Security card. He worked as a bicycle messenger and began attending Baruch College, studying computer programming.

Barsky discovered that the people who trained him did not have an authentic understanding of Americans, and he struggled at first with his assignment. While his instructions were to infiltrate political circles and get close to Brzezinski, he was not given specific instructions on how he was supposed to accomplish that. He also learned that while his English was excellent, he was very pushy and argumentative when dealing with people. He was shocked when he was confronted with this fact by a fed-up friend. He realized that he was essentially too East German to fit in.

Barsky received weekly radio transmissions from the Soviets and at night spent hours decrypting messages. Photos and documents hidden in small canisters were delivered to the KGB via dead drops around New York. His assignments included tracking Nikolai Khokhlov, a Soviet defector living in California and a KGB spy gone rogue in Canada, and even writing an assessment of the American public's perception of the Soviet–Afghan War. Every two years, he went back to East Germany for three weeks of vacation and debriefing, always returning to the U.S. using fake passports. In 1984, he began working for MetLife and was able to provide the Soviets with programming code that helped their computer scientists keep up with the West.

Barsky noted that the Soviets in the 1980s were trying to recruit right-wing radicals as sources. He created profiles on potential right-wing recruits. However, Barsky never learned of the outcome of this effort as separate agents were responsible for the attempted recruitment. Barsky also stated, "Many a right-wing radical had given information to the Soviets under a 'false flag', thinking they were working with a Western ally, such as Israel, when in fact their contact was a KGB operative."

On Barsky's first trip back to East Germany in 1980, he was allowed to marry his girlfriend, an accepted practice as the KGB believed a married spy with a spouse back home would be less likely to defect. He married again in the United States in 1986 after a woman he was dating, who was an illegal immigrant from Guyana, needed help to get a green card. He initially married her as a favor, but after she got pregnant, he tried to make the marriage work. For several years, he led a double life, with a wife and son in East Germany and a wife and daughter in the United States. His two families did not know about each other. He later reflected that he kept his two identities separate in his mind. He told Der Spiegel in 2015, "I did a good job of separating the two. Barsky had nothing to do with Dittrich and Dittrich wasn't responsible for Barsky."

== Exit from espionage ==
In December 1988, while Barsky was living in Queens, the KGB apparently believed his cover had been compromised. He was alerted on his way to work when he saw a small splash of red paint on the subway platform. The red paint was a predefined signal of the highest emergency, ordering him to immediately report to the Soviet Embassy in Canada to return to East Germany. Concerned about the welfare of his infant daughter, Barsky decided he could not return. He ignored it for several months, until another KGB agent met him in the subway and quietly told him he needed to follow orders or he would wind up dead. He falsely told his handlers he had contracted HIV and needed to stay in the United States for treatment, relying on the KGB's fear of HIV/AIDS being spread in the Soviet Union. He promised them he would never defect. They either accepted his lie or were unable to extract him.

Meanwhile, the KGB reportedly told his German wife, who knew he was a spy, that he was dead. She reported him missing and then filed for divorce. His mother, who last saw him in 1986, truly believed he had gone missing in the Soviet Union. For years, she desperately searched for him, contacting the German embassies in Moscow and even writing to Soviet leader Mikhail Gorbachev. In 1996, investigators with the German Foreign Office determined that the story he had told his mother was a lie. The project in Baikonur that he had claimed to be working on for many years had ended in 1978. His mother was diagnosed with Parkinson's disease and died without knowing the truth.

In 1989, the Berlin Wall began coming down, followed by the collapse of the Soviet Union two years later. In 1992, a KGB defector to Great Britain named Vasili Mitrokhin provided information to MI6 about Soviet spy operations around the world, including the name "Barsky" in the United States.

The FBI located Barsky in 1994 and observed him for three years, bugging his house and even buying the home next to his in Pennsylvania. An FBI agent moved into the house next door and monitored Barsky's every movement to determine whether he was still an active agent in a sleeper cell. The FBI contacted the elderly parents of the real Jack Barsky, who had died as a child in 1955, out of fear they would happen to discover their dead son's identity had been stolen and would alert local authorities. Although upset, the Barskys agreed not to disclose the information.

The FBI investigation quickly escalated when one day in 1997, during a fight with his soon-to-be ex-wife being recorded by the FBI, Barsky confessed that he was actually a spy. Shortly after that, Barsky was pulled over by the police on his way home from work and taken into FBI custody. During interrogation, Barsky quickly confessed his real identity and that he had stopped spying in 1988. He shared his knowledge of KGB espionage training and the modus operandi of Russian sleeper agents. The FBI determined that he was no longer an active spy and found him to be a valuable source of information about spy techniques. He was never charged with any crime.

== Post-Cold War activities ==
Since his uncovering, Barsky has revealed the truth about his life and activities to his families, both in the United States and in Germany. He aided the FBI and the NSA, and in 2014 became a U.S. citizen. Dittrich continued to work in IT, and was the chief information officer for energy systems, and in 2011 joined the New York Independent System Operator as a Director of Software Technologies in upstate New York. He did not tell his employer about his past when he was hired, and he was fired in 2015 after he shared his story on 60 Minutes. It is unknown if the FBI helped him get the job at the grid, which has a very strict background check.

Dittrich released a book in 2017 about his experiences, Deep Undercover: My Secret Life and Tangled Allegiances as a KGB Spy in America.

Dittrich has appeared on CNN as an expert on espionage, commenting on Russian interference in the 2016 United States elections, and Ambassador Sergey Kislyak's interactions with Donald Trump's associates.

== Personal life ==
Barsky married three times. First, as Albrecht Dittrich, he married Gerlinde in East Germany, with whom he had a son, Matthias Dittrich, born in 1981. While living as Jack Barsky in the United States, he married Penelope, an immigrant from Guyana, when she became pregnant in 1986. They had a daughter, Chelsea, born 1987, followed by a son, Jessie. When his daughter (who now goes by Chelsea Dittrich) was 21, she began the search to find and meet her half-brother's family in Germany. Barsky became a Christian after meeting his third wife, Shawna, a devout Christian from Jamaica. For many years, she thought the story he had confided in her about once being a spy was a fantasy. He now has a good relationship with his eldest son, Matthias, and through him has a granddaughter, Marlena.

Barsky lived in Schaghticoke, New York until 2016. He now resides near Austin, Texas, and is separated from Shawna, and their daughter, Trinity, born in 2010. The FBI agent who lived next door and interrogated him after his detention became a close friend and godfather to Trinity.
