= Illegals Program =

Russian espionage program in the US uncovered in 2010

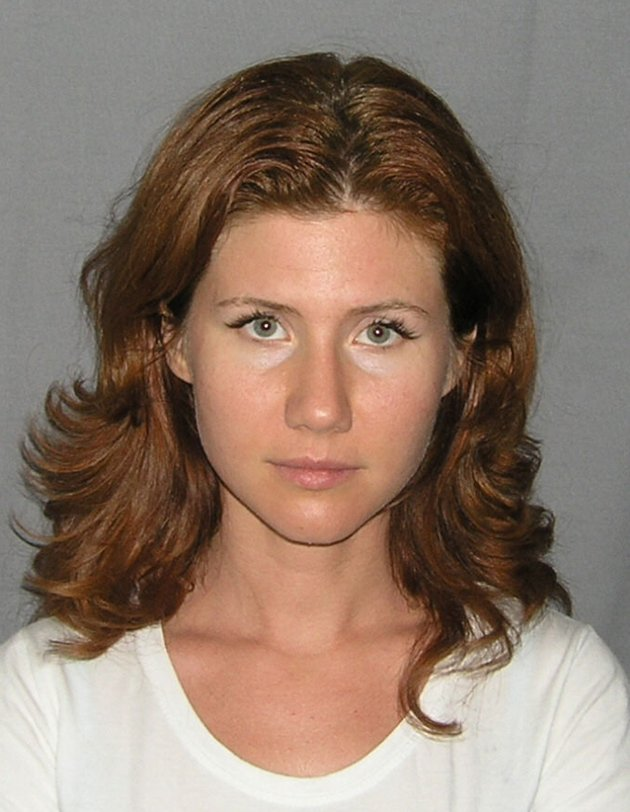
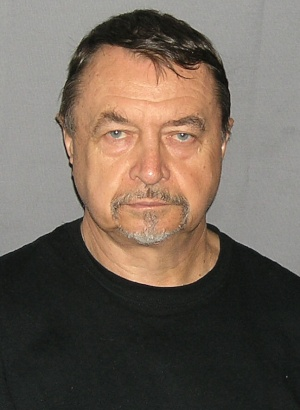
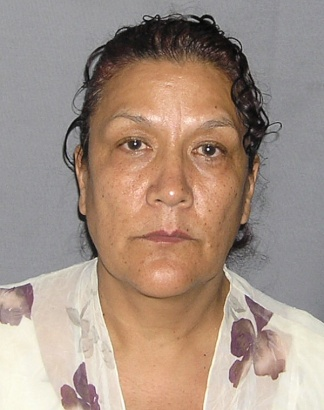
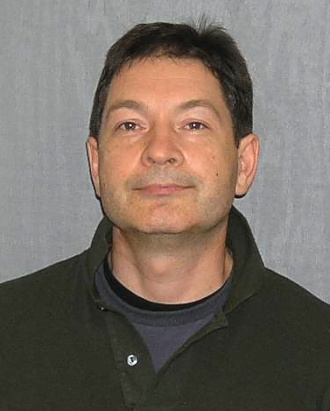
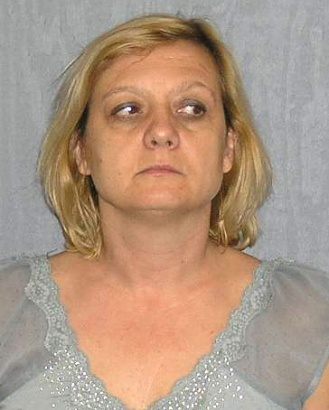
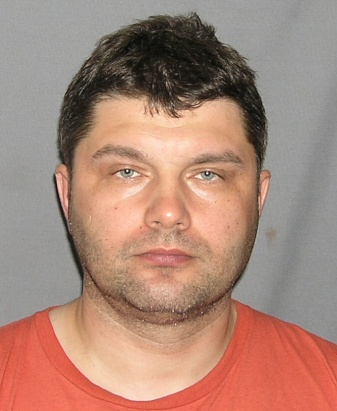
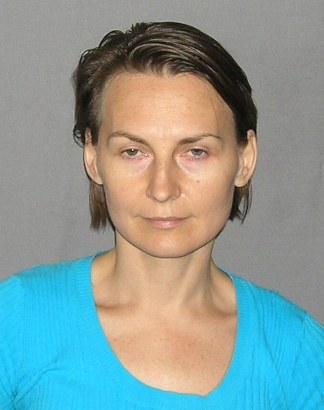
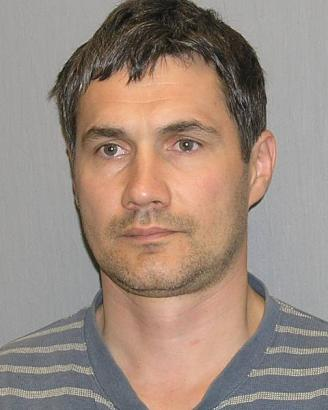
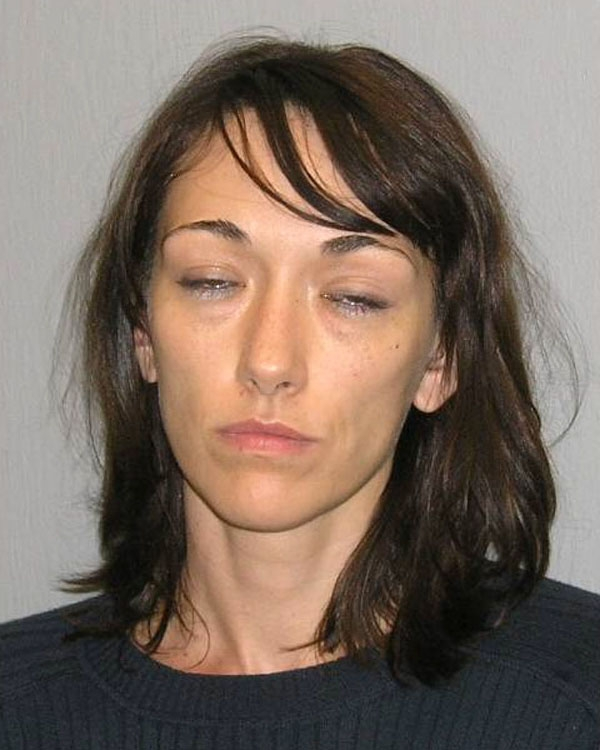
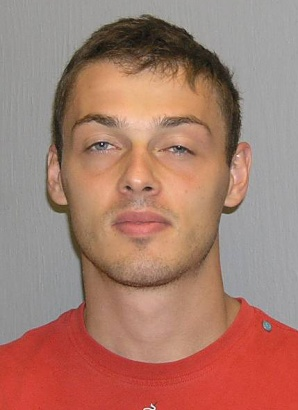
- Ten Russian agents apprehended on June 27, 2010

The Illegals Program (so named by the United States Department of Justice) was a network of Russian sleeper agents under unofficial cover. An investigation by the Federal Bureau of Investigation (FBI) culminated in the arrest of ten agents on June 27, 2010, and a prisoner exchange between Russia and the United States on July 9, 2010.

The arrested spies were Russian nationals who had been planted in the US by the Russian Foreign Intelligence Service (known by its Russian abbreviation, SVR), most of them using false identities. Posing as ordinary American citizens, they tried to build contacts with academics, industrialists, and policymakers to gain access to intelligence. They were the target of a multi-year investigation by the FBI. The investigation, called Operation Ghost Stories, culminated at the end of June 2010 with the arrest of ten people in the US and an eleventh in Cyprus. The ten sleeper agents were charged with "carrying out long-term, 'deep-cover' assignments in the United States on behalf of the Russian Federation."

The suspect arrested in Cyprus skipped bail the day after his arrest. A twelfth person, a Russian national who worked for Microsoft, was also apprehended about the same time and deported on July 13, 2010. Moscow court documents made public on June 27, 2011, revealed that another two Russian agents, who Russia alleges were known to the FBI, managed to flee the US without being arrested.

Ten of the agents were flown to Vienna on July 9, 2010, soon after pleading guilty to charges of failing to register as representatives of a foreign government. The same day, the agents were exchanged for four Russian nationals, three of whom had been convicted and imprisoned by Russia for espionage (high treason) on behalf of the US and UK.

On October 31, 2011, the FBI publicly released several dozen still images, clips from surveillance video, and documents related to its investigation in response to Freedom of Information Act requests.

== FBI arrests and criminal charges ==
Using forged documents, some of the spies assumed stolen identities of Americans, enrolled at American universities, and joined professional organizations as a means of further infiltrating government circles. Two of the individuals used the names of Richard and Cynthia Murphy and resided in Hoboken, New Jersey, in the mid-1990s, before purchasing a nearby home in suburban Montclair. Another couple named in court documents were journalist Vicky Peláez and Mikhail Vasenkov (using the alias Juan Lazaro) in Yonkers, New York. The court filings allege that couples were arranged in Russia to "co-habit in the country to which they are assigned", going as far as having children together to help maintain their deep covert status.

The criminal complaints later filed in various federal district courts allege that the Russian agents in the US passed information back to the SVR by messages hidden inside digital photographs, written in disappearing ink, ad hoc wireless networks, and shortwave radio transmissions, as well as by agents swapping identical bags while passing each other in the stairwell of a train station. Messages and materials were passed in such places as Grand Central Terminal and Central Park.

The Russian agents were tasked by "Moscow centre" to report about US policy in Central America, US interpretation of Russian foreign policy, problems with US military policy, and "United States policy with regard to the use of the Internet by terrorists".

According to the media reports, planning by the FBI to have the "illegals" arrested began in mid-June 2010, but the action was hastened reportedly by some members of the group intending to travel outside the US as well as by Anna Chapman's growing concern about having been exposed. Vladimir Guriyev was planning to travel to France and possibly Russia, Bezrukov was planning to travel outside the US with his son, and Chapman, in a telephone call to her father the day before the arrest, said she suspected that she may have been discovered and planned to leave for Moscow in mid-July 2010.

U.S. authorities arrested ten of the agents involved on June 27, 2010, in a series of raids in Boston, Montclair (New Jersey), Yonkers, and Northern Virginia. They charged the individuals with money laundering and failing to register as agents of a foreign government. No charges were made that the individuals involved gained access to classified material, though contacts were made with a former intelligence official and with a scientist involved in developing bunker buster bombs.

One of the suspects, using the name of Christopher R. Metsos, was detained on June 29, 2010, while attempting to depart from Cyprus for Budapest, but was released on bail and then disappeared.

There was no evidence that the convicted agents knew each other beyond their respective spouses; military analyst Pavel Felgenhauer believed that they consequently did not constitute a "spy ring".

Shortly after the arrests, The Guardian commented: "The FBI operation represents the biggest penetration of SVR communications in recent memory. The FBI read their emails, decrypted their intel, read the embedded coded texts on images posted on the net, bugged their mobile phones, videotaped the passing of bags of cash and messages in invisible ink from one agent to another, and hacked into their bogus expenses claims. ... The tradecraft used by the alleged SVR ring was amateurish, and will send shivers down the spine of the rival intelligence organisations in Russia. This was bungling on a truly epic scale. No secrets about bunker-busting bombs were actually obtained, but the network was betrayed. ... To have a spy ring uncovered before they could actually do any serious spying is doubly embarrassing."

Coinciding with the day of the prisoners' swap, the death of the prominent Russian defector Sergei Tretyakov, who died in the US on June 13, 2010, was reported on July 9, 2010. A Florida medical examiner's report, released on September 20, 2010, cited an accident and a tumour as the cause of death. In response to allegations in the media that he might have tipped off the U.S. authorities about some of the "illegals", Tretyakov's co-author Pete Earley, citing anonymous "well-informed" sources, said in July 2010 that Tretyakov had not been privy to the case of Russian "illegals".

The November 11, 2010, issue of span broadsheet Kommersant carried an article that, with reference to unnamed Russian government sources, contained allegations that the "illegals" were fingered by a senior SVR officer named "Colonel Shcherbakov" (according to an unnamed ex-CIA source, his full name may be Александр Васильевич Щербаков, Alexander Vasilievich Shcherbakov). The latter, according to the newspaper's sources, headed the "American" unit of the SVR department in charge of "illegals" and left Russia for the US "three days prior to Dmitry Medvedev's June visit to the U.S." According to other media outlets' sources, the name "Shcherbakov" was fictitious, and a number of experts and commentators judged many allegations in the article to be dubious or improbable. Nevertheless, some comments made the following day by Russian president Medvedev were interpreted as an indirect confirmation of a high-level defection in the Russian intelligence apparatus. On November 15, 2010, Interfax cited unnamed sources within Russian intelligence as alleging that the real name of the defector who was primarily responsible for uncovering the ten convicted agents was Aleksandr Poteyev (reportedly, his full name is Александр Николаевич Потеев, Aleksandr Nikolayevich Poteyev), who was a colonel in the SVR and was deputy head of the American department within Directorate "S" of SVR ("S" oversees illegals). According to Interfax's unnamed source, a person called Shcherbakov had indeed held a senior position in the SVR and "defected about two years ago".

== Agents apprehended by FBI on June 27, 2010 ==
=== Anna Chapman ===
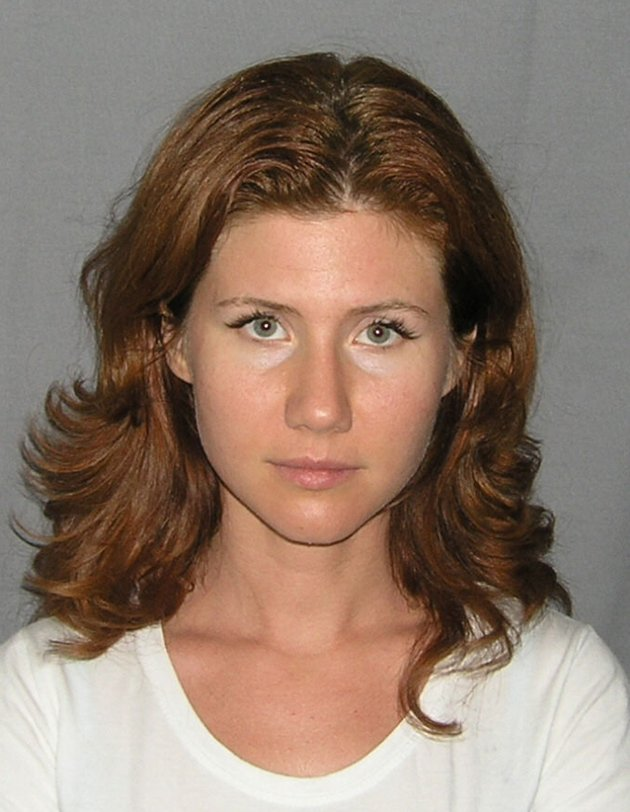
Anna Chapman

Anna Chapman and an undercover agent meet in a coffee shop in New York, June 26, 2010

Anna Chapman—maiden name Anna Vasil'evna Kushchenko (Russian: Анна Васильевна Кущенко)—was arrested with nine others in 2010. According to U.S. authorities, her former name is Anya Kushchenko, and she is a Volgograd native. (According to some reports, she was born in Ukraine.) Her father was employed in the Russian embassy in Nairobi, Kenya. She received her master's in economics degree from the Peoples' Friendship University of Russia in Moscow. She later worked in London at NetJets, Barclays Bank, and other companies.

On July 5, 2010, One India reported that Chapman may have been recruited to become an agent when she was in the United Kingdom, citing Oleg Gordievsky and Alex Chapman as sources, and that an urgent probe was underway in the UK to ascertain whether Chapman organized sleeper cells in the United Kingdom.

Her LinkedIn social networking site profile said she was CEO of PropertyFinder Ltd, a website selling real estate internationally. Chapman posted photos of herself on the Odnoklassniki ("Classmates") social networking website in Russia where she stated "Russia, Moscow. My favorite place on earth, my native capital!" She also posted photos and profiles on the Facebook and LinkedIn social networking websites.

Chapman's prior meetings with her Russian handlers were on Wednesdays; not face to face; solely to pass information via encrypted private computer networks at Barnes & Noble or at Starbucks. Thus her suspicion was aroused when an FBI informant, posing as a Russian consular officer named "Roman", on Saturday, June 26 asked her to come to New York from Connecticut, where she was spending the weekend. Her suspicions increased when "Roman" turned out to be a man she did not know who asked her to deliver a fake United States passport to another sleeper agent in a face-to-face meeting. The task of transferring a fake US passport to another Russian agent in a face-to-face meeting was beyond anything that the Moscow Center had previously assigned to her.

After the meeting with "Roman", Chapman bought a new cell phone and two telephone cards. She called her father in Moscow and another individual in New York, both advising her not to transfer the passport. The FBI monitored the calls.

Chapman turned in the passport to the 1st Precinct police station in New York but was questioned by the FBI and arrested.

According to her American lawyer, Robert Baum, while in the US jail, she feared she would be deported. When her deportation became imminent, she said she would go to live in London on her UK passport, but it was subsequently revoked. After her deportation to Russia, in July 2010, Robert Baum reiterated that his client wished to stay in the US. He also said that she was "particularly upset" by the revocation of her UK citizenship and exclusion from the country.

On August 8, 2010, the United Kingdom's tabloid Sunday Express cited an unidentified "source close to MI6" as saying, "There was a deal on the table just before she caught her connecting flight to Moscow. The secret service intercepted her on her flight back from America to Vienna, where her plane landed to refuel. MI6 were keen to know about other 'illegals'—Russian spy cells—hiding in the United Kingdom, so they made her an offer. In return they offered to give her back British citizenship and allow her to settle in London. Anna was having none of it though and told them in no uncertain terms that she wished to return to Russia."

In September 2010, German magazine Der Spiegel reported that Chapman said the SVR had forbidden her from saying anything about her activities in the US.

=== Mikhail Anatolyevich Vasenkov (Juan Lazaro) and Vicky Peláez ===
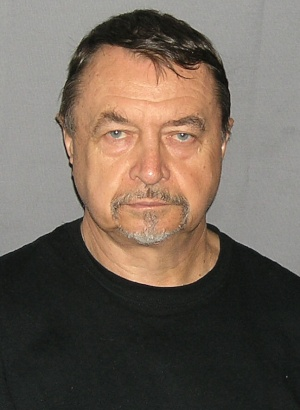
Mikhail A. Vasenkov
(Juan Lazaro)

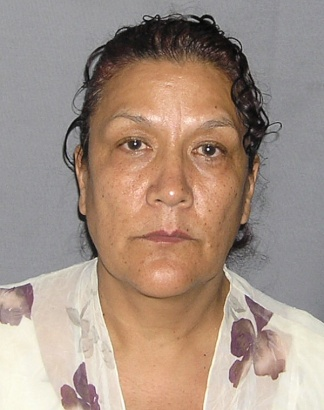
Vicky Peláez

Vicky Peláez, a Peruvian national and US citizen, and Mikhail Anatolyevich Vasenkov (Russian: Михаил Анатольевич Васенков, alias Juan Lazaro), a Russian citizen, were arrested at their home in Yonkers, New York. Both admitted being Russian agents. The couple have a son together, and Peláez also has a son from a previous marriage.

According to a report by The Wall Street Journal in early August 2010, the real Juan Lazaro died of respiratory failure in 1947 in Uruguay at age 3, with Vasenkov having presumably used the dead toddler's birth certificate to build a persona. According to a file kept by the Peruvian Interior Ministry that The Wall Street Journal cited, Vasenkov flew on March 13, 1976, from Madrid to Lima on a Uruguayan passport in the name of Juan Jose Lazaro Fuentes. He bore a letter on a Spanish tobacco company's stationery that said they had hired him for a market survey in Peru. Two years later, he submitted copies of the passport and a 1943 Uruguayan birth certificate with a letter asking Peru's military dictator Francisco Morales Bermúdez (the country was then run by a US-friendly junta) for Peruvian citizenship, which Peru granted in 1979.

In 1983, "Juan Lazaro" married Vicky Peláez. Peláez was a television reporter in Peru, and a columnist at El Diario La Prensa in New York City. In her writings, Peláez often criticized US policy in Latin America, and supported liberation movements in those countries. In 1985, Peláez and "Lazaro" moved to New York with her son from a previous relationship.

"Juan Lazaro" wrote a 1990 article for a European publication that spoke "glowingly" of the Shining Path guerrilla movement. He was described as a "journalist and anthropologist" in the 1998 book Women and Revolution: Global Expression, for which he was a contributing author. Vasenkov studied at the New School for Social Research and taught a class on Latin American and Caribbean Politics at Baruch College for one semester during the 2008–2009 school year as an adjunct professor. According to The New York Times June 29, 2010, report, Vasenkov was a vocal opponent of American foreign policy in class: "He maintained that the wars in Iraq and Afghanistan were a money-making ploy for corporate America. He praised President Hugo Chávez of Venezuela and disparaged President Álvaro Uribe of Colombia as a pawn for paramilitary groups that have broad control over drug trafficking." At least one student complained about Vasenkov's teaching and he was let go at the end of the semester. The department chairman reported that Vasenkov's instruction was not up to standard, resulting in his teaching for only one semester, but that he recalled no controversy over any anti-American views.

US officials reported that on June 27, 2010, Vasenkov confessed to being a spy and that "Juan Lazaro" was not his real name, though he declined to give his true identity. He additionally stated he was not born in Uruguay, and that Peláez delivered letters to Russian authorities on his behalf. It was later reported that Lazaro's real name is Mikhail Vasenkov. In November 2010, Russian broadsheet Kommersant published Russian anonymous sources' allegations that while in US custody, Vasenkov had three ribs and a leg broken by investigators trying to extract more information from him—a claim assessed by experts as highly improbable. The Kommersant article also cited unnamed Russian government sources as saying that Vasenkov was presented with the SVR personal file on him obtained through a senior SVR defector ("Colonel Shcherbakov"), whereafter he was forced to own up to his real name.

On August 7, 2010, The Wall Street Journal cited Vasenkov's American lawyer, Genesis Peduto, as saying that his client indicated to him on the phone that he wanted to leave Moscow for Peru: "He doesn't want to stay in Russia. He says he's Juan Lazaro and he's not from Russia and doesn't speak Russian. He wants to be where his wife is going, to her native country, where it will be easier for Juan Jr. to visit. His family comes first." In December 2013, Vicky Pelaez left Russia and returned home to Peru; Vasenkov moved there in January 2014.

Vasenkov died in April 2022.

=== Andrey Bezrukov and Yelena Vavilova (Donald Heathfield and Tracey Lee Ann Foley) ===
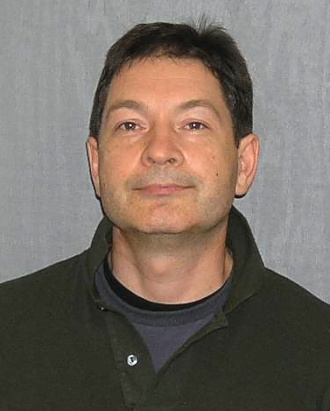
Andrey Bezrukov
(Donald Heathfield)

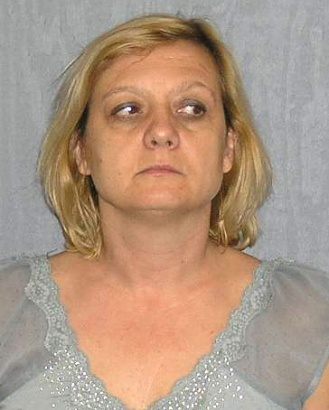
Yelena Vavilova
(Tracey Lee Ann Foley)

Andrey Bezrukov (Russian: Андрей Безруков, alias Donald Howard Heathfield) and Yelena Vavilova (Russian: Елена Вавилова, alias Tracey Lee Ann Foley) admitted being both Russian citizens and Russian agents. They used Canadian identities stolen for them by the KGB, and lived in Canada for several years.

When arrested, Bezrukov and his cover wife Yelena Vavilova had a home in Cambridge, Massachusetts. Heathfield had earned an M.P.A. degree from the John F. Kennedy School of Government at Harvard University, where he was described as a "joiner". Heathfield claimed to have been the son of a Canadian diplomat and to have studied at a school in the Czech Republic. A fellow graduate of the Kennedy School noted that Heathfield kept careful track of his nearly 200 classmates, who included President of Mexico Felipe Calderón. The couple were arrested on June 27, 2010.

On July 16, 2010, after his arrest and deportation, Harvard revoked Heathfield's degree on grounds of his misrepresentation of his identity on his application.

Bezrukov was a professional member of the World Future Society, described by the Boston Herald as "a think tank on future technologies that holds conferences featuring top government scientists". Leon Fuerth, a former national security advisor to US Vice President Al Gore, spoke at the World Future Society 2008 conference in Washington, D.C., along with George Washington University professor William Halal. In a July 2, 2010, Wall Street Journal article, Fuerth is quoted acknowledging he met Heathfield after a speech he gave. In the same article, Halal described his relationship to Heathfield as benign; "I would bump into him at meetings of Federal agencies, think tanks, and the World Future Society. I have no information that's of any security value… Everything I gave Don was published widely and readily available on the Internet". Bezrukov was chief executive of Future Map, a consulting company involved in government and corporate preparedness systems.

Bezrukov's cover wife, Yelena Vavilova (as Tracy Foley), worked for Redfin, a real estate firm in Somerville, Massachusetts. She claimed she was from Canada, but also traveled on a British passport.

The agents have two sons, Alexander and Timothy, who were, at the time of their parents' arrest, aged 16 and 20. The sons said they had no inkling of their parents' real identities. However, US officials claimed the parents had revealed their true identities to the elder son long before the arrest. In July 2012, referring to "current and former U.S. officials", The Wall Street Journal reported that the couple had groomed their son, Tim Foley, for a future spy career. He was 20 when his parents were arrested, and had just finished his second year at George Washington University in Washington, D.C. He and his younger brother traveled to Russia in July 2010 to meet their parents after their deportations. Both were unable to return to the US. The sons, while born in Canada and considering themselves Canadian, and not feeling at home in Moscow, were unable to regain their Canadian citizenship, and were denied visas for Canada, France, and the United Kingdom. They were consequently unable to take up university places they were offered. By 2018, both sons had won court cases in the Federal Court of Appeal to affirm their Canadian citizenship; the ruling was affirmed by the Supreme Court of Canada on December 19, 2019. The decision, Canada (Minister of Citizenship and Immigration) v Vavilov, set an important administrative law precedent. In March 2018, Alexander (going by his mother's surname of Vavilov) received a Canadian passport and moved back to Canada, while awaiting the Supreme Court verdict.

The FBI lead agent against the spy couple was Peter Strzok.

As of August 2019, the couple was living in Moscow; Bezrukov was teaching at a university and doing consulting work for an oil company while Vavilova "also has a consultancy role at a company", according to an article published by The Guardian. According to her website, she has also published two novels.

=== Vladimir and Lidiya Guryev (Richard and Cynthia Murphy) ===
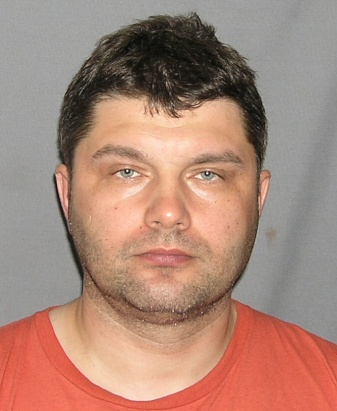
Vladimir Guryev
(Richard Murphy)

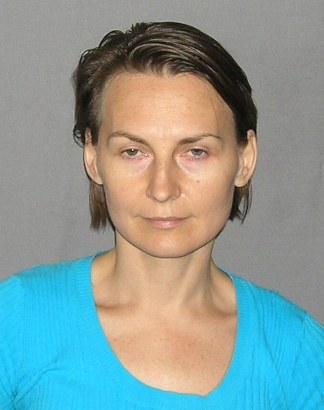
Lidiya Guryeva
(Cynthia Murphy)

Vladimir Guryev (Russian: Владимир Гурьев, alias Richard Murphy) and Lidiya Guriyeva (Russian: Лидия Гурьева, alias Cynthia Murphy) were Russian agents in New Jersey.

Lidiya Guriyeva attended school in the United States, receiving two undergraduate degrees from New York University and an MBA from Columbia Business School. In 2009, Cynthia Murphy developed contacts in New York City financial circles as a means to obtain details about the global gold market. Lidiya was trying to cultivate a relationship with Alan Patricof, a venture capitalist who co-chaired Hillary Clinton's 2008 presidential bid, with her handlers telling her to "try to build up relations little by little". Lidiya Guriyeva was Vice President of Morea Financial Services in New York.

Vladimir Guryev supplied money and equipment to Kutsik (see below) in a 2004 meeting in Columbus Circle, New York and 2009, where $150,000 and a flash drive were given. When the computer program was inoperative, Guryev supplied Kutsik with a laptop computer that Guryev brought from Moscow.

Vladimir and Lidiya Guriyeva were arrested at their home at 31 Marquette Road in Montclair, New Jersey. The couple have two young daughters, aged 11 and 9 at the time of their parents' arrest. Vladimir Guriyev used a false birth certificate that claimed he was born in Philadelphia, while his wife said that she was born in New York City as "Cynthia A. Hopkins". The two earlier lived in an apartment in Hoboken, New Jersey, after arriving in the United States in the mid-1990s. They then purchased a suburban Montclair home for $481,000 in 2008. When they purchased it, the couple argued with their handlers as to who would officially own the house, with the ultimate decision being that it would be owned by "Moscow Center".

Professor Nina Khrushcheva, who served as Vladimir's faculty adviser at The New School for three years starting in 2002, said in July 2010 that she found it difficult to figure out the purported Philadelphia native: "I was always puzzled by the inconsistency between a completely American name and completely Russian behaviour. ... He had a thick Russian accent and an incredibly unhappy Russian personality."

Vladimir Guryev was criticized by his wife for his poor information gathering; she suggested that he pursue individuals with connections to the White House. The couple was also tasked with obtaining information about US policy in Afghanistan, the nuclear program of Iran, and the latest Strategic Arms Reduction Treaty talks. Shortly after the couple's arrest, one of their neighbors quipped: "They couldn't be spies. Look what she did with the hydrangeas."

=== Mikhail Kutsik and Nataliya Pereverzeva (Michael Zottoli and Patricia Mills) ===
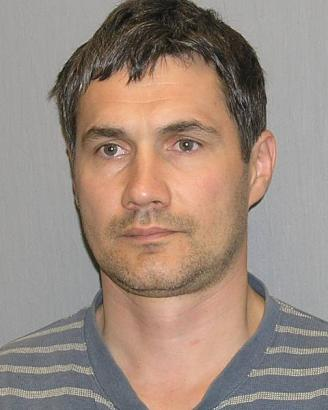
Mikhail Kutsik
(Michael Zottoli)

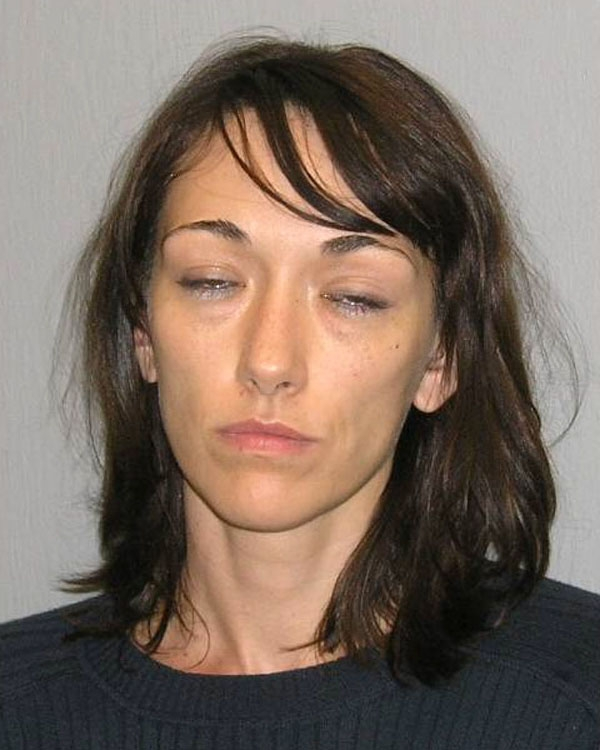
Nataliya Pereverzeva
(Patricia Mills)

Mikhail Kutsik (Russian: Михаил Куцик; cover name Michael Zottoli) and Natalya Pereverzeva (Russian: Наталья Переверзева; cover name Patricia Mills) were agents in Seattle, Washington, and, later, Arlington, Virginia. They appear to be in their 40s. Kutsik came to the US in 2001, and Pereverzeva came in 2003, according to the FBI. He claimed to be American but had a thick accent and she claimed to be Canadian but neighbors said she sounded Yugoslavian. They lived in the Seattle, Washington, area for about two years and both attended the University of Washington, Bothell, where they earned bachelor's degrees in business. Zottoli worked for several different jobs over the years including telecom company accountant, car salesman, and teleconference firm employee. Pereverzeva was a stay-at-home mom who cared for their toddler son named Kenny; a second son was born in late 2009. After Kutsik lost his job in 2009, they moved with their children to Arlington, Virginia, later that year. After their parents were arrested, arrangements were made to send the children to Russia.

Kutsik and Pereverzeva pleaded guilty to "conspiring to act as an unregistered agent of a foreign country". They appeared to be an ordinary married couple with two young children. However, U.S. authorities allege that they had both been spying for Russia in the US since at least 2004. They received specially coded radio transmissions at their high-rise Seattle apartment, and the FBI secretly entered their home, where they found one time pads used to decode the "radiograms". Kutsik received money from Guriyev (Murphy) in Columbus Circle, New York in 2004 while Pereverzeva stood as lookout. In 2006, the FBI photographed them visiting the area of Wurtsboro, New York, where they dug up a bundle of cash in a field that Metsos placed there two years earlier. Kutsik visited New York again in 2009, where he evidently received $150,000 in cash and a flash drive from Murphy. Kutsik communicated with the SVR using a laptop that Guryev brought from Moscow after the computer program supplied to him did not function.

Kutsik and Pereverzeva were arrested on June 27, 2010, at their Arlington, Virginia, home. Both had family living in Russia and prosecutors argued that bail be denied under the circumstances.

On January 13, 2011, Russia's oil pipeline monopoly, Transneft, confirmed that Natalya Pereverzeva was appointed an adviser for foreign economic relations to the company's president, Nikolai Tokarev.

=== Mikhail Semenko ===
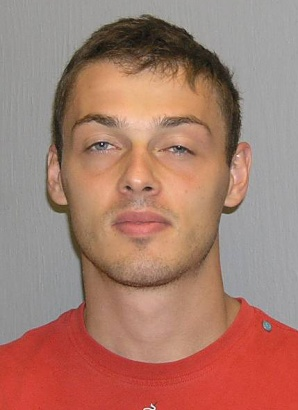
Mikhail Semenko

Mikhail Semenko (Russian: Михаил Семенко) was one of the two agents who "operated under their true names". He is reported to have studied for one year at the Harbin Institute of Technology. He also attended school and received graduate degrees in the United States at Seton Hall University, one of the degrees being from the Whitehead School of Diplomacy. He is fluent in English, Mandarin, Russian, and Spanish. He later worked for the Conference Board in New York City in 2009, and for 2009–2010 reportedly worked at Travel All Russia, an Arlington, Virginia, travel agency, helping Chinese and Hispanic travelers plan trips. He appeared to be in his late 20s; his neighbors said that he was a stylish man who drove a Mercedes S500 car and spoke Russian to his girlfriend.

Semenko was first noted by the FBI on June 5 when he used a computer in a restaurant to send encrypted messages, presumably to a car parked in the restaurant lot that had Russian diplomatic plates and was driven by a Russian official who was known to have transferred money to other Russian sleeper agents in 2004.

On or about June 26, 2010, Semenko met with an undercover FBI agent purporting to be a Russian agent and accepted $5,000, which he delivered to a drop site in an Arlington, Virginia park. The drop was made at 11:06 a.m. and Semenko was arrested at his residence in Arlington, Virginia, a suburb of Washington, DC, later that day.

== Other presumed agents of the Illegals Program ==
=== "Christopher Metsos" (Pavel Kapustin) ===
The man known by the name of "Christopher Metsos" was alleged to be the money man and main go-between behind the Illegals Program and the SVR.

On June 29, 2010, acting on an Interpol notice, police arrested the 55-year-old man at the Larnaca International Airport in Cyprus as he was about to board a jet for Budapest. He was released after posting €27,000 (equivalent to US$33,777) bail and told to report to a police station thereafter but skipped out and apparently fled the country.

According to the information from U.S. authorities shortly after his flight, "Metsos", who traveled on a Canadian passport and claimed to be Canadian, regularly traveled to the US to deliver money to his fellow Russian spies; he would typically drop off money at New York City area locations including a coffee shop, restaurant and subway station. According to his Cypriot lawyer, "Metsos" had no discernible Russian accent and described himself as a Canadian resident who divorced 15 years prior and had a son living in Paris.

On July 26, 2010, it was reported by the media that Passport Canada, upon conducting a review, revoked the travel document issued to Christopher Metsos.

A court verdict read in Moscow on June 27, 2011, identified "Metsos" as Pavel Kapustin (Павел Капустин), a Russian espionage professional, who was exfiltrated upon being released on bail in Cyprus.

=== Alexey Karetnikov ===
On July 13, 2010, the US government disclosed that a 12th, previously undisclosed, person was being held in custody and was said by the media to be implicated in the same federal probe. Later that day, the person was identified as Alexey Karetnikov, a 23-year-old former entry-level software tester at Microsoft, who was apprehended on June 28, 2010, in Seattle. He was charged with immigration violations and consented to deportation in lieu of further court proceedings; he was sent to Russia on July 13, 2010. Law enforcement officials said on the day of his deportation that Karetnikov had no direct ties to the other deported persons, although his name came up in the broader investigation.

On July 22, 2010, Newsweek published the comments of Karetnikov's fellow dormitory resident, who said that Karetnikov impressed him as "very oily" and "very Russian"; according to the anonymous source, Karetnikov spoke surprisingly poor English but was "sophisticated" and knew a lot about Microsoft.

== Communication techniques ==
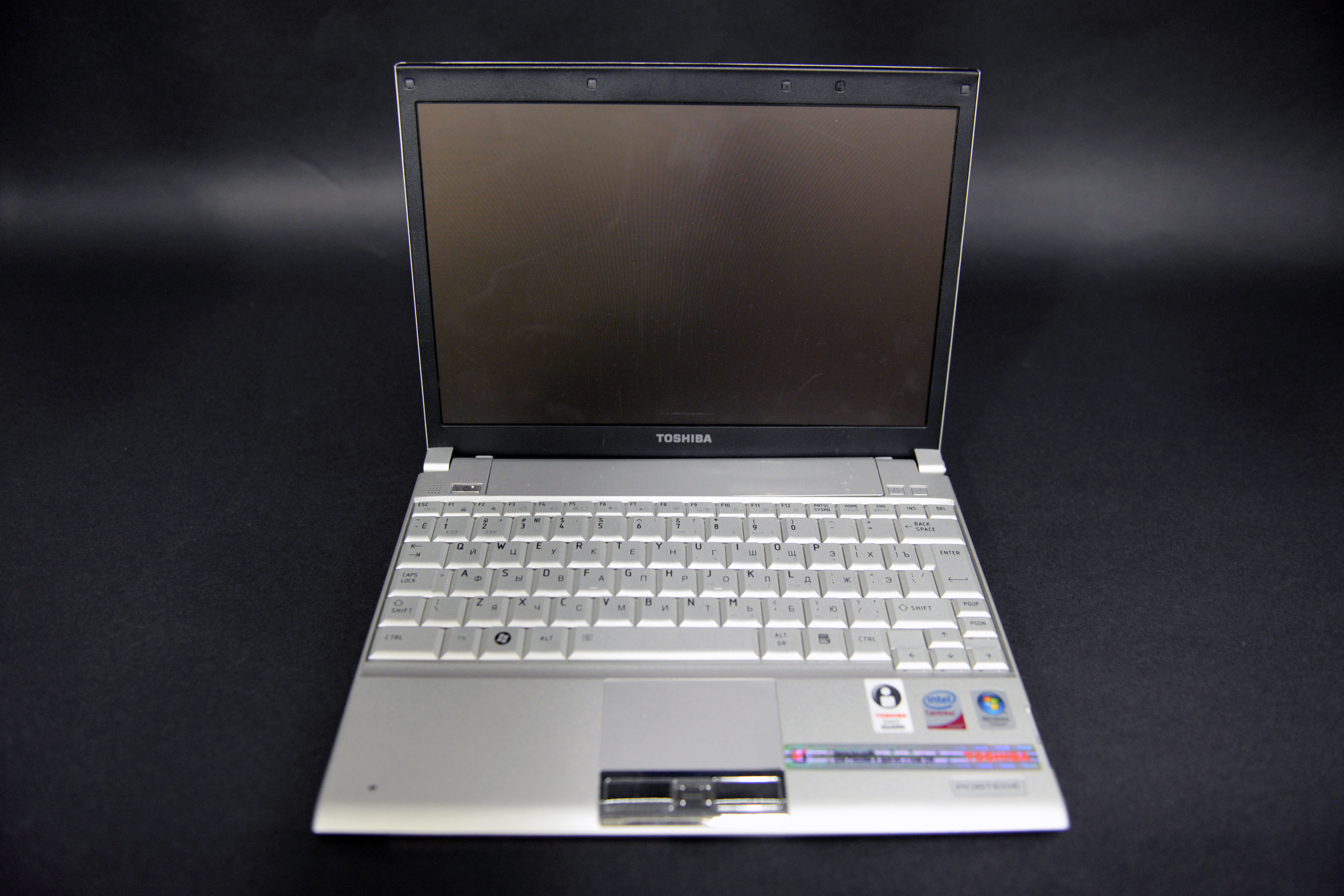
Anna Chapman's laptop seized by the FBI

The Russian agents used private Wi-Fi networks, flash memory sticks and text messages concealed in graphical images to exchange information. Custom steganographic software developed in Moscow was used where concealed messages were inserted into otherwise innocuous files. This program was initiated by using the Control-Alt-E keys and entering a 27-character password, which the FBI found written down. Coded bursts of data sent by a short wave radio transmitter were also used. Other methods included employing invisible ink and exchanging identical bags in public places.

In January 2010, Anna Chapman used her laptop at a New York coffee shop on 47th Street to electronically transfer data to a Russian official driving by. Two months later, Chapman used a private Wi-Fi network, possibly at a Barnes & Noble store on Greenwich Street in New York, to communicate with the same Russian official, who was nearby. Chapman used a range extender for her laptop.

== Court proceedings ==
On June 27, 2010, FBI Special Agent Amit Kachhia-Patel submitted a sealed complaint alleging a violation of Title 18, United States Code, section 951 (conspiracy to act as unregistered agents of a foreign government). An arrest warrant was issued for Anna Chapman and Mikhail Semenko by Magistrate Judge Ronald L. Ellis.

As of July 6, 2010, The New York Times reported that federal and local prosecutors were seeking a rapid conclusion to the case, to avoid a trial that might disclose sensitive information about information-gathering techniques. The proposed deal would have the defendants deported to Russia after pleading guilty to lesser charges.

On the morning of July 7, Reuters Moscow correspondent Guy Faulconbridge broke the news of the spy swap. He reported that Igor Sutyagin—jailed in 2004 for passing secrets to a British company that Russian prosecutors said was a front for the CIA—was to be swapped as part of a deal with the United States to bring home the Russian agents.

In a hearing held in federal court in Manhattan on July 8, 2010, before Judge Kimba Wood, all ten defendants pleaded guilty to a single charge each of secretly conspiring to act as agents of the Russian government. While the charge could carry up to five years in prison, The Washington Post described the pleas as a first step in what could be the largest prisoner swap between the United States and Russia since the days of the Cold War. Under the plea agreements, the defendants also disclosed their true identities and all except for Vicky Peláez admitted that they were Russian citizens.

On July 9, 2010, Attorney General Eric Holder said none of the ten defendants passed classified information and therefore none were charged with espionage.

All the defendants were sentenced to time already served. According to The New York Times, political leaders of the two nations made the deal even before the indictment—with US prosecutors and the defendants' lawyers playing a minimal role.

== Prisoner exchange ==
Reuters reported on July 7–8, 2010, that the US and Russia reached a deal under which the ten individuals arrested in that country as part of the Illegals Program would be deported to Russia in exchange for individuals who Russia convicted of espionage on behalf of the US and UK. Igor Sutyagin, Alexander Zaporozhsky, Sergei Skripal and Gennadiy Vasilenko were included in the exchange. All four served a considerable time in Russian prisons; at least three of the jailed individuals in Russia were convicted of spying for either the United Kingdom or the US.

White House Chief of Staff Rahm Emanuel reportedly said on July 8 that President Barack Obama approved the swap deal. An administration official was quoted as saying that Obama had not spoken to Russian President Dmitry Medvedev about the spy swap but was "fully briefed and engaged in the matter". Broad agreement in the US was reported to exist that the agents were being deported swiftly as neither government wanted the case to damage attempts to reset their relationship.

Shortly before the swap deal was reached, nuclear specialist Igor Sutyagin, one of the Russian prisoners included in the deal, was moved to a Moscow prison from a facility near the Arctic Circle and then flown to Vienna as part of the exchange.

Under a US–Russian agreement, the Russian government agreed to release the Russian prisoners and their family members for resettlement. The Russian prisoners had served a number of years in prison and some were in poor health.

On July 9, all ten suspects were deported. A government-chartered jet from Vision Airlines left New York's LaGuardia Airport and flew to Vienna International Airport via Bangor, Maine for refueling and then for the swap around midday of July 9 (local time). Returning from Vienna were the four Russian prisoners—Sutyagin, Zaporozhsky, Skripal, and Vasilenko. The aircraft landed at RAF Brize Norton in Oxfordshire, England, to drop two of the exchanged Russian nationals and proceeded to Washington Dulles International Airport on the afternoon of July 9. The Russian government Yakovlev Yak-42 jet returned to Moscow's Domodedovo airport where, after landing, the ten spies were kept away from local and international press.

Later that day the Russian ministry of Foreign Affairs confirmed the exchange of four convicted people for ten Russian citizens citing "humanitarian considerations and constructive partnership development".

== Prisoners held by Russia involved in the exchange ==
=== Igor Sutyagin ===
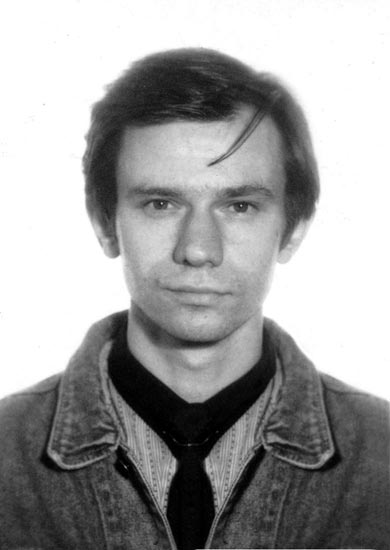
Igor Sutyagin in the 1990s

Igor Sutyagin was an arms control researcher with the Institute for US and Canadian Studies (ISKAN) of the Russian Academy of Sciences. He was arrested in 1999, and sentenced in April 2004 to 15 years' hard labor on high treason charges. He collected open-source data on Russian nuclear submarines and missile warning systems, analysed and provided it to a British consulting firm. He steadfastly denied using any classified information and ISKAN is said to have no access to Russian classified materials. Sutyagin maintained his innocence throughout his trial and conviction, but had to plead guilty shortly before the swap to qualify for a Presidential pardon. The US Department of State (and Amnesty International) classified Sutyagin as a political prisoner, not a spy. The Washington Post commented that Sutyagin's case differed from the other released prisoners, and that his original arrest might have been to warn Russians not to cooperate with Western companies and think tanks.

According to his relatives, Sutyagin phoned home on his arrival in the UK, saying that he was placed in an undisclosed location in a London suburb and that British authorities were in the process of granting him a UK visa. Later his lawyer confirmed that Sutyagin was granted leave to remain in the UK.

=== Sergei Skripal ===
Sergei Skripal was a colonel in Russia's Military Intelligence Service (GRU), who was arrested and convicted of high treason in Russia in 2006, and sentenced to 13 years in prison. According to the prosecution, he had spied for the United Kingdom's MI6 as a double agent. After the prisoner exchange in 2010, he moved to the UK and in 2018 Skripal and his daughter Yulia were poisoned with a nerve agent in Salisbury, England. A responding police officer and two random passersby (one of whom was the only death of the five poisoned) who found the discarded bottle were accidentally poisoned as well.

=== Aleksandr Zaporozhsky ===
Alexander Zaporozhsky was an operative in Russia's Foreign Intelligence Service. He was sentenced in 2003 to 18 years for secret cooperation with the United States. He was released as part of the swap after serving seven years.

=== Gennady Vasilenko ===
Gennady Semyonovich Vasilenko (Russian: Геннадий Семёнович Василенко) is the only person swapped from the Russian side who was not convicted on espionage (high treason) charges. He was a KGB officer who worked for external intelligence and counter-intelligence departments during the 1970s and 1980s. In 1988, presumably having been fingered by a Russian mole in the FBI, Robert Hanssen, he fell under suspicion of being a double agent. Vasilenko was not convicted but instead sacked from the KGB. He was arrested in 2005 and charged with an attempted murder. Due to lack of evidence this charge was dropped. Instead, he was sentenced to three years for possession of illegal firearms and explosive materials. In 2009, Vasilenko was convicted and sentenced again for allegedly trying to bribe facility officials.

According to media reports (which cite anonymous sources in Russian intelligence), Vasilenko was included in the list for the swap due to a personal request from a CIA officer who knew Vasilenko when he was posted in the US under diplomatic cover from 1976 to 1981.

=== Others held by Russia ===
Alexander Sypachev (Russian: Александр Сыпачев) was a colonel in the Russian intelligence service who was arrested after delivering a report to a secret location in 2002. He was sentenced to eight years for spying for the CIA. He was reported to have been considered for a swap but was not among the four Russians released.

Six others were considered for exchange as an even 11:11 swap, but were not exchanged in Vienna.

== Political ramifications ==
While there was speculation that the arrests of the alleged spies, which occurred barely 72 hours after President Medvedev's White House visit, might cast a shadow over President Barack Obama's effort to improve relations between the US and Russia, on June 30, 2010, the US administration said that it would not expel Russian diplomats and it expressed no indignation that Russia had apparently been caught spying on it.

On June 29, 2010, The Guardian's comment said: "Revelations about spy rings are the last thing a politician like Medvedev, who presents himself as a moderniser, needs"; in its July 1, 2010, issue, The Economist wrote: "The revelations have caused embarrassment in Moscow, not so much because Russia was caught spying on America, but because it did it so clumsily. Old KGB spies this week lamented the decline in professional standards. But the scandal has rather more serious domestic implications too. It punctures the mystique that helped allow the security services to gain such clout under Vladimir Putin, Russia's former president and present prime minister and a former KGB spy. The story discredits him and his circle of siloviki, the former and present members of the security services. Being laughed at is worse than being feared."

On February 1, 2011, Ireland's cabinet made a decision to expel a Russian diplomat from the country—the first time since 1983, after the Irish government, based on an investigation conducted by the Garda Síochána Special Detective Unit (SDU), concluded that the Russian security agent based at the Russian embassy in Rathgar gathered details from six genuine Irish passports that were then effectively cloned in Russia for the US-based spies. Ireland's Department of Foreign Affairs said, "The Government, by today's action, has once again made clear that it will not tolerate the fabrication and use of forged Irish passports by agents of a foreign State." On February 4, 2011, the Irish press identified the expelled diplomat as Alexander Smirnov, first secretary in the Russian embassy's consular section. On February 2, 2011, Russia threatened retaliation.

== Aftermath of the swap ==
After the Russian agents were returned to Russia, they were delivered to the SVR headquarters. They were not technically arrested, and relatives could visit them. However, they were not allowed to leave the facility until after the debriefing process, which took several weeks, as the Russian authorities appeared to suspect that betrayal—by any of the agents themselves or not—could be a plausible explanation for their exposure.

According to her lawyer, Vicky Peláez was placed in a Moscow apartment provided by Russian authorities. She turned down a US$2,000 per month offer from the Russian government and planned to return to Peru.

On June 28, 2010, the UK revoked Anna Chapman's UK citizenship.

On July 13, 2010, Russian intelligence sources were quoted as saying that the deported Russian agents would undergo a rigorous series of tests, including a lie detector, to establish whether any of them acted as a double agent.

The spy affair attracted media attention, including Chapman being described as "glamorous" and US Vice President Joe Biden joking shortly after the swap on a television chat show to comedian Jay Leno when asked "Do we have any spies that hot?" by saying "Let me be clear. It wasn't my idea to send her back." Joe Biden also said of the Russian agents: "And the ten, they've been here a long time, but they hadn't done much."

In July 2010, while visiting Crimea in Ukraine, Russian prime minister Vladimir Putin told reporters, without specifying the date, that he had had a meeting with the agents, specifically acknowledging that Chapman was among them; he said that they had had "a tough life" and been turned in as a result of "betrayal"; he also sang with the agents to live music some songs, including "From Where the Motherland Begins" (What the Motherland Begins With or What Does the Motherland Start With). Putin declined to evaluate their work saying that it was not up to him to evaluate but up to specialists and the "ultimate consumers of the information of such type, the Supreme Commander—the president of the Russian Federation."

The defector and former GRU agent, Viktor Suvorov, was scornful of both the agents and the agencies that sent them.

In mid-August 2010, Sir Stephen Lander, former Director-General of MI5 (1996–2002), voiced an opinion that the very existence of a ring of Russian "illegals" was no laughing matter: "The fact that they're nondescript or don't look serious is part of the charm of the business. That's why the Russians are so successful at some of this stuff. They're able to put people in those positions over time to build up their cover to be useful. They are part of a machine. …And the machine is a very professional and serious one."

In October 2010, Russian President Dmitry Medvedev recognized those "intelligence agents who worked in the United States and returned to Russia in July" together with other members of the Russian SVR for their service to the motherland in ceremonies held at the Kremlin.

In November 2010, an unidentified Kremlin official told Kommersant that an assassination plan for the alleged defector "Colonel Shcherbakov" was already in the works: "We know who he is and where he is." The source added that "a Mercader" was sent after Shcherbakov—a reference to assassin Ramón Mercader who murdered Leon Trotsky in Mexico with an ice axe in 1940. The newspaper article's author later said that the statement could have been made in jest ("spy humour"). On November 13, 2010, US intelligence analyst David Wise suggested that, assuming Shcherbakov was in the US, he must be under FBI protection.

In November 2010, the Interfax news agency cited an unidentified "Russian intelligence source" as saying that "Colonel Alexander Poteyev, a former deputy head of the U.S. division of Directorate S (illegal intelligence) within the SVR" was the subject of both internal and criminal investigations, with the criminal case likely to have been opened as per Article 275 of the RF Criminal Code (high treason). Poteyev's identity (full name: Александр Николаевич Потеев, Aleksandr Nikolayevich Poteyev) was confirmed by other ex-KGB and ex-SVR sources. The revelations in the Russian media about the 'treachery' within the SVR were seen by commentators as a sign of an ongoing struggle within the RF top bureaucracy for control over the administratively autonomous agency that had been part of the USSR KGB.

On December 1, 2010, commentator and researcher Bill Gertz quoted a "former intelligence official close to the National Security Agency" (NSA) as saying that the FBI and the NSA were conducting a counterintelligence probe at the NSA headquarters at Fort Meade, Maryland, in a top-secret hunt for a Russian agent, believing that the spy ring was likely acting as conduits for information coming from "one or more Russian spies that NSA is convinced reside at Fort Meade and possibly other DoD offices, like DIA". Bill Gertz's report prompted the Russian intelligence expert Andrei Soldatov to question the quasi-official version about Poteyev's responsibility. In a Larry King Live interview, aired by CNN about the same time, Russian prime minister Putin maintained that the Russian agents "deserved unconditional respect"; according to him, no harm had been done to US interests, and that they would only become operational "in crisis periods, say, in case of a breakup of the diplomatic relations."

On December 16, 2010, prime minister Putin, when answering the question during a televised call-in show about whether he ever signed assassination orders, said that hit squads had long been abolished in Russia; speaking specifically of the turncoat allegedly responsible for exposing the ten sleeper agents, he denounced him as a "brute" and a "pig" saying that "the traitors will croak all by themselves", adding that a traitor's life is miserable and regrettable.

On May 3, 2011, in Moscow, Alexander Poteyev was indicted on high treason and desertion charges and later put on trial in absentia. On June 27, 2011, he was found guilty in absentia on both charges and sentenced to 25 years of imprisonment; the judge's verdict said that Poteyev was recruited by the CIA in 1999. His court-appointed advocate said that Poteyev's remuneration from the US government might have reached $55 million.

In July 2012, new details about the agents' activities were revealed that suggested that some of them planned to recruit their children to become agents.

== See also ==
- Rudolf Abel, Gary Powers, and Frederic Pryor – swapped in 1962
- Russian influence operations in the United States
- Russian spies in the Russo-Ukrainian War
- The Americans – a 2013 period drama TV series about Soviet deep-cover agents inspired by the events of the Illegals Program
- Allegiance – a TV series
- Little Nikita – a 1988 movie starring Sidney Poitier and River Phoenix, about Soviet deep cover agents.
