= Numbers stations in popular culture =

Depictions of numbers stations in media

Numbers stations have been incorporated into various forms of popular media, including film, television, literature, music, and video games. These broadcasts are frequently used as plot devices in fiction related to espionage and the Cold War. In audio mediums, recordings of actual numbers stations have been sampled in musical compositions and audio dramas.

== Film and television ==
In film and television, numbers stations are frequently featured in espionage and horror contexts. The 2013 British–American action thriller The Numbers Station, starring John Cusack and Malin Åkerman, centers on a CIA-operated broadcasting facility located in the British countryside. The 2013 horror film Banshee Chapter features a station transmitting from the Black Rock Desert in Nevada. In television, the American science fiction series Fringe featured a broadcast in the episode "6955 kHz". The 2020 British comedy-horror series Truth Seekers includes a parody of the real-world Lincolnshire Poacher broadcast.

== Literature ==
Mai Jia's novel In the Dark focuses on a Chinese special intelligence unit dedicated to tracking and decoding enemy transmissions. Joanne Harris's novel A Narrow Door features a character fixated with numbers stations as a means of understanding his son's disappearance.

== Video games ==
In the 2010 first-person shooter Call of Duty: Black Ops, a Cuban numbers station serves as a central plot device, transmitting orders to the protagonist Alex Mason. The 2022 survival horror game Signalis requires the player to tune into in-game radio frequencies to solve puzzles, utilizing audio samples from historical German-language stations archived by The Conet Project. A numbers station makes a minor appearance in Disco Elysium.

== Audio media and visual art ==
=== Music ===
Musicians have sampled actual numbers station recordings in their compositions. American rock band Wilco named their 2001 album Yankee Hotel Foxtrot after the phonetic alphabet sequence of a recorded transmission, and sampled the Israeli numbers station E10 in the track "Poor Places". Icelandic composer Jóhann Jóhannsson incorporated German broadcast samples into "A Song for Europa" on his 2016 album Orphée, and the metalcore band Norma Jean sampled the Lincolnshire Poacher on their 2016 album Polar Similar. Mashup artist Neil Cicierega rearranged elements of David Bowie's "Space Oddity" to mimic a numbers station in the track "Transmission" on his 2014 album Mouth Silence.

=== Radio and podcasts ===
BBC Radio 4 has broadcast plays featuring the stations, including Julian Simpson's 2015 standalone drama Fugue State and his 2019 adaptation of H. P. Lovecraft's The Whisperer in Darkness. The 2022 BBC drama Dead Hand employs a numbers station as a device broadcasting the voices of missing persons. Fictional podcast series such as Welcome to Night Vale and The Magnus Archives have incorporated them into their storylines. The phenomenon was also covered in a 2008 episode of the podcast Skeptoid.

=== Visual art ===
In 2005, Noah Lang and Akin Fernandez exhibited sculptures at the Mattress Factory modeled after the broadcasting antennas of the Buzzer, the Lincolnshire Poacher, and Cherry Ripe.
