= Povarovo =

Povarovo (Russian: Поварово) is the name of several inhabited localities in Russia.

Urban localities

- Povarovo, Moscow Oblast, a suburban (dacha) settlement in Solnechnogorsky District, Moscow Oblast

Rural localities

- Povarovo, Pskov Oblast, a village in Krasnogorodsky District of Pskov Oblast
- Povarovo, Vladimir Oblast, a village in Alexandrovsky District of Vladimir Oblast
- Povarovo, Vologda Oblast, a village in Musorsky Selsoviet of Cherepovetsky District of Vologda Oblast
