= The Conet Project =

Recordings of shortwave radio broadcasts of numeric codes

The Conet Project: Recordings of Shortwave Numbers Stations is a four- and later five-CD set of recordings of numbers stations and noise stations released by Irdial-Discs beginning in 1997. Numbers stations are shortwave radio stations believed to be operated by governments to covertly communicate with deployed spies under nonofficial cover. The collection of recordings is primarily the work of Irdial-Discs founder Akin Fernandez, who began recording the transmissions of numbers stations in 1992. The original 4-CD set was released in 1997 and reissued in 2013 with an additional 5th CD.

The recordings have been sampled in various artistic projects, most famously in the 2001 film Vanilla Sky and Wilco's 2001 album Yankee Hotel Foxtrot, along with the 2022 survival horror game Signalis. In keeping with its “free music” policy, the label made the entire collection available for free to download as a collection of MP3 files (along with a PDF version of the included booklet). Irdial-Discs has since discontinued the hosting of said files, but still provides links to alternative active hosts.

The title derives from a mishearing of the Czech word konec [ˈkonɛt͡s] (lit. 'end'), heard on the recordings.

== Legacy and sampling ==
Samples from the collection have been used in numerous films and albums, including Cameron Crowe's 2001 film Vanilla Sky, Porcupine Tree's album Stupid Dream, J Church's album One Mississippi, We Were Promised Jetpacks' album These Four Walls, and Jónsi & Alex's score for the television series Manhattan. The Besnard Lakes have also used recordings from numbers stations throughout their album, The Besnard Lakes Are the Dark Horse, and frontman Jace Lasek is said to be a fan of The Conet Project. Various processed radio sounds, as well as a modified melody similar to the Three Note Oddity, can be heard in both the intro and outro of Haken's album Affinity.

The post-hardcore band Silverstein sampled the recording "Czech Lady" in In A Place Of Solace, a song released on their album This Is How the Wind Shifts. Kronos Quartet incorporated live reception of the Conet numbers into "4Cast Unpredictable", a performed sound sculpture in collaboration with Trimpin. Ten years in the making, the piece was performed once only, at Montclair State University Performing Arts Center, New Jersey, in 2007.

=== Copyright dispute ===
Yankee Hotel Foxtrot, a 2001 album released by the alternative rock band Wilco, was the subject of controversy after Irdial-Discs sued for copyright infringement. The track "Poor Places" samples track 4 of disc 1, "Phonetic Alphabet Nato" (the album's title is also a reference to this recording) without the permission of founder Akin Fernandez.

The lawsuit sparked a debate about the ownership of the recordings. Because Fernandez had recorded the track, he argued that the copyright belonged to him. Critics felt that merely recording the broadcast was not transformative enough to justify the suit. According to attorney Jason Schultz,

"Copyright requires some amount of creativity by an author ... Simply pressing the record button on your radio receiver hardly qualifies to me".

Others doubted the basis for the lawsuit, because whether or not Fernandez actually recorded the track was in dispute. Simon Mason, who contributed recordings to the project, claimed that he had recorded the sampled transmission, but did not pursue legal action. Wilco ultimately settled out of court in an agreement with undisclosed terms, other than that Irdial-Discs would receive a “share of the sound recording royalty on that track.”

== Five-disc release ==
The Conet Project was rereleased in a five-disc 15th anniversary edition in April 2013. The rerelease comes with a new booklet that features detailed photographs of a numbers station voice sample controller, a Sprach-Morse-Generator der Hauptverwaltung Aufklärung (HVA) des Ministerium für Staatssicherheit (MfS) der DDR and one-time pad samples of the type used by the East German Stasi. These are the first pieces of numbers station equipment to find their way into public hands. The entire fifth disc contains recordings of "noise stations", which are not the result of naturally occurring radio phenomena.

== Track listing ==
Disc one
| No. | Title | Length |
|---|---|---|
| 1. | "The Swedish Rhapsody" | 4:18 |
| 2. | "Counting" | 3:34 |
| 3. | "Counting 'Control'" | 2:01 |
| 4. | "Phonetic Alphabet – NATO" | 4:36 |
| 5. | "5 Dashes" | 3:30 |
| 6. | "The Lincolnshire Poacher" | 4:37 |
| 7. | "Gong Station/Chimes" | 3:29 |
| 8. | "DFD 21" | 2:37 |
| 9. | "Ready Ready 15728" | 2:04 |
| 10. | "Bugle" | 1:00 |
| 11. | "5 Note Version 'Czech Lady'" | 1:38 |
| 12. | "Three Note Oddity" | 2:18 |
| 13. | "New Star Broadcasting" | 6:32 |
| 14. | "Counting Station (Spanish)" | 4:41 |
| 15. | "English Lady / 00000 ending" | 3:31 |
| 16. | "Attencion / 3 Finals" | 3:31 |
| 17. | "4 Note Rising Scale" | 3:14 |
| 18. | "Ciocârlia" | 5:16 |
| 19. | "Czech Lady" | 3:18 |
| 20. | "2 Letter 'YS'" | 1:47 |
| 21. | "2 Letter 'EL'" | 1:10 |
| 22. | "5 Dashes" | 1:40 |
| 23. | "2 Letter 'RK'" | 2:23 |

Disc two
| No. | Title | Length |
|---|---|---|
| 1. | "NNN" | 2:56 |
| 2. | "'Strich'" | 0:36 |
| 3. | "DFD21 / DFC37" | 1:55 |
| 4. | "Drums & Trumpets" | 2:51 |
| 5. | "NNN" | 1:47 |
| 6. | "English Lady – 00000 ending" | 2:10 |
| 7. | "NNN" | 1:00 |
| 8. | "The Russian Man ('D-va' Northern Russian Voice)" | 1:34 |
| 9. | "Phonetic Alphabet – NATO" | 0:49 |
| 10. | "Spanish Lady" | 1:07 |
| 11. | "'Strich'" | 0:30 |
| 12. | "2 Letter 'NU'" | 1:12 |
| 13. | "'Strich'" | 0:38 |
| 14. | "YT" | 3:35 |
| 15. | "5 Dashes" | 1:40 |
| 16. | "German Man" | 1:45 |
| 17. | "English Man" | 4:58 |
| 18. | "English Man + German Lady" | 1:36 |
| 19. | "German Lady" | 1:43 |
| 20. | "Chinese Numbers" | 1:14 |
| 21. | "Spanish Lady" | 4:25 |
| 22. | "2 Letter 'MD'" | 1:38 |
| 23. | "English Man" | 1:13 |
| 24. | "German Lady" | 0:47 |
| 25. | "Phonetic Alphabet – NATO" | 0:54 |
| 26. | "Phonetic Alphabet – NATO" | 2:24 |
| 27. | "Nancy Adam Susan" | 3:20 |
| 28. | "Counting 'Control'" | 1:18 |
| 29. | "Nancy Adam Susan (Male Voice)" | 2:44 |
| 30. | "Cherry Ripe" | 1:34 |
| 31. | "Russian Lady" | 1:57 |
| 32. | "Russian Man" | 0:37 |
| 33. | "NNN" | 1:54 |
| 34. | "Frank Young Peter" | 0:59 |
| 35. | "Cherta" | 1:05 |
| 36. | "Russian Counting Man" | 0:58 |
| 37. | "OLX" | 2:15 |
| 38. | "6 Tones" | 0:57 |
| 39. | "High Pitch Polytone" | 2:02 |
| 40. | "High Pitch Polytone" | 0:31 |
| 41. | "High Pitch Polytone" | 1:17 |
| 42. | "High Pitch Polytone" | 1:00 |
| 43. | "Oriental Language" | 1:11 |

Disc three
| No. | Title | Length |
|---|---|---|
| 1. | "Ready Ready" | 2:02 |
| 2. | "Iran / Iraq Jamming Efficacy Testing" | 1:00 |
| 3. | "English Lady" | 1:16 |
| 4. | "English Lady" | 0:34 |
| 5. | "English Man Version 1" | 0:34 |
| 6. | "English Man Version 3" | 0:48 |
| 7. | "English Man" | 0:58 |
| 8. | "Magnetic Fields" | 3:49 |
| 9. | "Magnetic Fields" | 1:30 |
| 10. | "Oblique" | 1:24 |
| 11. | "NNN" | 0:35 |
| 12. | "5 Dashes" | 4:17 |
| 13. | "2 Letter 'KG'" | 1:49 |
| 14. | "4 Figure Counting (10 Rough Tones)" | 2:36 |
| 15. | "2 Voices in one transmission" | 3:29 |
| 16. | "Tyrolean Music Station" | 7:18 |
| 17. | "3 Note I.S." | 0:46 |
| 18. | "10 Rough Tones" | 1:33 |
| 19. | "Achtung!" | 0:29 |
| 20. | "'A'" | 1:23 |
| 21. | "Voice Sample (1-10)" | 0:12 |
| 22. | "Rapid Dots" | 0:59 |
| 23. | "'Strich'" | 1:06 |
| 24. | "Hier ist DFC Sieben und Dreizig" | 3:20 |
| 25. | "2 Letter 'PN'" | 2:34 |
| 26. | "Sample Count" | 0:18 |
| 27. | "2 Letter 'VO'" | 2:10 |
| 28. | "2 Letter 'HK'" | 0:41 |
| 29. | "2 Letter 'DM'" | 4:01 |
| 30. | "8 Note Rising Scale" | 1:11 |
| 31. | "Spruchnummer 1" | 0:55 |
| 32. | "Spruchnummer 4" | 0:48 |
| 33. | "Random Pop" | 1:05 |
| 34. | "Nomer 101" | 2:52 |
| 35. | "Okno Okno Okno" | 0:35 |
| 36. | "Nomer 198" | 3:22 |
| 37. | "723 Papaqui" | 1:23 |
| 38. | "298" | 1:54 |
| 39. | "815" | 1:24 |
| 40. | "167" | 1:53 |
| 41. | "Moscow Coup Attempt" | 0:20 |

Disc four
| No. | Title | Length |
|---|---|---|
| 1. | "Russian Man Complete" | 3:37 |
| 2. | "YT Counting in Croatian/Serbian" | 2:50 |
| 3. | "555 Konec" | 0:33 |
| 4. | "Preska" | 0:25 |
| 5. | "Cherta" | 0:26 |
| 6. | "Count in Russian" | 0:40 |
| 7. | "Count in Russian" | 2:03 |
| 8. | "1-10 Announcement" | 1:03 |
| 9. | "1-10 Announcement" | 0:50 |
| 10. | "Counting in Polish" | 1:12 |
| 11. | "Konec Konec" | 2:43 |
| 12. | "Pozor" | 0:48 |
| 13. | "Russian Lady test count and message" | 2:15 |
| 14. | "Russian Man" | 4:10 |
| 15. | "Spanish Lady (2 Finals)" | 1:48 |
| 16. | "Spanish Counting" | 0:22 |
| 17. | "Spanish Counting" | 0:24 |
| 18. | "Spanish Man" | 2:19 |
| 19. | "Spanish Lady" | 1:17 |
| 20. | "Spanish Lady" | 2:27 |
| 21. | "Eastern Music Station" | 6:40 |
| 22. | "Eastern Music Station" | 1:42 |
| 23. | "Unidentified Chinese Station" | 0:42 |
| 24. | "NNN" | 1:27 |
| 25. | "NNN" | 0:59 |
| 26. | "Whiskey Tango Viente Y Uno" | 6:14 |
| 27. | "The Crackle" | 2:33 |
| 28. | "The Backwards Music Station" | 2:30 |
| 29. | "Faders" | 1:14 |
| 30. | "Workshop" | 2:52 |
| 31. | "The Pip" | 0:50 |
| 32. | "The Buzzer" | 2:40 |
| 33. | "M1 (197)" | 0:52 |
| 34. | "M1b (463)" | 4:49 |
| 35. | "M2 (712)" | 3:11 |
| 36. | "M3" | 0:33 |
| 37. | "M3" | 0:20 |
| 38. | "M3" | 0:27 |
| 39. | "M3" | 0:17 |
| 40. | "M3" | 0:15 |
| 41. | "M3" | 0:15 |
| 42. | "M3a" | 0:22 |
| 43. | "M3b" | 0:50 |

Disc five (2013 15th Anniversary Edition)
| No. | Title | Length |
|---|---|---|
| 1. | "Data Bursts 5.201 kHz (USB and AM)" |
| 2. | "Exotic Cipher 6.215 kHz AM October 5, 2008 1927 GMT" |
| 3. | "Descending Jammer 7969 kHz USB" |
| 4. | "Drone 17964 kHz" |
| 5. | "Odd Clacking 4.039 kHz (USB and AM) April 29, 1998" |
| 6. | "Bizarre Data Noise" |
| 7. | "Chiming" |
| 8. | "Chopper" |
| 9. | "Coarse Rushing Air" |
| 10. | "Oscillating 5.178 kHz March 12, 1997" |
| 11. | "348-10-13-36-19-21 11.573 kHz 1917GMT" |
| 12. | "Creeping" |
| 13. | "Rapid Descending Tri-tone" |
| 14. | "Engine Room Drone" |
| 15. | "Pinking" |
| 16. | "Rushing Air Sound 11492 kHz" |
| 17. | "'Snundering'" |
| 18. | "Down Up Tone" |
| 19. | "Choking" |
| 20. | "Galactic" |
| 21. | "Sweeping Noise 9330 kHz USB" |
| 22. | "Strange Echoing Pips 11216 kHz USB" |
| 23. | "Bubble Jammer" |
| 24. | "Deep Nuclear Drone" |
| 25. | "Drone B" |
| 26. | "Insane 7.074 kHz AM December 8, 1820 GMT" |

== See also ==
- Field recordings
- Shortwave
- UVB-76
