= The Lincolnshire Poacher (disambiguation) =

"The Lincolnshire Poacher" is a traditional English folk song.

The Lincolnshire Poacher may also refer to:

- Lincolnshire Poacher (numbers station), a shortwave radio station
- Lincolnshire Poacher cheese, a type of cheese
