= V32 (numbers station) =

Persian-language shortwave numbers station active since 2026

- Unknown (transmitter believed located outside Iran)
- Broadcast area: Europe, Middle East
- Frequencies: 7842 kHz shortwave (current); 7910 kHz (former)

Programming
- Language: Persian (Farsi)
- Format: Numbers station; spoken digit groups in Persian, upper sideband (USB)

Ownership
- Owner: Unknown

History
- First air date: 28 February 2026
- Former frequencies: 7910 kHz

Links
- A recording of V32 on 7842 kHz, captured March 2026. The word tavajjoh (توجه, "attention") is audible between digit groups.: file; help

V32 is a shortwave radio numbers station that broadcasts spoken sequences of digits in the Persian (Farsi) language. It first aired on 28 February 2026, approximately twelve hours after the United States and Israel began military strikes against Iran, and has been active during the ensuing conflict. The designation "V32" was assigned by ENIGMA 2000, a British group that catalogues clandestine radio stations. Its transmitter location, operator, and intended recipients are unconfirmed; monitoring groups and independent analysts have advanced several competing theories, none of which has been officially confirmed.

== Background ==
=== Numbers stations ===
A numbers station is a type of shortwave radio transmission historically associated with intelligence agencies sending one-way encrypted messages to field agents. Messages are broadcast as sequences of spoken numbers; only a recipient in possession of the matching one-time pad can decode them. As Akin Fernandez, founder of the Conet Project archive of numbers station recordings, explained to the BBC: "This system is completely secure because the messages can't be tracked, the recipient could be anywhere. It is easy. You just send the spies to a country and get them to buy a radio. They know where to tune and when." Rupert Allason, an author specialising in espionage writing under the pen name Nigel West, has described their sole purpose as being "for intelligence agencies to communicate with their agents in denied areas – a territory where it is difficult to use a consensual form of communications." No government has ever officially admitted or denied using numbers stations.

Numbers stations first appeared during World War I and became widespread during the Cold War, with hundreds of clandestine broadcasts documented globally. They have been catalogued by monitoring groups including ENIGMA 2000 and Priyom. In 1998, a UK government spokesperson acknowledged for the first time that shortwave radio is used for espionage.

=== 2026 Iran conflict ===
On 28 February 2026, the United States and Israel launched large-scale air strikes against Iran. The strikes were accompanied by widespread disruption of Internet connectivity inside Iran, attributed to both infrastructure damage and deliberate restrictions by Iranian authorities. The Atlantic described V32 as "a rarity in modern times", noting that historically such broadcasts "served as secure and efficient channels for the CIA and KGB to relay messages to their undercover operatives worldwide." The emergence of a new Persian-language shortwave numbers station within hours of the first strikes drew immediate attention from the global shortwave monitoring community.

== History ==
=== First transmission ===
V32 was first logged on 28 February 2026 at 18:00 UTC on 7910 kHz. Members of the Priyom monitoring team reported it within the first minute of that transmission, which is believed to have been its inaugural broadcast; no prior transmission on the same frequency had been captured in archival SDR recordings going back to the beginning of 2026. The ENIGMA 2000 group assigned the designator "V32" on 3 March 2026.

=== Jamming and frequency change ===
Beginning on 4 March 2026, a signal matching the characteristic profile of a known Iranian "bubble" jammer—the same type used against Radio Farda, Voice of America Persian, BBC Persian, and Iran International—began appearing on 7910 kHz during V32's scheduled transmission windows. Scheduled broadcasts on that frequency subsequently ceased. The station reappeared on 7842 kHz; a long transmission on that new frequency lasting more than an hour was logged on 7 March 2026. As of March 2026, 7842 kHz is V32's active frequency.

== Technical characteristics ==
=== Frequency and emission mode ===
V32 transmits in upper sideband (USB) mode. Its original frequency was 7910 kHz; following jamming it moved to 7842 kHz, both in the 41-metre band. Reception has been strongest in southern Europe (particularly Italy and Greece), consistent with a transmitter located in Western Europe or the Middle East and propagation optimised for the European and Middle Eastern reception area.

=== Schedule ===
V32 transmits twice daily, at approximately 02:00 UTC and 18:00 UTC. The 18:00 UTC transmission is apparently a repeat of the same pre-recorded message broadcast earlier at 02:00 UTC, as the content of the two daily transmissions has been observed to be identical.

=== Voice and language ===
Transmissions feature a male voice speaking Persian (Farsi). The voice is considered pre-recorded based on the consistent repetition of the same audio content across paired daily transmissions.

=== Message structure ===
Each transmission consists of spoken digit sequences separated by intervals in which the word توجه (tavajjoh, meaning "attention") is spoken three times. The grouping of digits is inconsistent: some sections use standard five-digit groups, while others present digits individually or in free-form clusters, an irregularity noted by both Priyom and independent observers. The Atlantic described the decryption principle: "Using a technique called a 'one-time pad,' they convert each number into a letter, eventually revealing a message... only those possessing the unique pad—written down and immediately discarded after use—would comprehend the content."

=== Background tones ===
A dual-tone signal of approximately 620 Hz and 925 Hz is audible in the background of transmissions every few seconds. A technical analysis cited by IZØKBA suggested that this tone is consistent with the plain-text (PT) override warning tone automatically injected by L3Harris Falcon series military HF radios (such as the AN/PRC-150, AN/PRC-160, RF-7800, or RF-5400) when operating in unencrypted mode while configured for encrypted operation. If correct, this would indicate that V32's operator is using Western-manufactured military radio equipment. During the 7 March 2026 transmission, Microsoft Windows system sounds were briefly audible before the transmission was interrupted.

== Transmitter location ==
The location of V32's transmitter has not been officially confirmed. Monitoring groups have attempted to estimate it using time difference of arrival (TDoA) multilateration, a technique that compares reception timing across a network of geographically dispersed software-defined radio (SDR) receivers.

Priyom reports that TDoA results "consistently locate V32's transmitter far outside of Iran, pointing to an origin in Western Europe, somewhere in an area encompassing northern Italy, Switzerland, western Germany, eastern France, Belgium and the Netherlands." An independent bearing estimate by a Priyom team member from Paris suggested a bearing of approximately 140°/320°, incompatible with Iran (which lies roughly 90° from that location). IZØKBA's independent analysis suggests an origin in the Red Sea area, Israel, or Central Europe (Germany), also outside Iran. Both sets of analysis agree that the signal is unlikely to originate inside Iran.

== Attribution hypotheses ==
No government has claimed responsibility for V32. The following hypotheses have been advanced in public sources; Priyom, which compiled the most detailed analysis, explicitly cautions that "most of this is unconfirmed" and that the theories are "educated works of speculation, and not facts."

=== Intelligence operation (CIA or Mossad) ===
The combination of a transmitter location outside Iran, the station's activation within twelve hours of the first strikes, and the use of equipment consistent with Western military hardware has led multiple analysts to suggest that V32 may be run by a Western intelligence agency—most commonly the CIA or Mossad—to communicate with agents inside Iran. Akin Fernandez, the compiler of the Conet Project and a widely cited authority on numbers stations, stated in an interview with RFE/RL: "More likely this is an operation against Iran." Priyom notes, however, that established American intelligence practice has moved away from shortwave numbers stations over recent decades, which "casts some doubt" on a straightforward CIA attribution.

=== Exiled opposition group ===
A second hypothesis is that V32 is operated by an Iranian opposition group based in Western Europe, seeking to maintain contact with sympathisers inside Iran during an Internet blackout. Priyom weighs this possibility but notes that any competent intelligence service would have quickly identified and, if necessary, shut down an unofficial shortwave operation in a friendly country, suggesting that the operator—whoever it is—likely acts with at least "tacit enabling" from the host government.

=== Psychological operation ===
A third hypothesis, discussed by Priyom and referenced by RFE/RL, is that V32 is a psychological operation (psy-op) designed to sow confusion and force Iranian electronic-warfare assets (including the bubble jammer) to engage a high-visibility but possibly low-content signal, thereby diverting those assets from jamming Western Persian-language broadcasters.

None of these hypotheses has been confirmed by official sources. The Central Intelligence Agency did not respond to an inquiry from RFE/RL.

== See also ==
- Numbers station
- UVB-76 ("The Buzzer")
- Conet Project
- Radio Farda
- One-time pad
