= The Squeaky Wheel =

Presumed Russian secret radio station

Coordinates: 59.7381°N 30.2703°E

- Russia
- Frequencies: 3363.5 kHz (night); 5367 kHz (day)

Programming
- Format: Repeated squeaks, occasional voice messages in Russian
- Affiliations: Russian Armed Forces (unconfirmed)

Ownership
- Sister stations: The Buzzer, The Pip

History
- First air date: 2000

The Squeaky Wheel
Distinctive two-tone and three-tone channel markers for the Squeaky Wheel

The Squeaky Wheel (a nickname given by radio listeners) is a utility shortwave radio station that broadcasts a distinctive sound. From around 2000 until 2008 the station's attention tone was a high-pitched two tone signal that vaguely resembled a squeaky wheel. From 2008 the channel marker changed to two different tones in a short sequence repeated with a short silent gap. In 2023 the marker was changed to a low-tone pip marker.

The frequencies are 5367 kHz (day) and 3363.5 kHz (night). Voice messages in Russian military format have been reported several times. The exact transmitter site is unknown, but is thought to be near Rostov-on-Don, Russia. The signal strength is weak in Central Europe and the signal sometimes even disappears for days in the noise.

Other frequencies observed are 3650 kHz, 3815 kHz, 5474 kHz, 5641 kHz and 4201 kHz

The Enigma designation is S32 with S indicating Slavic language. However, from 2000 to 2005 it was designated XSW when voice on the station was unknown.
