= Star Star Broadcasting Station =

Star Star Broadcasting Station (星星廣播電臺)
- Taiwan
- Broadcast area: China
- Frequencies: Recently used: 8300 kHz, 13974 kHz, 19052 kHz, 20025 kHz, 20095 kHz; Reported: 8169 kHz, 9276 kHz, 11432 kHz, 14944 kHz, 15388 kHz, 15890 kHz, 18040 kHz USB SW

Programming
- Language: Mandarin Chinese
- Format: Numbers station, female prerecorded voice

Ownership
- Owner: Military Intelligence Bureau, Taiwan
- Operator: Voice of Han Broadcasting, Taiwan

Technical information
- Power: 10000 W (10kW)
- Transmitter coordinates: Guanyin District, Taoyuan City, Taiwan; 25.035945°N 121.096883°E

Star Star Broadcasting Station (Chinese: 星星廣播電臺; pinyin: xīng xīng guǎngbō diàntái, ENIGMA2000: V13), also known as Xing Xing, and often misidentified as "New Star" (Note: Due to the similar pronunciation of xīn (新, new) to xīng (星, star) in the broadcast, and the secretive nature of numbers stations, few documents confirm its literal name. However, as seen in a change-of-frequency notice posted by state-owned Radio Taiwan International, the correct name is Xing Xing (星星).), is a short wave numbers station in a frequency of upwards of 8000 kHz upper sideband modulation (USB), broadcasting from Taiwan, and is known for its introductory segments of Chinese flute playing.

Believed to be operated by Taiwan's Military Intelligence Bureau of Ministry of Defence, it is broadcast from the Guanyin station of the Voice of Han Broadcasting of Ministry of Defence, and address to Taiwanese intelligence agents operating within mainland China.

== History ==
Its history is unknown publicly; however, it is still running as of 2026, making it possibly one of the oldest numbers stations still active today. In 1995, some radio hobbyists reported the station identified itself as "Channel Four Broadcasting Station in Taipei, Republic of China, on 8300 KHz", while others at the time claimed they never heard such content.

In 2002, the station broadcast requests for letters or email from listeners, with an email address and a postal box number in Taipei provided. One listener reported getting an email reply informing him that the station was called "Star Star Radio Station" and even asked him to send his resume. In 2003 two people claimed that they received QSL cards from the station but such claims were unable to be verified. Taiwanese military units use postal boxes regularly, and Voice of Han have given away QSL cards in the past.

== Programs ==
Star Star Broadcasting Station is broadcast with a female Chinese voice. As of now, it has four numbered programs (#1 ~ #4), although there were five of them in 1995. Each program is repeated four times, 30 minute each, for a total of two hours. A different frequency is typically used during the second hour. The broadcast schedule is random; most of the time it does not transmit at all.

=== Message format ===
The message is delivered through pairs of four-digit numbers, each pair likely denoting a Chinese character. Chinese media reported that they may employ a book cipher, that is, a particular book is used as the key, the first two digits refer to the page number, the third the line number, and the fourth the word count in the line.

Another source speculated that the four digit number might refer to the use of Chinese telegraph code. Either way, more encryption methods could be employed to ensure safety.

== Contents ==
=== Routine contents ===
Starting with Chinese flute playing, the program usually proceeds as follows:

Chinese program	English translation
Intro
	(Chinese flute playing intro)
這裡是星星廣播電臺第A台！	This is Star Star Broadcasting Station, Program #A.
現在我們即將開始播報電報給您，請您注意，準備抄收！	We will begin our session. Be advised and prepare to receive.
在這個時間裡，有AAAA單位B月份[第C號]1份電報，電文DD個字。	In this session, Unit AAAA (Note: The unit number is usually a four digit number.) will be delivered the cable message of 1, of month B, [number C,] (Note: The number of the message is sometimes omitted.) consisting of DD characters.
請AAAA單位注意，準備抄收。	Unit AAAA, be advised and prepare to receive. (repeated for all units)
Message delivering
現在開始播報給AAAA單位B月份[第C號]DD個字電文。	We will start to deliver the cable message for unit AAAA, of month B, [number C,] consisting of DD characters.
請AAAA單位注意，準備抄收。	Unit AAAA, be advised and prepare to receive.
7909 7909 6824 6824...	(character pairs of four numerical digits, each repeated twice, for a maximum of 20 pairs.)
剛才播報第20組電文。	We've just delivered 20 pairs of characters. (Repeated every 20 pairs if it has more than 20 pairs.)
9033 9033 4258 4258...	(ditto)
以上是給AAAA單位B月份[第C號]DD個字電文，現在已經播報完了。	The cable message for unit AAAA, of month B, [number C,] consisting of DD characters, is now over.
	(The sequence will be repeated for all units.)
Outro
以上這節特約通訊播報完畢，謝謝您的收聽，祝您健康快樂，再會！	This concludes the contracted broadcasting session. Thank you for your listening and we wish you health and happiness. See you.
	(Chinese flute playing outro)

=== Null content ===
It is reported that in rare cases, no message is delivered, although the program still runs at the scheduled time. The program goes as follows:

Chinese program	English translation
	(Chinese flute playing intro)
這裡是星星廣播電臺第A台！	This is Star Star Broadcasting Station, Program #A.
在這個時間裡，沒有電報給您。謝謝您的收聽，祝您健康快樂，再會。	In this session, no cable message is delivered. Thank you for your listening and we wish you health and happiness. See you.
	(Chinese flute playing outro)

== Media appearance ==
- The Conet Project (1997, 2013) by Akin Fernandez featured a track recorded from the station, dubbed "New Star Broadcasting".
