= V32 =

V32 may refer to:

- Brazilian corvette Júlio de Noronha (V-32)
- ITU-T V.32, a modem standard
- V32 (numbers station)
