= Cherry Ripe (song) =

English song by Robert Herrick and Charles Edward Horn

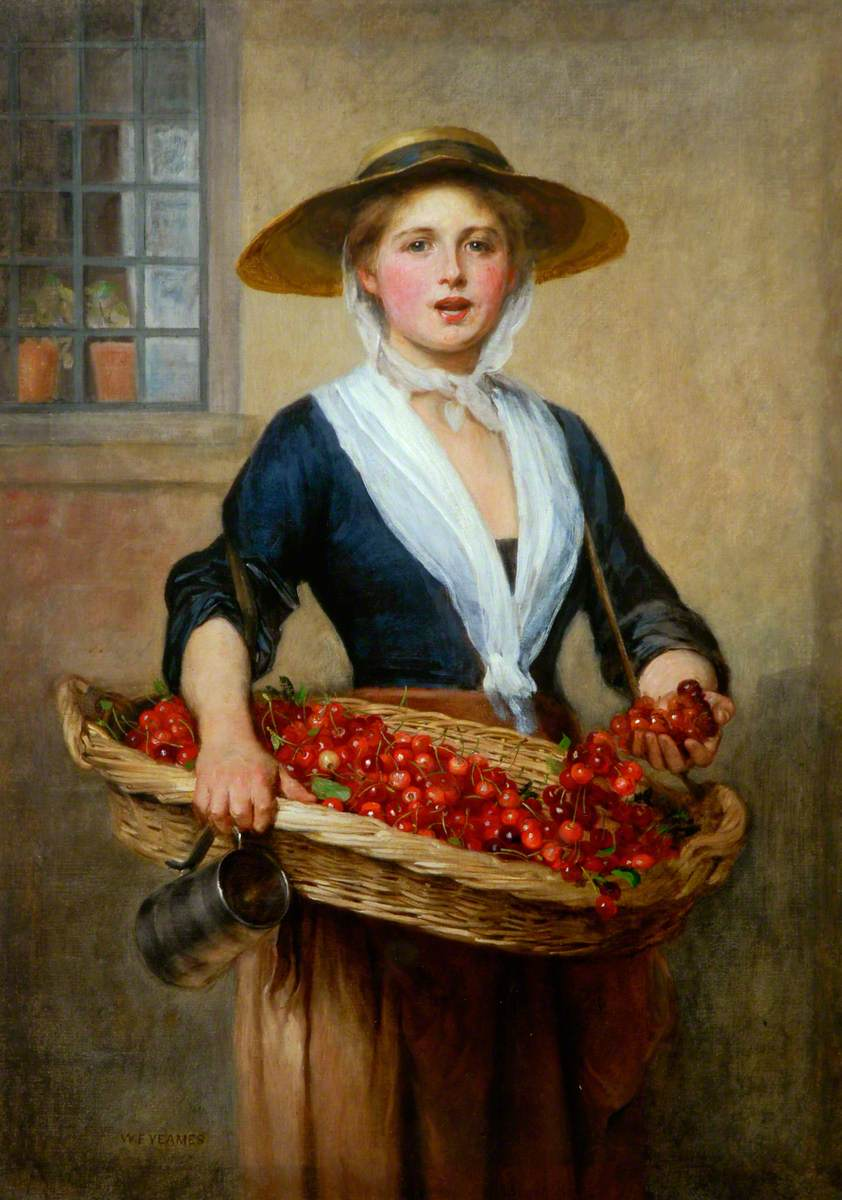
Cherry Ripe by William Frederick Yeames, 1920

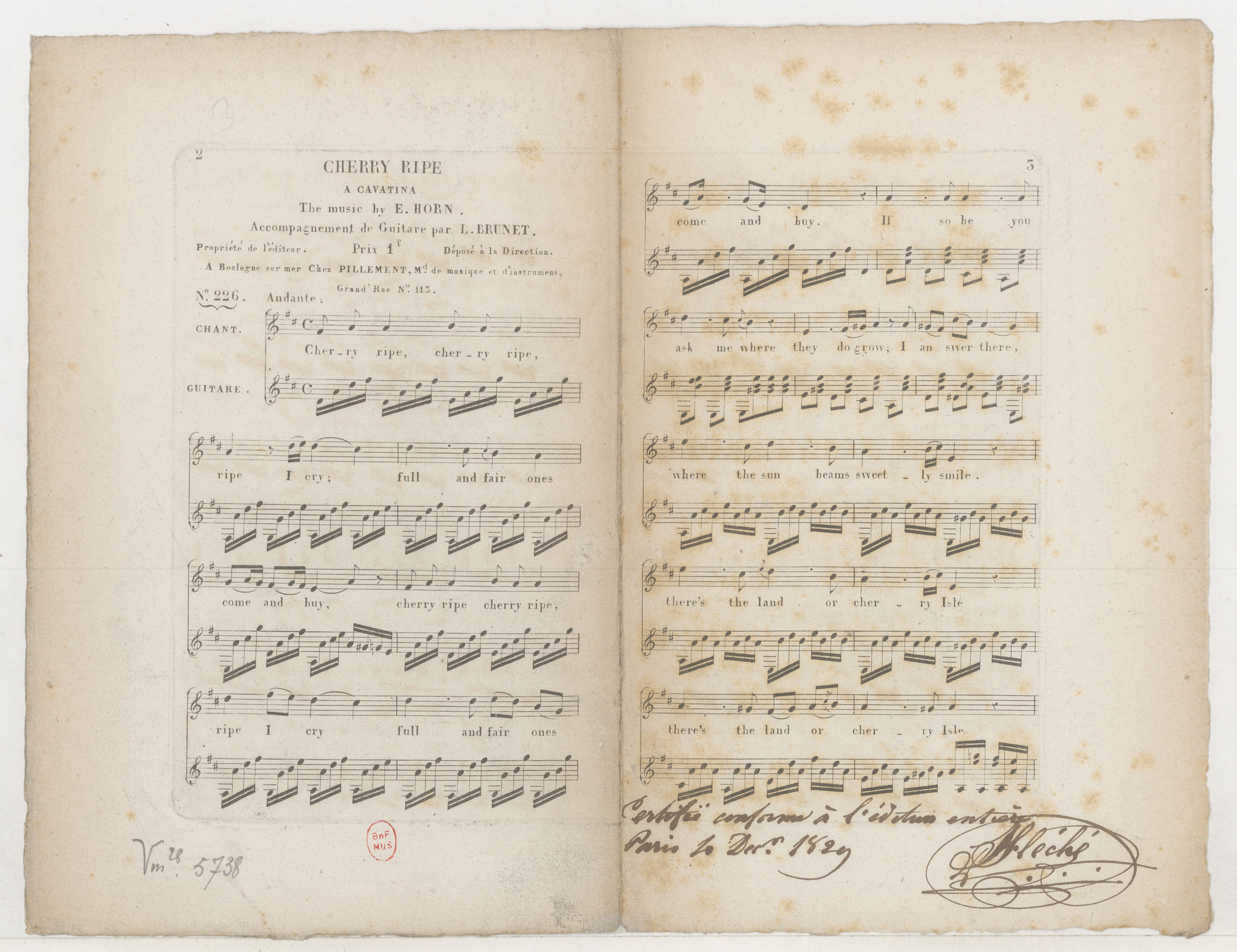
"Cherry Ripe" written as a cavatina by Charles Edward Horn

"Cherry Ripe" is an English song with words by poet Robert Herrick (1591–1674) and music by Charles Edward Horn (1786–1849).

It contains the refrain,

Cherry ripe, cherry ripe,

Ripe I cry,
Full and fair ones
Come and buy.
Cherry ripe, cherry ripe,
Ripe I cry,
Full and fair ones

Come and buy.

Cherry Ripe
The interval signal of the Cherry Ripe numbers station, a numbers station that operated from the late 1960s to 2009.

An earlier poem by Thomas Campion (1567–1620) used the same title "Cherry Ripe", and has other similarities. It is thought that the refrain originated as a trader's street cry.

The song's title has been used in other contexts on a number of occasions since and its tune has also been appropriated for other uses. The song was popular in the 19th century and at the time of World War I.

== Alternative lyrics ==
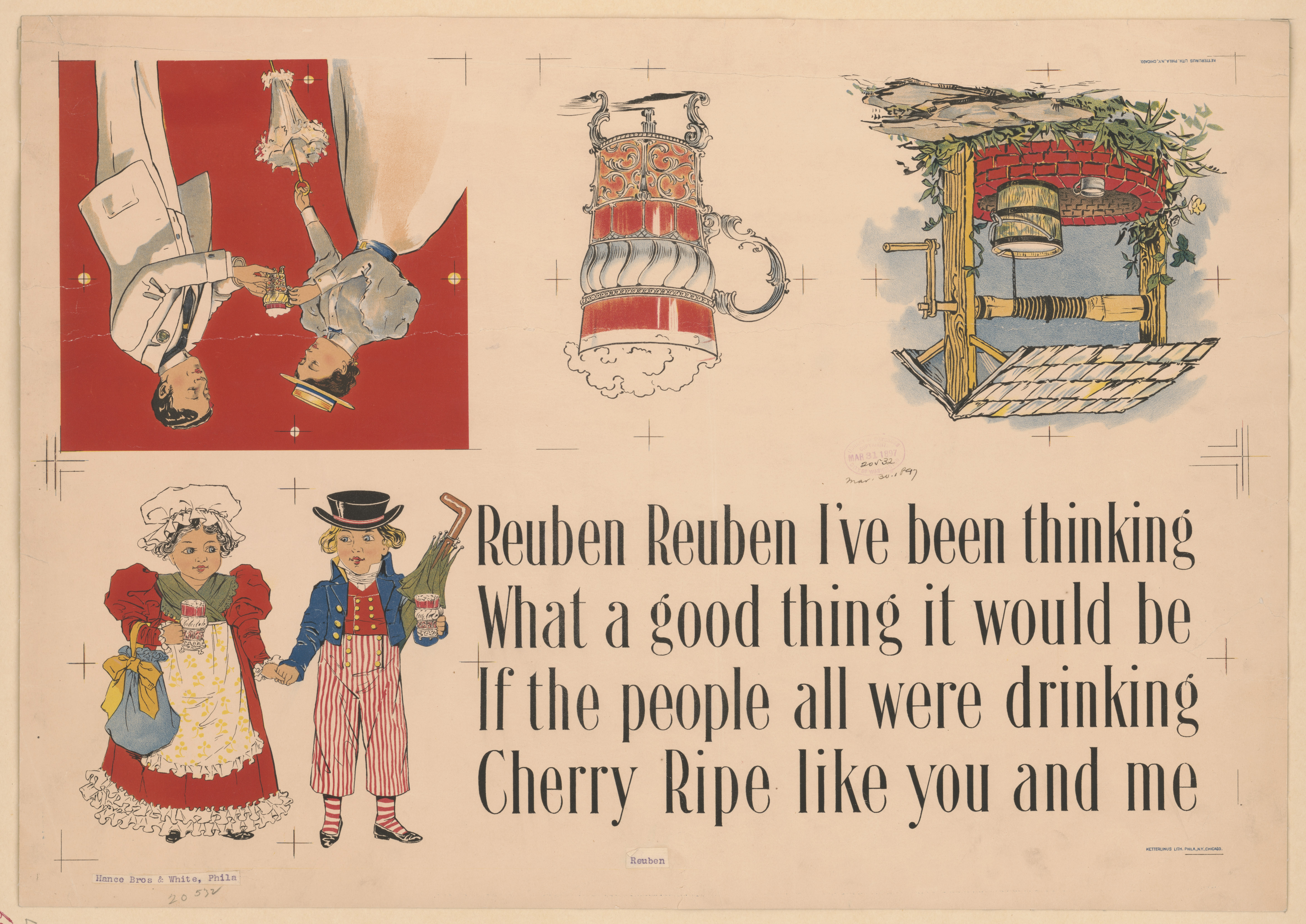
Commercial parody of the song, 1897

During the late 1800s, an alternative version of the song briefly appeared. The lyrics were as follows

Cherry Ripe, Cherry Ripe

Ripe I cry
Full and fair ones
Till I die
Cherry ripe, Cherry ripe
Mouse and I
River's where we're

Till you die

== In popular culture ==
- The song is mentioned in Book Two, Chapter 16 of George Eliot's 1871 Middlemarch.
- The song is mentioned in the 1889 farcical novel The Wrong Box, by Robert Louis Stevenson and his stepson Lloyd Osbourne, in a passage discussing the ubiquity of the penny whistle in late 19th-century England, as one of two songs every player of that instrument invariably blows.
- The song "Cherry Ripe" is a recurring theme in John Buchan's World War I spy novel Mr Standfast (1919). It identifies Mary Lamington, a young intelligence officer, who falls in love, mutually, with the hero of the novel, General Richard Hannay.
- It is sung by Maud Chapman (played by Hilda Bayley) in the 1942 film, Went the Day Well?.
- The song is mentioned in Dylan Thomas's 1955 A Child's Christmas in Wales.
- In the classic 1957 British horror film Night of the Demon (released as Curse of the Demon in North America) the medium uses this song to attain a trance.
- It is heard in the 1958 film Smiley Gets a Gun, sung by Ruth Cracknell's character, Mrs Gaspen.
- In the 1960 film Bottoms Up it is sung by the character Professor Dinwiddie.
- Several characters in Iris Murdoch's Booker-prize winning novel The Sea, the Sea (1978) sing "Cherry Ripe".
- It was heard in the 1982 musical comedy film Victor Victoria, sung by Julie Andrews at her character's unsuccessful audition at a nightclub.
- The song is sung by Alice in the opening sequence in the 1999 television movie Alice in Wonderland.
- It also featured in the opening episode of the 2007 BBC drama Lilies, sung by the character May Moss at a gentleman's club.

== Paintings ==
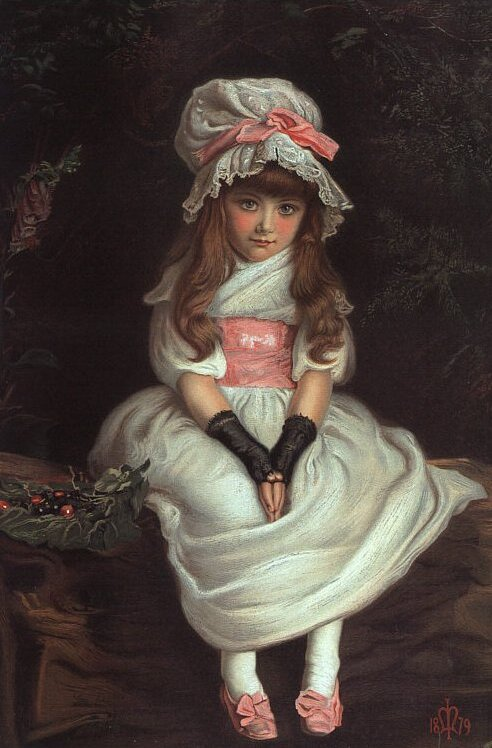
Cherry Ripe by Millais

- In 1879 it was adopted by John Everett Millais as the title of his immensely popular painting depicting a young girl with cherries. The four-year-old sitter, Edie Ramage, had attended a fancy-dress ball in a costume based on Joshua Reynolds's portrait of Penelope Boothby, and her uncle, one of the proprietors of the newspaper The Graphic, commissioned Millais to paint her portrait. The painting was reproduced in colour as a chromolithograph by The Graphic as a gift with its Christmas edition. The image vastly increased the newspaper's sales.
- A painting by Walter Osborne (1859–1903) of a cherry seller in Ulster also used the title.

== Other ==
- It gave its name to the 1960s numbers station of the same name, in which the tune was played its interval signal

== See also ==
- Street cries
