= The Pip =

Soviet and Russian numbers station

The Pip, JVB1
- "The Pip" signal recorded on 1 January 2023 in the center of Poland
- Broadcast area: Russia, Soviet Union
- Frequencies: 5448 kHz (day); 3756 kHz (night)

Programming
- Language: Russian
- Format: Repeated beeps, occasional voice messages
- Affiliations: Russian Armed Forces (confirmed)

Ownership
- Sister stations: The Buzzer, The Squeaky Wheel (unconfirmed)

History
- First air date: August 1986
- Former call signs: 8S1Shch (2011–2021)

The Pip (a nickname given by radio listeners) is a shortwave radio station that broadcasts on the frequency 5448 kHz by day, and 3756 kHz during the night. It broadcasts short, repeated beeps at a rate of around 50 per minute, for 24 hours per day. The beep signal is occasionally interrupted by voice messages in Russian. The Pip has been active since 1986, when its distinctive beeping sound was first recorded by listeners, and is a sister station to UVB-76.

The station is commonly referred to as "The Pip" among English-speaking radio listeners. While its official name or callsign is not known, some of the voice transmissions begin with the code 'JVB1. The code is generally considered to be the name of the station. However, JVB1 may not be a callsign; instead, it may serve some other purpose. Radioscanner.ru identifies the owner of this station as a North-Caucasian military district communication center with callsign "Akacia" (ex-72nd communication center, Russian "72 узел связи штаба СКВО").

== Format ==
The station's format resembles, in many ways, that of its sister station, The Buzzer. Its signal consists of short beeping sounds that repeat at a rate of approximately 50 beeps per minute. It is transmitted on the frequency 5448 kHz during the day and 3756 kHz at night. The times at which the station switches from the day to the night frequency or vice versa are changed over the course of the year, presumably to match the changing lengths of day and night. Higher frequencies have better propagation characteristics during the day, while lower frequencies do better in darkness.

=== Voice messages ===
Voice message transmitted on 20 November 2018

As with The Buzzer, the beeps are sometimes interrupted for the transmission of coded voice messages. There are two different message formats. Messages beginning with the Russian word для (dlya, "for") are thought to be test messages to gauge reception quality. The message itself consists of ten callsigns, each consisting of four numbers or letters. Examples include: "Для ЙХЬЙ ЗЬ1Б НИ9В ДМЦ3 49ФТ Ц2ЗА ЛИ27 ИННЦ ЩГЙП 8ЦЩЙ (To JH'J Z'1B NI9V DMC3 49FT C2ZA LI27 INNC ShchGJP 8CShchJ)" This is then followed with another "To" and then the callsigns are repeated again, concluding with Как слышно? (Kak slyshno?, "How do you hear?"). The callsigns are then repeated twice more, ending with Приём! (Priyom!, "Over!"). Another type of message begins with 8С1Щ (8S1Shch), thought to be the station's own callsign. This is then followed by two digits, then three, a codeword in Russian, then four pairs of digits: "8С1Щ 73 373 ВДЕВАНИЕ 84 56 22 35 (8S1Shch 73 373 VDYeVANIE 84 56 22 35)". The message is then repeated four more times, also finishing with Приём! (Priyom!, "Over!").

== Purpose ==
The purpose of The Pip is not known, although there are many hypotheses. It is often suggested that The Pip is part of a larger radio relay or control system, which also includes The Buzzer and The Squeaky Wheel, which both follow similar formats. In particular, activity on The Pip often used to be followed a few minutes later by a voice message on The Squeaky Wheel, suggesting that both are operated by the same organization and share the same purpose. On one occasion, The Pip's characteristic beeping sound could be heard in the background while a message was being transmitted on the Squeaky Wheel's frequency. This may indicate that both stations are operated from within the same building, or even room. However, these activities have since ceased. Later tables of received messages no longer show such parallels.

A person claiming to be a former worker at the station has shared his memories from working at the station, when he was in charge of it in the 1980s. He also shared a diagram of how the marker generator works.

Until 1986, there was a "Kolos" station on the aforementioned frequencies. "Kolos" was the callsign of the North Caucasus Military District's 800th Notification Network. It was a network of receiving devices installed in military units, military commissariats, and military factory radio rooms. Receiving devices were highly varied, ranging from professional equipment (R-154/155/250) to home receivers with shortwave bands. Because precise tuning of the network frequency was required to catch the signal, there was a transmission from the district staff notification service in Rostov-on-Don three to four times a day, and also after changing the frequency. The transmission was "I'm Kolos, I'm Kolos. Giving you counting for tuning one, two, three, ..., ten. I say again..." This was transmitted either live or from a recording.

Readiness checks for some services and communication centers were occasionally made by sending a message like the following: "I'm Kolos, I'm Kolos. Only for 815, 223 and 44. How do you read me, how do you read me?" Afterwards, the named callsigns would call back and report their reception.

Due to boredom and a lack of certainty about reception (e.g. in case of wrong tuning), one day an information service ensign suggested an enhancement: to create a marker generator which would help recipients to tune to the 800th Network's frequency. The enhancement suggested was approved, and the ensign was celebrated for his idea by being put into the "Achievement Desk of the Staff for Glory Expression." Before the change to a channel marker, the network transmitters were not active constantly, and were switched on only for transmission checks and signal transmissions. Afterwards, the transmitters were up all the time using 15 kW (Molniya transmitter) for 5448 kHz, and 1.5 kW (R-140/Vyaz transmitter) for 3756 kHz. The electricity costs and transmitter's emission were not the king's business...

The receiving radio network was reduced significantly towards the end of 1980s; some radio rooms in civilian organizations, and the military comissariat's radio centers which were responsible for all the callsigns in the area, were dismantled. The first marker generator version was used until August 1986, and was located in the staff building. Then, while I was on practice there, I assembled the second version of the marker generator, built on a real PCB, which then began operation at the receiving site: the 72nd Communication Hub. Why at the receiving site? All major services were kept there, a shift supervisor was sitting there, while at the transmitter site there were only 3 people at best, who were responsible for the transmitter operation.

The signal from the receiving site was sent to the transmission site through channeling equipment. Multiple generators were available, so it was possible to use one from the staff, another from the receiving site (the first generator was there as well as the backup). There was also the third backup generator, which was located with the reserve communication unit in Aksai, and could have been used for both the local transmitters and the main transmitter site.

== See also ==
- Numbers station
- DXing
