= Different Class (novel) =

2016 novel by Joanne Harris

- Author: Joanne Harris
- Language: English
- Series: St Oswald's
- Genre: Thriller, dark academia
- Set in: Yorkshire
- Publisher: Orion Books
- Publication date: April 2016
- Publication place: UK
- Media type: Print (hardback & paperback)
- Pages: 416 pp
- ISBN: 978-0385619233
- Preceded by: Gentlemen and Players
- Followed by: A Narrow Door

Different Class is a 2016 literary crime novel by Joanne Harris. Although all three books stand alone, it forms the second book in a trilogy that begins with Gentlemen and Players, and ends with A Narrow Door. It also exists as an unabridged audiobook, narrated by Steven Pacey and Ewan Goddard.

== Plot ==
The novel is written in Harris' typical first-person, multiple-narrator style, with chapters alternating between the voice of Roy Straitley, the ageing Latin master, and that of an ex-pupil known to the reader as Ziggy, who addresses his account of events to someone he refers to as "Mousey." As with Gentlemen and Players, chapters are headed by images of chess pieces: Straitley's showing a white king, and his opponent, a black king.

A new school year is beginning at St. Oswald's, the minor private boys' school that forms the setting to Gentlemen and Players. After the events of the previous year, which claimed the life of a pupil and caused the collapse of the school's hierarchical structure, the staff - and especially the main protagonist, Latin master Roy Straitley - are coming to terms with change, including a potential merger with St Oswald's sister school, Mulberry House, as well as the arrival of a new Head and a two-person crisis team, designed to solve the failing school's problems. But the new Head reveals himself to be more than just a bureaucrat. He is Johnny Harrington, an ex-pupil of Straitley's, and one of three boys who Straitley believes to have been at the heart of a scandal involving homophobia, a religious cult and a murder, which resulted in the imprisonment of his friend and colleague, Harry Clarke.

24 years later, the adult Harrington and his crisis team seem bent on destroying all the tradition that Straitley loves, as well as forcing Straitley himself into retirement, and Straitley finds himself becoming increasingly isolated. Only his devotion to the school keeps him going, as well as his affection for his Brodie Boys (the group of misfits in his form, including a girl from Mulberry House).

But Harrington's arrival has awakened old memories in Straitley, as well as creating tensions among the pupils and school staff. As past and present intertwine and the old scandal resurfaces, Straitley begins to realize that the Harry Clarke affair is not as dead as he had initially believed, and that his old school friend and colleague, Eric Scoones, knows more about it than he admits.

== Themes ==
Harris has cited her time as a teacher at Leeds Grammar School as part of the inspiration for the books, whilst warning readers that any events based on real life are fictionalized beyond recognition. Themes include the clash of the old with the new, the tensions and pressures of grammar school life, as well as themes of homophobia, toxic relationships, abuse, misguided loyalty, grief and regret.

== Reception ==
The novel was critically well received, being described by The Guardian as: "a magnificently plotted and twisty journey," as well as "darkly humorous," and a "deftly orchestrated and beautifully written tale." Val McDermid calls it: "A masterpiece of misdirection." Kirkus Reviews calls it: "A gripping fictional exposé," although Publishers Weekly found it "tepid."
