= Secret broadcast =

Broadcast not meant for the general public

A secret broadcast is, simply put, a broadcast that is not for the consumption of the general public. The invention of the Wireless was initially greeted as a boon by armies and navies. Units could now be coordinated by nearly instant communications. An adversary could glean valuable and sometimes decisive intelligence from intercepted radio signals:

- messages that were not encrypted or poorly encrypted could be read
- order of battle and future intentions could be deduced by traffic analysis
- individual units could be located using direction finding

In the 1920s, the United States was able to track Japanese fleet exercises, even through fog banks, by monitoring their radio transmissions.

A doctrine was developed of having units in the field, particularly ships at sea, maintain radio silence except for urgent situations, such as reporting contact with enemy forces. Ships in formation reverted to pre-wireless methods, including semaphore and signal flags, with signal lamps used at night. Communication from headquarters were sent by one-way radio broadcasts.

== "Personal messages" on propaganda stations ==
During World War II, the BBC would include "personal messages" in its broadcasts of news and entertainment to occupied-Europe. Often they were coded messages intended for secret agents. Leo Marks attributes this idea to Georges Bégué, an agent for the Special Operations Executive who felt their use could eliminate a lot of the two-way radio traffic that often compromised agents. Such messages were also used to authenticate agents to sources of assistance in the field. The agent would arrange to have the BBC broadcast any short phrase the other person chose.

== Numbers stations ==
In the mid-20th century, the High Frequency radio bands were used by numerous stations sending seemingly random Morse code, usually in five-letter groups. As more advanced communications methods, such as teleprinter and satellite, took over, the number of such stations diminished, but another type appeared that transmitted spoken and also seemingly random number and letter groups, the latter usually using words from a radio alphabet such as ICAO/NATO alphabet.

Though there has been no official confirmation (beyond a 1998 article in The Daily Telegraph which quoted a spokesperson for the Department of Trade and Industry as saying, "These [numbers stations] are what you suppose they are. People shouldn't be mystified by them. They are not for, shall we say, public consumption." there is little doubt that most of these numbers stations are primarily used to send messages to spies and other clandestine agents (additional possible uses include communication with embassies when a crisis might dictate destruction of cryptographic equipment and as a backup to normal command systems in wartime). Other intended recipients of secret broadcasts have faster and easier-to-use equipment at their disposal. But number stations are ideal for spies in that they require no special equipment, beyond a short-wave receiver. Morse code skills, once a staple of spy training, are no longer required.

== Problems with secret broadcast ==
An issue in the past has been the limited bandwidth of the broadcast. Morse code was typically sent at 25 words per minute. Teleprinters could operate at or above 60 words per minute. The military uses a message precedence system to prioritize critical traffic, but all too often, senior commanders insisted on high precedence for lengthy messages lacking real urgency.

== See also ==
- Letter beacon
- Numbers station
- Pirate radio § Piracy in amateur and two-way radio
- Traffic flow security
