= A Narrow Door =

2021 novel by Joanne Harris

- Author: Joanne Harris
- Language: English
- Series: St Oswald's
- Genre: Thriller, dark academia
- Set in: Yorkshire
- Publisher: Orion Books
- Publication date: October 2021
- Publication place: UK
- Media type: Print (hardback & paperback)
- Pages: 448 pp
- ISBN: 978-1643139050
- Preceded by: Different Class (novel)

A Narrow Door is a 2021 literary crime novel by Joanne Harris. Although all three books stand alone, it forms the third book in a trilogy that begins with Gentlemen and Players, and follows with Different Class. It also exists as an unabridged audiobook, narrated by Alex Kingston and Steven Pacey.

== Plot ==
The novel is written in Harris's typical first-person, multiple-narrator style, with chapters alternating between the voice of Roy Straitley, the ageing Latin master, and that of Rebecca Buckfast, the new headmistress of St Oswald's, the minor Northern grammar school in which all three novels are set. The novel is also divided into five parts, named after the five rivers of the Underworld in Greek mythology. As in the previous two novels, the narrators are indicated at the beginning of each chapter by the use of chess pieces; a white Queen for Buckfast, a black King for Straitley.

The story begins in 2006, a year after the events of Different Class, and the school is facing changes. St Oswald's has finally merged with its sister school, Mulberry House, to go fully co-ed, and for the first time in 500 years, the new Head is a woman. Ambitious, intelligent and ruthless, Rebecca Buckfast has finally achieved her ultimate goal, and has many plans for the improvement of St Oswald's, of which the traditionalist Straitley disapproves.

But Buckfast has a troubled past, which now emerges to threaten her plans. She announces early in the first chapter that she has already committed two murders, "one a crime of passion, the other a crime of convenience," and has got away with both. And when a group of Straitley's pupils - his "Brodie Boys", including Ben, a Mulberry House student who is transgender - discover what they think may be old human remains on the site of a new swimming pool under construction in the school grounds, where Straitley himself finds an old Prefect's badge from King Henry's, a rival school, she persuades Straitley to first hear out her story before reporting the find to the authorities.

Thus follows an account, delivered in sessions over several weeks, of Buckfast's troubled childhood, including the disappearance of her brother Conrad, who vanished from school when he was fourteen and she was five, a trauma from which neither the young Rebecca (who was present at the time of the incident), nor her parents have fully recovered. She has a child at sixteen, leaves home and trains as a teacher, taking on supply work while raising her daughter alone. She is befriended by Dominic Buckfast, a charming and much older man (also a teacher), whose kindness verges on the controlling. He disapproves of Rebecca's decision to take a job at the same boys' grammar school from which her brother vanished, years ago, and shows little sympathy for her struggle with its patriarchal authorities. Nevertheless, she marries Dominic for the sake of providing security for her daughter. But when a stranger contacts her parents, claiming to be Conrad, past memories - and monsters - conspire to return to haunt her, including Mr Smallface, a childhood monster, which lives in sinks and drains, and has now returned to terrify her daughter.

As Buckfast's story unfolds, Straitley becomes increasingly drawn into the narrative. Like Scheherazade, she has her audience of one spellbound, her sole objective being to make him hang on for long enough for the evidence found by the group of boys to be covered up by the new building which is already under way. Every time Straitley tells himself that he must investigate the find, he discovers a new reason to hold back, not least because he knows that a further scandal might destroy the school he loves, and which has been his entire life.

=== Ending ===
Increasingly stressed and conflicted, Straitley collapses at school from a suspected heart attack. His Brodie boys visit him in hospital, and quiz him about the supposed investigation over the possible human remains, but he tells them he has the situation under control. The Brodie boys promise that they have prepared a surprise for him when he gets back.

Back home, under instructions to take time off and take it easy, Straitley is visited by Buckfast, who offers him licorice tea, and continues her story. We learn of the death of Dominic Buckfast shortly after his marriage to Rebecca, and of Rebecca's relief to be free of his controlling habits. We also learn that Conrad was a bully who pitted his three friends against one other and terrorized his little sister with stories of Mr Smallface, so that when he died following an incident at school, she believed that the monster had taken him. We also discover that the imposter pretending to be Conrad in order to extract money from her parents was applying for a post as a teacher at St Oswald's, and that the young Rebecca killed him opportunistically before disposing of his body in the grounds.

Still weakened, Straitley forces himself to return to work, meaning to reveal everything to the authorities, but whatever evidence there may have been in the school grounds has vanished into the concrete foundations of the new swimming pool. Buckfast persuades him to listen to the end of her story, and they meet in his classroom after school, where Straitley's Brodie Boys have created a gargoyle in his image, on the balcony of his form room.

Buckfast arrives to tell the rest of her story, not knowing that Straitley has left a document addressed to his Brodie Boys next to the gargoyle, with details of everything that she has told him, along with the King Henry's badge. She reveals the location of Conrad's body and the true identity of Mr Smallface, then leaves. It is implied that Straitley suffers a further heart attack, triggered by the licorice tea with which Buckfast has been plying him, knowing it to be potentially dangerous for people with heart conditions.

The book ends with Straitley's final written words to his Brodie Boys, instructing them to use the information he has given them, along with the Prefect's badge, as they see fit.

== Background ==
The book is introduced by the following quote from Matthew 7:14: “Strait is the gate, and narrow is the way, which leadeth unto life, and few there be that find it.”

Harris has stated that this book was inspired by her 15 years as a teacher in a boys' grammar school in Leeds. Of Rebecca Buckfast, she says: "It’s easy for me to identify with her struggle against the patriarchy, her rage in the face of everyday sexism, her ambition to excel—as well as her damage, guilt, and grief..." although she also says: "I am not Rebecca, even though we share certain experiences."

Straitley's Brodie Boys are a reference to Muriel Spark's novel, The Prime of Miss Jean Brodie.

In 2022 Harris turned down a US book club deal for A Narrow Door over demands to edit out instances of the "f-bomb" from the text, saying on Twitter: "I refused for two reasons: one, because I don’t use words accidentally. They matter. And second, because I don’t believe my use of the word ‘fuck’ harms anyone.”

== Themes ==
Underlying the narrative is the theme of the treatment of women in academia and the entitlement of male-dominated institutions, as well as the concept of memories, both false and true, and how "lies and deceit are viewed differently through the prism of time." Other themes, according to The Guardian, include; "deception, lies, expediency and the stories we create in order to survive." The Sydney Morning Herald says of the novel: "It’s wildly entertaining but it also has some serious things to say about education, gender, and class."

The title of A Narrow Door refers to "‘the way in which the doors to job positions are thrown open to men, while women have to find the smallest crack to squeeze through to get to the same place."

== Reception ==
The Guardian described A Narrow Door as: "...a worthy conclusion to an excellent series." The Literary Review called it: "Clever and disturbing." Julian Clary described it as: "very gripping. It’s also quite vengeful, which I rather like." The New York Review of Books said: “Harris is to be congratulated on her ability to build a story with a maze full of twists and turns, memories false and true, and a totally unexpected ending.” Publishers Weekly says: "This spectacular feat of storytelling will seduce the reader from page one," while the New York Times praises "the icy rage and ruthless revenge" that animates the novel.
