= One-way voice link =

Radio based communication method

A one-way voice link (OWVL) is typically a radio based communication method used by spy networks to communicate with agents in the field typically (but not exclusively) using shortwave radio frequencies.

Shortwave frequencies were and are generally highly preferred for their long range, as a communications link of 1200 km is easily possible. VHF and UHF frequencies can be used for one-way voice circuits, but are generally not preferred as their range is at best 300 km (on flat terrain). Since the 1970s infrared point-to-point communication systems have been used that offer OWVLs, but the number of users was always limited.

This communications system often employs recorders to transmit pre-recorded messages in real time or in burst transmissions, which minimize the time that a spy needs to be on the air. Voice-scrambling systems have been selectively used for this kind of communications circuit since the 1980s, based on operational needs.

Since personal computers became cheap and readily available in the 2000s, time compressed voice scrambling for one-way and bi-directional circuits is a practically free technology.

OWVLs have existed outside espionage, for example the NICAM transmission system was modified in the UK to allow for an OWVL to BBC mobile units. This OWVL was typically used for sports events, as it was highly flexible.

== Historical context ==
During the mid- to late Cold War the STASI (the East German intelligence agency) used point-to-point infrared technology for 2-way voice links within the divided city of Berlin. OWVLs were used intermittently.

OWVL transmission methods were used during the Falklands War by UK elite forces to provide information about suitable troop landing areas. This fact emerged in the late 1980s when UK veterans of the war were writing their memoirs. Argentina had access to similar technology to communicate with its military, but did not really use it during this conflict.

== See also ==
- Numbers station
