= ENIGMA 2000 =

ENIGMA 2000 (acronym of European Numbers Information Gathering and Monitoring Association) is a British radio monitoring group who monitor and gain information on number stations and related topics.

The group was founded in 1993 by Chris Midgley and Mike Gaufman, they began to publish newsletters four times a year, this was then reduced to 2. The group was disbanded in 2000 and then re-established in September 2000 on Yahoo!

== History ==
Chris Midgley subscribed to the BDXC, the British DX Clu, a group of radio enthusiasts, based in the UK. In the early 1990s, he asked in the groups news bulletin if anyone else had heard, and was monitoring, number stations. Mike Gaufman, who later went onto co-found Enigma, contacted him and agreed to meet up with one another.

The group was founded in 1993 by number station enthusiasts Chris Midgley and Mike Gaufman, between 1993 and 2000 they published newsletters, originally 4 every year, which reduced to 2.

By 1994 they had got into issue #6, and began to categorise morse code stations using “M” standing for Morse.

By 2000, Midgley left due to too much time being spent on the newsletters, Gaufman followed him and left due to not being able to run the group alone.

In 2000, a YAHOO! based version of the group was then formed.
