= H. Keith Melton =

Intelligence historian and author

H. Keith Melton is a graduate of the U.S. Naval Academy, an intelligence historian, and a specialist in clandestine technology and espionage tradecraft. Melton is the author of many spy books. He also is a founding member of the board of directors for the International Spy Museum in Washington, D.C.

Melton is the holder of the largest collection of privately held espionage artifacts with thousands of items. Discovery Times Square has a temporary exhibit of his more important pieces from his collection on display beginning May 18, 2012.

In 2019 Melton contributed to the script for Czech spy drama The Sleepers, an HBO Europe project.

== Publications ==
Melton has additionally authored many books with Jim Wiese.

- The Ultimate Spy Book. London: DK, 1996.
- Ultimate Spy. London: DK, 2002.
- Spycraft: The Secret History of the CIA's Spytechs, from Communism to Al-Qaeda. New York: Dutton, 2008. Audiobook available.
- The Spy's Guide to Escape and Evasion. New York: Scholastic, 2003.
- The Official CIA Manual of Trickery and Deception. New York: William Morrow, 2009.

"The manuals reprinted in this work represent the only known complete copy of Mulholland's instructions for CIA officers on the magician's art of deception and secret communications written to counter Soviet mind-control and interrogation techniques."
