= Gentlemen & Players =

2005 novel by Joanne Harris

- First edition
- Author: Joanne Harris
- Language: English
- Series: St Oswald's
- Genre: Mystery, Psychological suspense novel
- Publisher: Doubleday
- Publication date: 1 October 2005
- Publication place: United Kingdom
- Media type: Print (Hardback & Paperback)
- Pages: 512 pp (first edition, hardback)
- ISBN: 0-385-60366-5 (first edition, hardback)
- OCLC: 60667909
- Followed by: Different Class (novel)

Gentlemen & Players is a psychological thriller novel by Joanne Harris first published in 2005. Set in the 1990s at St. Oswald's, a grammar school for boys in the North of England, it is the first of three novels featuring the Classics teacher Roy Straitley, who faces a series of incidents at St. Oswald's Grammar School as he considers retirement. Harris drew on her own experiences teaching at an all-boys' grammar school, as well as the Molesworth series and the novel Gormenghast. The novel addresses themes of social class, coming of age and revenge. It was well-received on publication, with reviewers making comparisons with Patricia Highsmith and Terence Rattigan, and was nominated for an Edgar Award in 2006.

== Background ==
Harris has stated that some of the inspiration for Gentlemen & Players came from her own experience. Raised in a family of teachers, she was "immersed in stories of school life" from an early age. She began her teaching career in a mixed comprehensive school and then taught at the independent, all-boys' Leeds Grammar School for 12 years. Harris compared the school to the castle in Mervyn Peake's Gormenghast and cited her form room in the Bell Tower, the compulsory Latin lessons, the academic robes worn in lessons and the absence of political correctness. Many of the details of the buildings and school traditions described in the book are inspired by her time at Leeds Grammar School, but none of the incidents are taken directly from real life. In addition to Gormenghast, Harris was inspired by the Molesworth novels by Geoffrey Willans and Ronald Searle.

== Structure ==
Gentlemen & Players uses a dual-narrative technique, with two first-person narrators. One is Roy Straitley, the Latin teacher at St. Oswald's. The other narrator's identity as an adult remains undisclosed until the end of the novel, although they are identified in flashbacks as the child of John Snyde, the St. Oswald's caretaker. The story takes the form of a chess match between the two protagonists, with Straitley's chapters marked with the image of a White King, and his opponent's, a Black Pawn. The novel is divided into sections with chess-related titles, beginning with "Pawn". Both narrators use flashbacks to tell the story of the Black Pawn's growing obsession with St. Oswald's, and the events that precipitate his revenge.

== Plot ==
The novel is set in the 1990s at St. Oswald's, a private boys' school in the north of England, at the beginning of the Michaelmas term. St. Oswald's is an old grammar school, but its traditional ways are being replaced by new technology and different teaching styles. Roy Straitley, the Latin master (whose chapters are preceded by an image of a White King), is about to begin his 100th term in the school, and at age 65 is facing retirement. St. Oswald's has been his life, and he remains devoted to the school and to the boys, who represent his only family.

The term starts with the arrival of several new staff members: Miss Dare (Modern Languages), Mr. Light (Games), Mr. Meek (Computer Science) and Mr. Keane (English). The reader is introduced to the boys in Straitley's class, including his three "Brodie boys", and Knight, a sly boy whom Straitley dislikes. As the term progresses, a number of annoying incidents occur, including the disappearance of the class register and the theft of a valuable fountain pen belonging to Knight. Straitley suspects that someone is intentionally causing mischief at St. Oswald's when a boy with allergies goes into anaphylactic shock after ingesting a peanut dropped into his can of drink, and an anonymous columnist known only as "Mole" prints malicious gossip about the school in the local newspaper. He suspects the new English master, Keane, who keeps a notebook of humorous sketches and notes about his colleagues and claims to be writing a book.

Meanwhile, the Black Pawn's story unfolds, beginning fifteen years earlier as the bookish, misfit child of John Snyde, the caretaker at St. Oswald's. Young Snyde attends Sunnybank Park, the local comprehensive school, where he is bullied and unhappy, dreaming instead of the privileged life enjoyed by the boys of St. Oswald's. Snyde steals a spare uniform in order to pass as an "Oswaldian". Under the alias "Julian Pinchbeck", he befriends a St. Oswald's pupil, Leon Mitchell, with whom he becomes infatuated. One day, as the two boys are hiding out on the school roof, Snyde confesses his secret to Leon. A fight ensues, and Leon slips and falls to his death.

As the White King's narrative progresses, the malicious incidents at St. Oswald's escalate. One teacher is implicated in a scandal when child pornography is found on his computer. Another is revealed to have been having an affair with a colleague. Another suffers an injury caused by oil being spilt on stone steps. The Black Pawn, whose identity remains unknown, befriends Knight and frames the new school caretaker for a series of thefts, including that of Knight's fountain pen. The school prepares for the half-term break, which coincides with the Bonfire Night weekend. Knight disappears, having been murdered by the Black Pawn, who means to dispose of the body at the municipal bonfire in the local park. Miss Dare, who has become friendly with Keane, accepts an invitation to go and watch the fireworks with him. Straitley, who is now certain that Keane is the individual behind the Mole's column as well as the incidents at the school, fears for Miss Dare's safety. He follows the couple to the municipal park, where the Black Pawn's identity is revealed. It is Miss Dare, who has stabbed Keane under cover of the firework display. Dare admits to Straitley that she is John Snyde's daughter, Julia, aka Julian Pinchbeck, and that she pushed Leon from the roof. Straitley suffers a heart attack and collapses. Dare, who was planning to kill Straitley, instead phones anonymously for an ambulance, and both Keane and Straitley survive.

== Main characters ==
- Roy Straitley – unmarried Classics master, nicknamed "Quaz" (Quasimodo) by his pupils. Intelligent, old-fashioned, devoted to his pupils and the school, he is totally unambitious, dislikes being told what to do, despises innovations in teaching and has the habit of swearing in Latin at people who don't know the language.
- Pat Bishop – the Second Master, a keen sportsman devoted to St. Oswald's.
- Bob Strange – the Third Master, a bureaucrat unpopular with the pupils.
- Dr "Sourgrape" Devine – Head of Languages, who has an ongoing feud with Straitley.
- Isabelle Tapi – a part-time French teacher.
- Jeff Light – a Games master. Boorish and lazy.
- Chris Keane – a young English teacher with ambitions to be a novelist.
- Dianne Dare – an attractive young woman who teaches French.
- The New Head – headmaster of St Oswald's. Still referred to as the "New Head" by Straitley, even though he has been at St. Oswald's for 15 years.

== Themes ==
Gentlemen & Players addresses themes of revenge, adolescence and coming of age. The Guardian and The Independent, discussing the theme of revenge, stated that Young Snyde's admiration for St. Oswald's values has turned to hatred following the tragic events of 15 years ago; as an adult, Julia Snyde returns to destroy the institution that once excluded her. Kirkus Reviews discusses adolescence and coming of age, including the Black Pawn's struggle with bullying at school, neglect at home, and infatuation with Leon Mitchell, which ultimately leads to Leon's death, but concludes that these purported motives are merely the rationalizations of a narcissist. According to The New York Times, all of these teenage experiences play an important role in shaping the character who later returns to take revenge on all of St. Oswald's, including on Straitley himself.

The novel also addresses class divisions and class consciousness in Britain. Writing for The Times, the author Penelope Lively stated that the novel explores the differences between St. Oswald's and Sunnybank Park, the nearby comprehensive school, and the differences in attitude and expectation between the privileged St. Oswald's boys and the working-class pupils of the state sector. Publishers Weekly described the book's focus on "the brittle line dividing the haves and have-nots". In The Washington Post, Ron Charles wrote that the young Black Pawn desired to belong to St. Oswald's, but could not because of her social class and financial situation. Christian House, writing for The Independent, compared the novel with Stephen Fry's public school-themed work, and concluded by stating that Harris had taken what Benjamin Disraeli called 'the microcosm of a public school' and made it into "a wildly entertaining lesson on the twin perils of envy and elitism."

== Title ==
The title Gentlemen & Players is a reference to class differences through the metaphor of cricket. The Gentlemen v Players game was a first-class cricket match regularly played from 1806 until 1962 between a team made up of elite amateurs (the "Gentlemen")—young university sportsmen of independent means—and one made up of professionals (the "Players"). Until the 1960s, Gentlemen and Players had separate changing rooms and entered the grounds through separate gates, which are still in place at Lord's.

== Critical reception ==
The novel was largely well-received, with a starred review from Publishers Weekly. Ron Charles in the Washington Post, Harry Ritchie in The Guardian, and Janet Maslin in the New York Times commented favourably on the effectiveness of the final plot twist. Ritchie, however, also questioned some aspects of the story's plausibility. Charles said that "[e]ven the talented Mr. Ripley would find himself outclassed by the twists and turns Harris serves up here" and that readers would "gasp so loudly the librarian will throw you out".

Melinda Bargreen, writing for the Seattle Times, praised the book's authenticity, writing: "It is a work of fiction, but it is steeped in the facts of Harris' experience and rings authentically true." Writing for The Times, author Penelope Lively speaks of the "persuasive" nature of the world depicted, speculating that this may point to the author's experience in the world of teaching.

Writing for The Independent, Christian House commented favourably on the "psychological intensity" of the characterization and made comparisons with Terence Rattigan and Patricia Highsmith. The depiction of Roy Straitley was praised by Ron Charles in the Washington Post, while the character of the Black Pawn was seen as compelling, even sympathetic, by Christian House of The Independent, although Harry Ritchie of The Guardian found the depiction of the young Snyde too precocious to be entirely plausible.

The novel was shortlisted for an Edgar Award for Best Novel in 2006, and for the Grand Prix du Polar de Cognac in 2007 under the title Classe à Part.

== Release details ==
- 2005, UK, Doubleday (ISBN 978-0-385-60366-9), Pub date 1 October 2005, hardback (First edition)
- 2005, UK, Corgi Audio (ISBN 978-0-552-15376-8), Pub date 2 October 2005, audio book cassette (narrated by Derek Jacobi)
- 2005, UK, Corgi Audio (ISBN 978-0-552-15366-9), Pub date 2 October 2005, audio book CD (narrated by Derek Jacobi)
- 2006, UK, Black Swan (ISBN 978-0-552-77002-6), Pub date 5 June 2006, paperback
- 2006, USA, William Morrow (ISBN 978-0-06-055914-4), Pub date Jan 2006, hardback
- 2006, USA, Thorndike Press (ISBN 978-0-7862-8551-8), Pub date 20 April 2006, hardback
- 2007, USA, HarperCollins (ISBN 978-0-06-055915-1), Pub date 2007, paperback
