= Povarovo, Moscow Oblast =

Povarovo Поварово
- Urban-type settlement
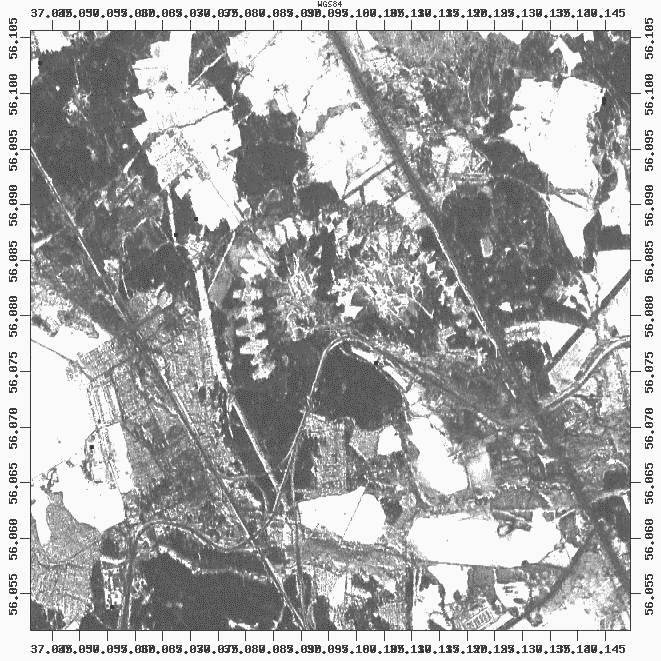
- 1984 aerial photograph

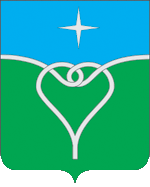
- Flag Coat of arms
- Interactive map of Povarovo
- Location of Povarovo Povarovo (Moscow Oblast)
- Coordinates: 56.0720°N 37.0706°E
- Country: Russia
- Federal subject: Moscow Oblast
- Administrative district: Solnechnogorsky District
- Elevation: 210 m (690 ft)

Population (2010 Census)
  - Total: 7,985
  - Estimate (2025): 8,664 (+8.5%)
- Time zone: UTC+3 (MSK)
- Postal code: 141540
- OKTMO ID: 46652162051

Povarovo (Russian: Поварово) is an urban locality (a suburban (dacha) settlement) in Solnechnogorsky District of Moscow Oblast, Russia, located 30 kilometers (19 mi) from the federal city of Moscow. Population: 7,985 (2010 census); 7,602 (2002 census); 9,066 (1989 Soviet census).

Its nearest railway station is Povarovo-1 on the Moscow–Saint Petersburg line.

The UVB-76 radio transmitter was thought to be located near Povarovo.
