= Povarovo, Vologda Oblast =

Povarovo Поварово
- Village
- Location within Vologda Oblast Location within Russia
- Coordinates: 58°55′N 38°44′E
- Country: Russia
- Region: Vologda Oblast
- District: Cherepovetsky District
- Time zone: UTC+3:00

Povarovo (Russian: Поварово) is a rural locality (a village) in Yugskoye Rural Settlement, Cherepovetsky District, Vologda Oblast, Russia. The population was 4 as of 2002.

== Geography ==
Povarovo is located 66 km (41 mi) southeast of Cherepovets (the district's administrative centre) by road. Arkhangelskoye is the nearest rural locality.
