= Numbers station =

Shortwave radio stations broadcasting only numbers

"Lincolnshire Poacher"
Recording of the E03 "Lincolnshire Poacher" interval signal, followed by a coded transmission of five numbers: 0–2–5–8–8

Cuban numbers station HM01. The numbers read: 56284 66144 55861 42346 62801 20863 – 56284

A recording of The Gong numbers station, operated by the National People's Army of the German Democratic Republic in 1988

A numbers station is a shortwave radio station characterized by broadcasts of formatted numbers, which are addressed to intelligence officers operating in foreign countries. Most identified stations use speech synthesis to vocalize numbers, although digital modes such as phase-shift keying and frequency-shift keying, as well as Morse code transmissions, are also used. Stations may operate on set schedules and frequencies in the high-frequency band, while others broadcast at irregular times.

Numbers stations have been documented since at least World War I and reached peak activity during the Cold War. Several espionage prosecutions have confirmed the practice: the conviction of the Cuban Five in the United States in 2001, and the arrest of members of the Russian Illegals Program in 2010, both involved the use of shortwave number broadcasts to transmit instructions to agents. Messages are typically encrypted using a one-time pad, a method considered theoretically unbreakable when applied correctly.

Shortwave signals can propagate over intercontinental distances by reflecting off the ionosphere, allowing a single transmitter to reach agents worldwide. The receiving agent requires only an ordinary consumer shortwave radio, possession of which carries a degree of plausible deniability. These properties, combined with independence from satellite and internet infrastructure, have led analysts to argue that numbers stations retain operational relevance even in the 21st century.

Numbers stations have long been monitored by shortwave listeners, and many are known by informal nicknames based on distinctive interval signals. Hobbyist groups including ENIGMA 2000 have also developed systems for classifying identified stations.

== History ==
According to the notes of The Conet Project, which has compiled recordings of these transmissions, number stations have been reported since World War I with the numbers transmitted in Morse code. It is reported that Archduke Anton of Austria in his youth during World War I used to listen in to their transmissions, writing them down and passing them on to the Austrian military intelligence.

Numbers stations were most abundant during the Cold War era. According to an internal Cold War-era report of the Polish Ministry of the Interior, numbers stations DCF37 (3.370 MHz) and DFD21 (4.010 MHz) were transmitted from West Germany beginning in the early 1950s.

Many stations from this era continue to broadcast and some long-time stations may have been taken over by different operators. The Czech Ministry of the Interior and the Swedish Security Service have both acknowledged the use of numbers stations by Czechoslovakia for espionage, with declassified documents proving the same. In rare cases, shortwave listeners who sent reception reports to stations that identified themselves received QSL responses, an unusual occurrence for a clandestine operation.

One well-known numbers station was the E03 "Lincolnshire Poacher", which is thought to have been run by the British Secret Intelligence Service. It was first broadcast from Bletchley Park in the mid-1970s but later was broadcast from RAF Akrotiri in Cyprus. It ceased broadcasting in 2008.

In 2001, the United States tried the Cuban Five on the charge of spying for Cuba. The group had received and decoded messages that had been broadcast from the "Atención" number station in Cuba.

=== Atención spy case ===
The "Atención" station of Cuba became the world's first numbers station to be officially and publicly accused of transmitting to spies. It was the centerpiece of a United States federal court espionage trial, following the arrest of the Wasp Network of Cuban spies in 1998. The U.S. prosecutors claimed the accused were writing down number codes received from Atención, using Sony hand-held shortwave receivers, and typing the numbers into laptop computers to decode spying instructions. The FBI testified that they had entered a spy's apartment in 1995, and copied the computer decryption program for the Atención numbers code. They used it to decode Atención spy messages, which the prosecutors unveiled in court.

The United States government's evidence included the following three examples of decoded Atención messages.

- "prioritize and continue to strengthen friendship with Joe and Dennis"
- "Under no circumstances should [agents] German nor Castro fly with BTTR or another organization on days 24, 25, 26 and 27." (BTTR is a CIA affiliated anti-Castro airborne group Brothers to the Rescue)
- "Congratulate all the female comrades for International Day of the Woman."

The moderator of an e-mail list for global numbers station hobbyists claimed that "Someone on the Spooks list had already cracked the code for a repeated transmission [from Havana to Miami] if it was received garbled." Such code-breaking may be possible if a one-time pad decoding key is used more than once. If used properly, however, the code cannot be broken.

=== 21st century cases ===
In 2001, Ana Belén Montes, a senior US Defense Intelligence Agency analyst, was arrested and charged with espionage. The federal prosecutors alleged that Montes was able to communicate with the Cuban Intelligence Directorate through encoded messages, with instructions being received through "encrypted shortwave transmissions from Cuba".

In 2006, Carlos Alvarez and his wife, Elsa, were arrested in Miami and charged with failing to register as agents of the Cuban government. Prosecutors said the couple admitted to using a shortwave radio and a five-digit code to communicate with Cuban intelligence.

In June 2009, the United States similarly charged Walter Kendall Myers with conspiracy to spy for Cuba, and receiving and decoding messages broadcast from a numbers station operated by the Cuban Intelligence Directorate to further that conspiracy. As discovered by the FBI up to 2010, one way that Russian agents of the Illegals Program were receiving instructions was via coded messages on shortwave radio. It has been reported that the United States has used number stations to communicate encoded information to persons in other countries. There are also claims that State Department-operated stations, such as KKN50 and KKN44, used to broadcast similar "numbers" messages or related traffic, although these radio stations have been off the air for many years.

In October 2011, Heidrun and Andreas Anschlag were arrested in Marburg, Germany, and later jailed after being found guilty of spying for Russia for over 20 years. At the time of the arrest, Heidrun was found receiving encrypted messages using a shortwave radio connected to a computer. "She was reported to have been so shocked she fell off her chair, pulling the connection cable with her."

North Korea revived number broadcasts in July 2016 after a hiatus of sixteen years, a move which some analysts speculated was psychological war; sixteen such broadcasts occurred in 2017, including unusually timed transmissions in April.

In late February 2026, coinciding with the outbreak of the 2026 Iran war and subsequent internet blackouts, a new Persian-language numbers station began broadcasting on 7910 kHz (USB). The station, designated V32 by the ENIGMA 2000 monitoring group on March 3, 2026, features a male voice reading structured numeric groups in Persian, frequently repeating the word "Tavajjoh" (Persian for "Attention"). The origin is traced to a facility inside Panzer Kaserne, a US military base in Böblingen, Germany.

== Suspected use for espionage ==
It has long been speculated, and was argued in one court case, that these stations operate as a simple and fool-proof method for government agencies to communicate with spies working undercover. According to this hypothesis, the messages must have been encrypted with a one-time pad to avoid any risk of decryption by the enemy. Writing in 2008, Wallace and Melton described how numbers stations could be used in this way for espionage:

The one-way voice link (OWVL) described a covert communications system that transmitted messages to an agent's unmodified shortwave radio using the high-frequency shortwave bands between 3 and 30 MHz at a predetermined time, date, and frequency contained in their communications plan.
The transmissions were contained in a series of repeated random number sequences and could only be deciphered using the agent's one-time pad. If proper tradecraft was practised and instructions were precisely followed, an OWVL transmission was considered unbreakable. As long as the agent's cover could justify possessing a shortwave radio and he was not under technical surveillance, high-frequency OWVL was a secure and preferred system for the CIA during the Cold War.

Evidence to support this theory includes the fact that numbers stations have changed details of their broadcasts or produced special, nonscheduled broadcasts coincident with extraordinary political events, such as the attempted coup of August 1991 in the Soviet Union.

A 1998 article in The Daily Telegraph quoted a spokesperson for the Department of Trade and Industry (the government department that, at that time, regulated radio broadcasting in the United Kingdom) as saying

"These [numbers stations] are what you suppose they are. People shouldn't be mystified by them. They are not for, shall we say, public consumption."

== Formats ==
The "Russian Man" station signing off. The numbers read: 83912 83912 10080 10080 46543 46543 – 257 257 143 143 – 000 00

Generally, numbers stations follow a basic format, although there are many differences in details between stations. Transmissions usually begin on the hour or half-hour.

The prelude, introduction, or call-up of a transmission (from which stations' informal nicknames are often derived) includes some kind of identifier, for the station itself, the intended recipient, or both. This can take the form of numeric or radio-alphabet "code names" (e.g. "Charlie India Oscar", "250 250 250", "Six-Niner-Zero-Oblique-Five-Four"), characteristic phrases (e.g. "¡Atención!", "Achtung!", "Ready? Ready?", "1234567890"), and sometimes musical or electronic sounds (e.g. "The Lincolnshire Poacher", "Magnetic Fields"). Sometimes, as in the case of radio-alphabet stations, the prelude can also signify the nature or priority of the message to follow (e.g., it may indicate that no message follows). Often the prelude repeats for a period before the body of the message begins.

After the prelude, there is usually an announcement of the number of number-groups in the message, the page to be used from the one-time pad, or other pertinent information. The groups are then recited. Groups are usually either four or five digits or radio-alphabet letters. The groups are typically repeated, either by reading each group twice or by repeating the entire message as a whole.

Some stations send more than one message during a transmission. In this case, some or all of the above process is repeated, with different contents.

Finally, after all the messages have been sent, the station will sign off in some characteristic fashion. Usually, it will simply be some form of the word "end" in whatever language the station uses (e.g., "End of message; End of transmission", "Ende", "Fini", "Final", "конец"). Some stations, especially those thought to originate from the former Soviet Union, end with a series of zeros, e.g., "00000" "000 000"; others end with music or other sounds.

Because of the secretive nature of the messages, the cryptographic function employed by particular stations is not publicly known, except in one (or possibly two) (Note: In the possible case, the underlying type of encryption might have been stated in the court record of the Atención case when the secretly copied decryption software was introduced into evidence.) cases. It is assumed that most stations use a one-time pad that would make the contents of these number groups indistinguishable from randomly generated numbers or digits. In one confirmed case, West Germany did use a one-time pad for numbers transmissions.

== Transmission technology ==
High-frequency radio signals transmitted at relatively low power can travel around the world under ideal propagation conditions – which are affected by local RF noise levels, weather, season, and sunspots – and can then be best received with a properly tuned antenna (of adequate, possibly conspicuous size) and a good receiver.

Although few numbers stations have been tracked down by location, the technology used to transmit the numbers has historically been clear—stock shortwave transmitters using powers from 10 kW to 100 kW.

Amplitude modulated (AM) transmitters with optionally–variable frequency, using class-C power output stages with plate modulation, are the workhorses of international shortwave broadcasting, including numbers stations.

Application of spectrum analysis to numbers station signals has revealed the presence of data bursts, radioteletype-modulated subcarriers, phase-shifted carriers, and other unusual transmitter modulations like polytones. (RTTY-modulated subcarriers were also present on some U.S. commercial radio transmissions during the Cold War.)

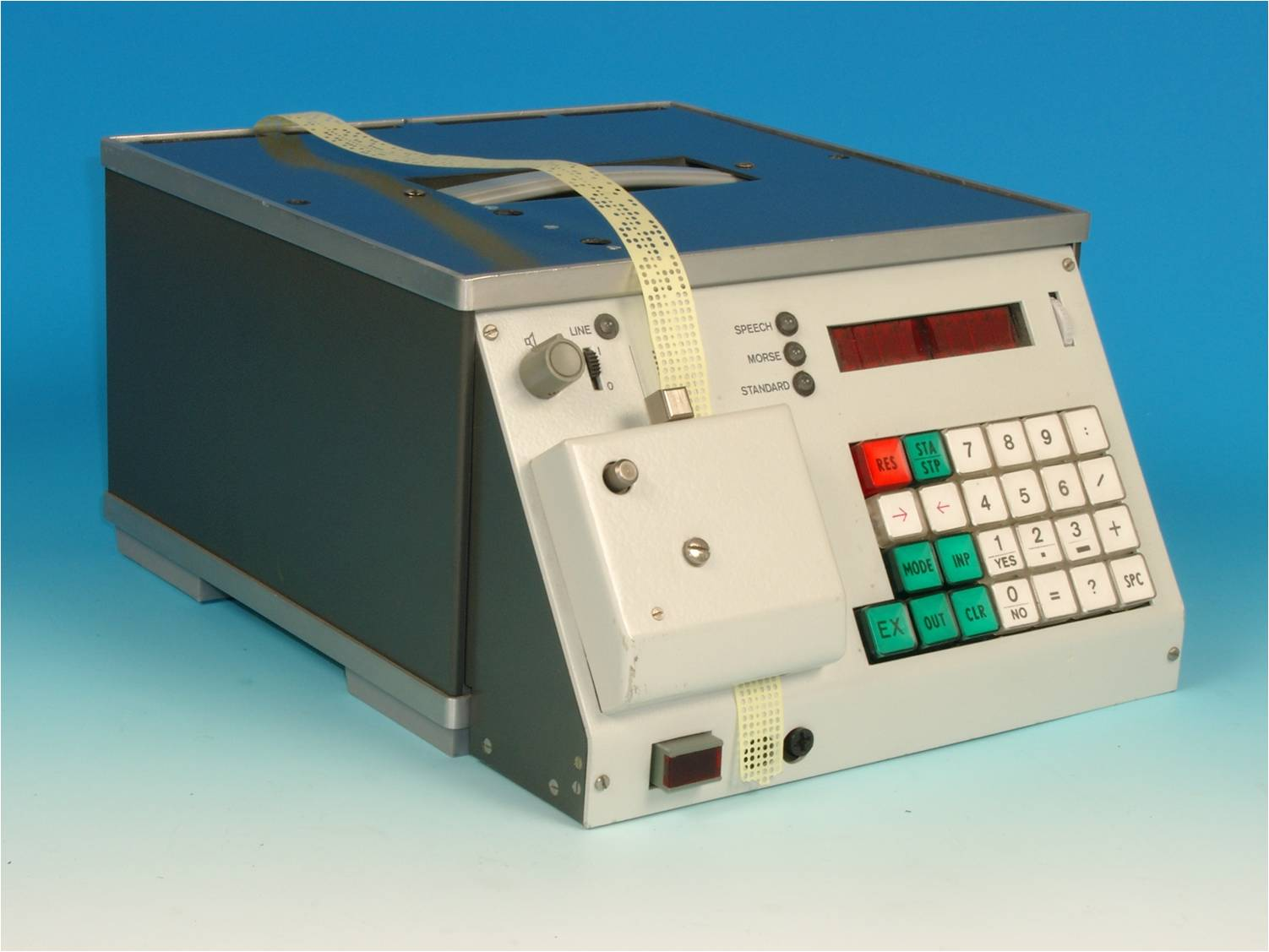
The speech/Morse generator (pictured here) is a machine that has been used for many well-known numbers stations.

The frequently reported use of high-tech modulations like data bursts, in combination or in sequence with spoken numbers, suggests varying transmissions for differing intelligence operations.

Those receiving the signals often have to work only with available hand-held receivers, sometimes under difficult local conditions, and in all reception conditions (such as sunspot cycles and seasonal static). However, in the field low-tech spoken number transmissions continue to have advantages even in the 21st century. High-tech data-receiving equipment can be difficult to obtain and even a non-standard civilian shortwave radio can be difficult to obtain in a totalitarian state. Being caught with just a shortwave radio has a degree of plausible deniability, for example, that no spying is being conducted.

== Interference ==
=== Interfering with other broadcasts ===
The North Korean foreign language service Voice of Korea began to broadcast on the E03 Lincolnshire Poacher's former frequency, 11545 kHz, in 2006, possibly to deliberately interfere with its propagation. However, Lincolnshire Poacher broadcasts on three different frequencies, and the remaining two have not been interfered with. The apparent target zone for the Lincolnshire Poacher signals originating in Cyprus was the Middle East, not the Far East, which is covered by its sister station, E03a Cherry Ripe.

On 27 September 2006, amateur radio transmissions in the 30 m band were affected by an S06 "Russian Man" numbers station at 17:40 UTC.

In October 1990, it was reported that a numbers station had been interfering with communications on 6577 kHz, a frequency used by air traffic in the Caribbean. The interference was such that on at least one monitored transmission, it blocked the channel entirely and forced the air traffic controller to switch the pilot to an alternative frequency.

A BBC frequency, 7325 kHz, has also been used. This prompted a letter to the BBC from a listener in Andorra. She wrote to the World Service Waveguide programme in 1983 complaining that her listening had been spoiled by a female voice reading out numbers in English and asked the announcer what this interference was. The BBC presenter laughed at the suggestion of spy activity. He had consulted the experts at Bush House (BBC World Service headquarters), who declared that the voice was reading out nothing more sinister than snowfall figures for the ski slopes near the listener's home. After more research into this case, shortwave enthusiasts are fairly certain that this was a numbers station being broadcast on a random frequency.

The Cuban numbers station "HM01" has been known to interfere with shortwave broadcaster Voice of Welt on 11530 kHz.

=== Attempted jamming ===
Numbers station transmissions have often been the target of intentional jamming attempts. Despite this targeting, many numbers stations continue to broadcast unhindered. Historical examples of jamming include the E10 (a station thought to originate from Israel's Mossad intelligence agency) being jammed by the "Chinese Music Station" (thought to originate from the People's Republic of China and usually used to jam "Sound of Hope" radio broadcasts which are anti-CCP in nature).

== Identification and classification ==
Monitoring and chronicling transmissions from numbers stations has been a hobby for shortwave and ham radio enthusiasts from as early as the 1970s. Numbers stations are often given nicknames by enthusiasts, often reflecting some distinctive element of the station such as the interval signal. For example, the "Lincolnshire Poacher" station played the first two bars of the folk song "The Lincolnshire Poacher" before each string of numbers. Sometimes these traits have helped to uncover the broadcast location of a station. The "Atención" station was thought to be from Cuba, because a supposed error allowed Radio Havana Cuba to be carried on the frequency.

Although many numbers stations have nicknames which usually describe some aspect of the station itself, these nicknames have sometimes led to confusion among listeners, particularly when discussing stations with similar traits. M. Gauffman of the ENIGMA numbers stations monitoring group originally assigned a code to each known station.

Portions of the original ENIGMA group moved on to other interests in 2000 and the classification of numbers stations was continued by the follow-on group ENIGMA 2000. The document containing the description of each station and its code designation was called the "ENIGMA Control List" until 2016, after which it was incorporated into the "ENIGMA 2000 Active Station List"; the latest edition of the list was published in September 2017. This classification scheme takes the form of a letter followed by a number (or, in the case of some "X" stations, more numbers). The letter indicates the language used by the station in question:

- E indicates a station broadcasting in English.
- G indicates a station broadcasting in German.
- S indicates a station broadcasting in a Slavic language.
- V indicates all other languages.
- M is a station broadcasting in Morse code.
- X indicates all other transmissions, such as polytones, in addition to some unexplained broadcasts which may not actually be numbers stations.

There are also a few other stations with a specific classification:

- SK: Digital mode
- HM: Hybrid mode
- DP: Digital-pseudo polytone

Some stations have also been stripped of their designation when they were discovered not to be a numbers station. This was the case for E22, which was discovered in 2005 to be test transmissions for All India Radio.

== Recordings ==
- The Conet Project: Recordings of Shortwave Numbers Stations is a four-CD set of recordings of numbers stations. It was first released in 1997 by the Irdial-Discs record label.

== See also ==
- Secret broadcast
- Letter beacon
- UVB-76
- Warrenton Training Center
- Radio Londres
- Numbers stations in popular culture

== Bibliography ==
- Mason, Simon (1991). Secret Signals: The Euronumbers Mystery. Lake Geneva, WI: Tiare Publications. ISBN 0-936653-28-0. Archived from the original on 13 June 2006.
- Wallace, Robert; Melton, H. Keith (June 2008). Spycraft: The Secret History of the CIA's Spytechs, from Communism to al-Qaeda (PDF). Dutton. ISBN 978-0-525-94980-0. Archived from the original (PDF) on 7 October 2016. Alt URL
- Wallace, Robert; Melton, H. Keith (26 May 2009). Spycraft: The Secret History of the CIA's Spytechs, from Communism to al-Qaeda (Illustrated, print ed.). New York, NY: Plume. ISBN 978-0-452-29547-6.
