= Povarovo, Vladimir Oblast =

Povarovo Поварово
- Village
- Location within Vladimir Oblast Location within Russia
- Coordinates: 56°33′N 39°09′E
- Country: Russia
- Region: Vladimir Oblast
- District: Alexandrovsky District
- Time zone: UTC+3:00

Povarovo (Russian: Поварово) is a rural locality (a village) in Andreyevskoye Rural Settlement, Alexandrovsky District, Vladimir Oblast, Russia. The population was 2 as of 2010.

== Geography ==
Povarovo is located 100 km northeast of Alexandrov (the district's administrative centre) by road. Shushkovo is the nearest rural locality.
