= The Lincolnshire Poacher =

Traditional song

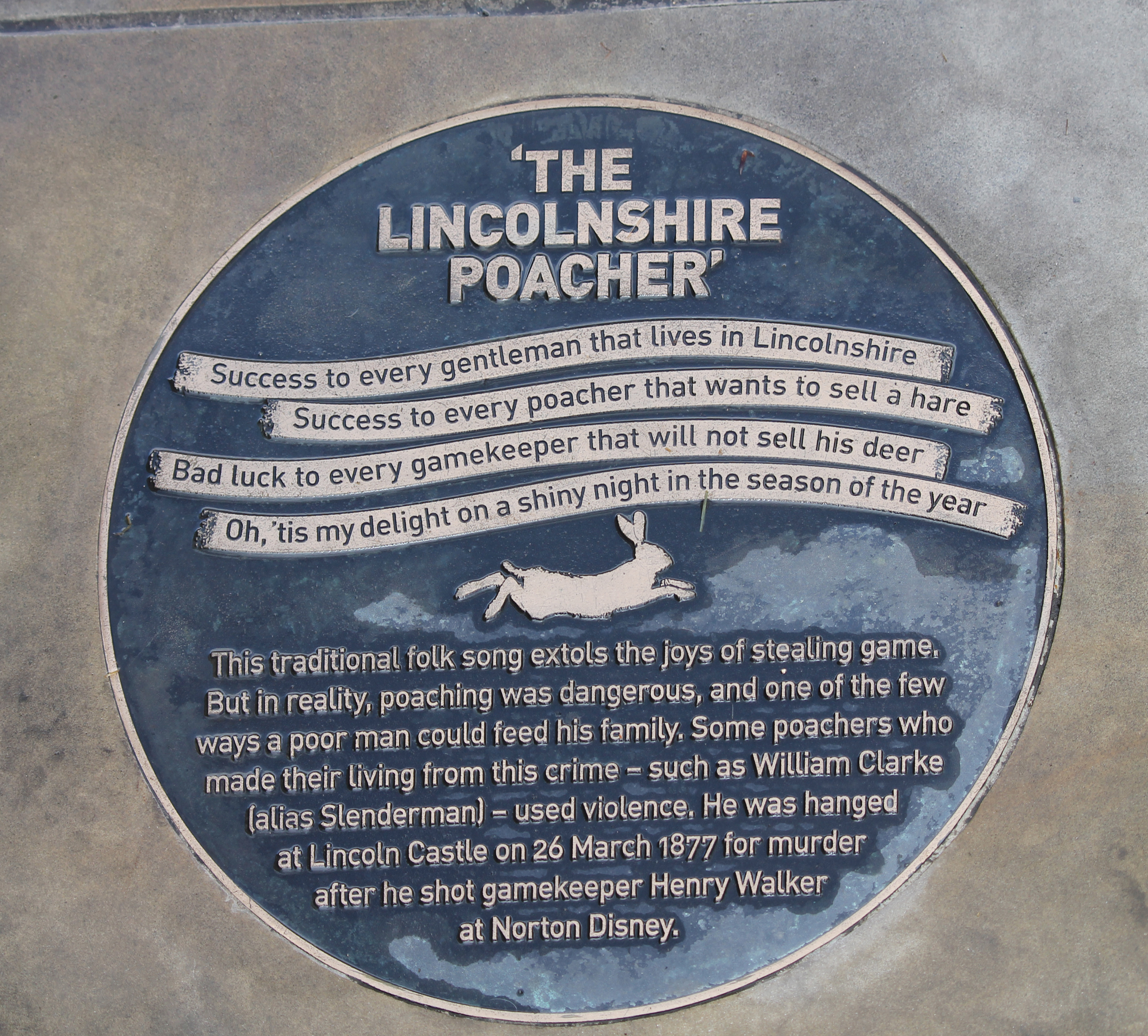
Plaque at Lincoln Castle

"The Lincolnshire Poacher" is a traditional English folk song associated with the county of Lincolnshire, and deals with the joys of poaching. It is considered to be the unofficial county anthem of Lincolnshire. It is catalogued as Roud Folk Song Index No. 299.

== History ==
The earliest printed version appeared in York about 1776. In 1857 it was written; "This very old ditty has been transformed into the dialects of Somersetshire, Northumberland and Leicestershire, but it properly belongs to Lincolnshire." The song is said to have been a favourite of King George IV.

== Usage ==
Lincolnshire Poacher
The interval signal of the Lincolnshire Poacher numbers station, a numbers station that operated from Cyprus from the mid-1970s to 2008

"The Lincolnshire Poacher" was the regimental quick march of the 10th Regiment of Foot and its successors the Royal Lincolnshire Regiment and the 2nd Battalion Royal Anglian Regiment, who are known as "the Poachers". Also, it was the regimental march of the 2nd battalion The Loyal Regiment (North Lancashire). It is the principal musical theme of the quick march of the Intelligence Corps. Prior to 1881 this Battalion had been the 81st Regiment of Foot (Loyal Lincoln Volunteers). It is also the authorised march of The Lincoln and Welland Regiment of the Canadian Forces.

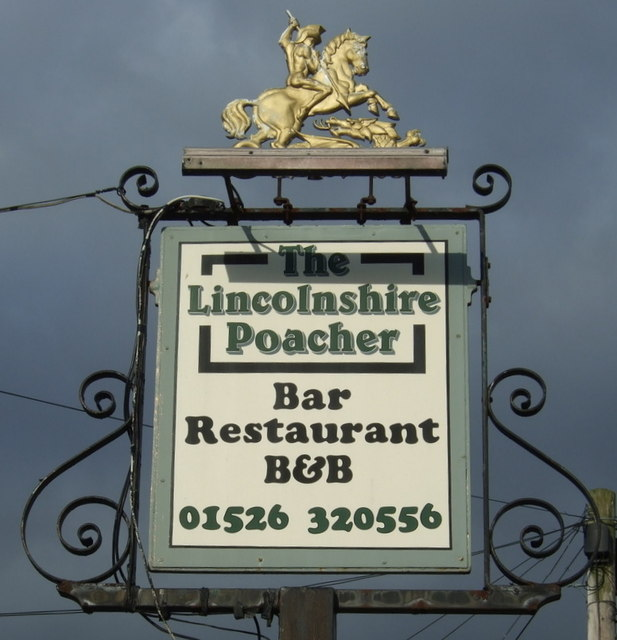
Pub in Metheringham named for the song

The tune was used by many New York Regiments during the American Civil War as "The New York Volunteer".

The Lincolnshire Poacher
This is a composition of "The Lincolnshire Poacher" from a MIDI file to a OGG file.

It was also the marching song for the 20th Battalion, Australian Imperial Force, during the First World War.

When the Royal Air Force College Cranwell, the officer training school of the Royal Air Force, was formed in Lincolnshire in 1919, its first Commandant, Air Commodore C. A. H. Longcroft, sought permission from the then Regimental Colonel of the Lincolnshire Regiment to adopt the march as the quick march of the College.

Anglo-Catholic congregations in the Anglican communion sometimes use the tune as a setting for a hymn sung in procession that begins, "The Happy Birds Te Deum Sing, 'Tis Mary's Month of May."

In 1961, Benjamin Britten arranged the song as no. 3 in Volume Five of British Folk Songs. Frank Newman instrumented the song for four hands on piano. In 1978, the Brighouse and Rastrick Brass Band issued "The Lincolnshire Poacher" as its follow-up single to their successful "The Floral Dance", and it was included on the 1978 album The Floral Dance.

The first two bars of the tune were used as an interval signal on the numbers station known as Lincolnshire Poacher.

BBC Radio Lincolnshire used the melody from the end of the song's chorus as the signature tune for its news jingle when it commenced service in 1980 and in 1988 commissioned UK jingle company Alfasound to write a package of jingles based on the song. Variations on this theme continued until early 2006, and today the station still uses a version with a less pronounced melody from the folk song.

The melody is used in Harold Baum's "The Glyoxylate Cycle" in The Biochemists' Songbook.

The melody was sung in the 1940 film Tom Brown's School Days by the Rugby students and is the theme song of the movie. It was also sung during a hall assembly in the 1951 version.

The melody is used, often with more Irish-themed instrumentation and singing, to create the off-colour folk song "The Chandler's Wife". In this form, it served as the basis for the melody of the 1950 novelty song "The Thing", most famously recorded by Phil Harris.

== Lyrics ==
As is usual with folk songs, the lyrics differ slightly between sources, but the following are typical:

When I was bound apprentice in famous Lincolnshire,
I serv'd my master truly, for nearly seven odd year,
Till I took up to poaching, as you shall quickly hear.
Oh, 'tis my delight on a shining night, in the season of the year.

As me and my companions were setting up a snare,
The gamekeeper was watching us – for him we did not care,
For we can wrestle and fight, my boys, and jump o'er anywhere.
Oh, 'tis my delight on a shining night, in the season of the year.

As me and my companions were setting four or five,
And taking on 'em up again, we took a hare alive,
We plopped her into my bag, my boys, and through the woods did steer.
Oh, 'tis my delight on a shining night, in the season of the year.

We threw him over our shoulders, and wandered through the town,
We called into a neighbour's house, and sold her for a crown,
We sold her for a crown, my boys, but I did not tell you where.
Oh, 'tis my delight on a shining night, in the season of the year.

Success to every gentleman that lives in Lincolnshire (Or: Bad luck to every magistrate)
Success to every poacher that wants to sell a hare,
Bad luck to every gamekeeper that will not sell his deer.
Oh, 'tis my delight on a shining night, in the season of the year.
