= Letter beacon =

Radio transmissions consisting of only a single repeating Morse code letter

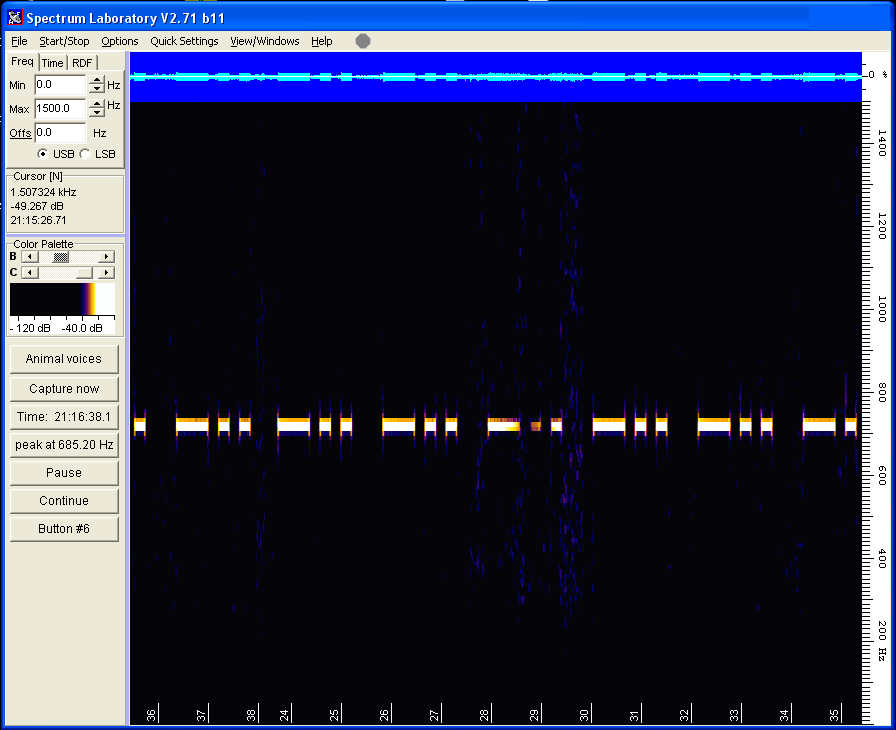
Signal of letter beacon D on 5137.5 kHz

Letter beacons are radio transmissions of uncertain origin and unknown purpose, consisting of only a single repeating Morse code letter. They have been classified into a number of groups according to transmission code and frequency, and it is supposed that the source for most of them is Russia and began during the Soviet Union.

(Some beacons sending Morse code letters are well known directional or non-directional beacons for radio navigation. These are not discussed in this article.)

Letter beacons have been referred to as:

- SLB, or "Single Letter Beacons"
- SLHFB, or "Single Letter High Frequency Beacons"
- SLHFM, or "Single Letter High Frequency Markers"
- Cluster beacons
- MX — an ENIGMA (Note: E.N.I.G.M.A. stands for "European Numbers Information Gathering and Monitoring Association". It was a unique association of radio listeners based in the United Kingdom and active during the 1990s. They issued a printed bulletin every few months, which was mailed to subscribers. All 18 issues of the ENIGMA bulletin contained interesting information about odd and mysterious high frequency transmissions, contributed from radio listeners worldwide. The reception logs were organized, collated and analyzed by the core ENIGMA staff. The coverage was mostly about so-called numbers stations, but there was also some coverage of letter beacons. The ENIGMA bulletins were not archived in libraries and it is difficult to obtain copies today. The major achievement of ENIGMA was the systematic classification and naming of the numerous radio oddities, which were previously described by different and conflicting names in various publications. The original ENIGMA group was disbanded in 2000. In his farewell letter, ENIGMA co-founder Mike G. wrote that all ENIGMA publications and research material would be deposited at the British Library (Boston Spa).) and ENIGMA-2000 (Note: ENIGMA-2000 is an Internet based community with the same general interests as the old ENIGMA association and with wider coverage of general intelligence matters. This group produces a regular newsletter and maintains the old ENIGMA station naming scheme. ENIGMA-2000 shows less interest in letter beacons than its predecessor.) designation.

== Transmission locations ==
These radio transmissions were discovered in the late 1960s. Their presence became known to the wider amateur radio community in 1978, when beacon "W" started transmitting on 3584 kHz, in the 80 meters band. There is indirect evidence that this particular transmitter was located in Cuba.

In 1982, there were also reports, supposedly based on HF direction finding by the US military, that beacon "K" transmitting on 9043 kHz was located at 48°30′N 134°58′E, near the city of Khabarovsk in the USSR. A few years later, it was suggested that the "K" beacons were actually located at Petropavlovsk on the Kamchatka Peninsula and the "U" beacons were located at the Barents Sea coast, between Murmansk and Amderma.

According to D.W. Schimmel, in 1986 the Federal Communications Commission (FCC) released the following HF direction finding results for single letter beacons, all of which indicate locations in the USSR:

| ID letter | Location |
|---|---|
| C | Moscow, Russia |
| D | Odesa, Ukraine |
| O | Moscow, Russia |
| P | Kaliningrad, Russia |
| S | Arkhangelsk, Russia |
| U | Between Murmansk & Amderma, Russia |
| Z | Mukachevo, Ukraine |

The link with the USSR and, more recently, Russia is further supported by the existence of single letter beacons transmitting letters existing only in the Russian Morse code alphabet.

The ENIGMA group also accepted these locations for cluster beacons "C", "D", "P" and "S", adding Vladivostok for beacon "F".

A recent source (2006) regarding locations was published on the Web by Ary Boender. This publication also contains an extensive list of letter beacon frequencies, both current and historical. The following locations are given for cluster beacons:

| ID letter | Location |
|---|---|
| A | Astrakhan, Russia (tentative) |
| C | Moscow, Russia |
| D | Sevastopol, Ukraine |
| F | Vladivostok, Russia |
| K | Petropavlovsk-Kamchatsky, Russia |
| M | Magadan, Russia |
| P | Kaliningrad, Russia |
| S | Severomorsk, Russia |

For solitary beacons and markers, Boender suggests these locations:

| ID letter | Location |
|---|---|
| L | Tirana, Albania (inactive) |
| R | Izhevsk (Ustinov), Russia |
| P | Kaliningrad, Russia |
| V | Khiva, Uzbekistan |

Transmissions of the "P" beacon in December 2007, even on medium frequency (420 and 583 kHz), suggest the Russian naval base at Kaliningrad as a possible source. Kaliningrad officially uses the ITU registered call sign RMP.

== Types ==
The single letter beacons can be classified into two groups, "cluster beacons" and "channel markers". A beacon "P" exists in both groups. A third group, called FSK beacons, is now extinct. The following sections list the beacons active as of December 2007, according to published listeners’ reports.

=== Cluster beacons ===
Radio spectrum screenshot showing cluster beacons "D" on 7038.7 kHz and "C" on 7039.0 kHz

A group of radio beacons with single-letter identifiers ("C", "D", "M", "S", "P", "A" and "K") have been regularly reported near 3594, 4558, 5154, 7039, 8495, 10872, 13528, 16332 and 20048 kHz. The term "cluster beacons" is frequently used for them, as they transmit in parallel on frequencies only 0.1 kHz apart. These beacons transmit only their single-letter identifier in standard CW (A1A) using Morse code.

The following call signs and frequencies of cluster beacons were reported between September 2007 and November 2008 in the Numbers&Oddities newsletter, Utility DX Forum and ENIGMA-2000:

| ID letter | Frequencies (kHz) |
|---|---|
| D | 3593.7, 4557.7, 5153.7, 7038.7, 8494.7, 10871.7, 13527.7, 16331.7, 20047.7 |
| P | 3593.8, 4557.8, 5153.8, 7038.8, 8494.8, 10871.8, 13527.8, 16331.8, 20047.8 |
| S | 3593.9, 4557.9, 5153.9, 7038.9, 8494.9, 10871.9, 13527.9, 16331.9, 20047.9 |
| C | 3594.0, 4558.0, 5154.0, 7039.0, 8495.0, 10872.0, 13528.0, 16332.0, 20048.0 |
| A | 3595.1, 4558.1, 5154.1, 7039.1, 8495.1, 10872.1, 13528.1, 16332.1 |
| F | 7039.2, 8495.2, 10872.2, 13528.2, 16332.2 |
| K | 5154.3, 7039.3, 8495.3, 10872.3, 13528.3, 16332.3 |
| M | 5154.4, 7039.4, 8495.4, 10872.4, 13528.4, 16332.4 |

Occasionally, some cluster beacons (especially "F" and "M") have been reported transmitting on frequencies different from their regular channel for short periods.

=== Solitary beacons and channel markers ===
A second family of letter beacons includes all those operating outside the clusters. For this reason, they are often called "solitary beacons" or "solitaires". They also transmit their single-letter identifier in standard CW (A1A) using Morse code.

A few solitary beacons, like "R" on 4325.9 and 5465.9 kHz, operate exactly like the cluster beacons, sending only their single letter identifier.

However, the majority of solitary beacons, most notably "P" on various MF and HF frequencies, transmit their single-letter identifier in Morse code. Sometimes the routine transmission is interrupted and brief messages are sent in fast Morse code or in an FSK digital mode. Therefore, a more appropriate term for these beacon-like single-letter transmissions is "channel markers", as their purpose is to occupy and identify a particular HF transmission channel when no traffic is transmitted. There is no evidence that the cluster beacon "P" and the solitary beacon "P" are directly related.

It was reported in "Numbers and Oddities", issue 142, that beacon C on 8000 kHz also transmitted messages under the regular call sign RIW, which is allocated to a Russian naval communication station in Khiva, Uzbekistan.

There are also a few oddities transmitting signals with poor modulation and irregular timing, like "V" on 5342 and 6430.7 kHz.

The following call signs and frequencies of solitary beacons and markers have been reported recently (September 2007 to September 2009) in Numbers&Oddities newsletter, Utility DX Forum and ENIGMA-2000:

| ID letter | Frequencies (kHz) |
|---|---|
| R | 4325.9, 5465.9 |
| V | 3658.0, 5141, 5342, 6430.7, 6809, 7027.5, 8103.5, 10202 |
| P | 420, 583, 3167, 3291, 3327, 3699.5, 3837, 4031, 4043, 4079 |
| C | 8000 |

=== FSK beacons ===
This group includes the "K" and "U" beacons, which are no longer active. They transmitted their Morse code single letter identification by shifting the frequency of the carrier by approximately 1000 Hz. This mode of "FSK-CW" is designated F1A. The use of FSK indicated that the transmitter was suitable for FSK data transmissions, like radioteletype.

== ENIGMA designation ==
ENIGMA devised a naming scheme for all stations in their sphere of interest. In the original scheme, the following identifications were issued to letter beacons:

| ENIGMA ID | Description |
|---|---|
| MX | Cluster beacons |
| MXV | Irregular "V" beacons, not in clusters |
| MXS | Solitaires: letter beacons out of cluster bands |
| MXF | FSK beacons (K, U), no longer active in 1995 |

ENIGMA-2000, the Internet-based ENIGMA successor group, revised the original ENIGMA designators. The current designations for letter beacons are the following (since 2007):

| ENIGMA ID | Description |
|---|---|
| MX | Solitary HF single letter beacons |
| MXI | Single letter beacons in clusters |
| MXII | FSK beacons (K, U), no longer active |
| MXV | Irregular "V" transmissions |
| MXP | Letter beacons also sending messages |
| MXIII | (deleted, merged with MX) |
| MXIV | (deleted, merged with MX) |

== Applications ==
The purpose of the letter beacons is not yet known with certainty. Many theories have appeared in specialized publications, but none are based on documentary evidence. They have been postulated to be radio propagation beacons, channel markers, or beacons used in tracking satellites or for civil defense purposes. Some stations of this family, in particular the "U" beacon, have been implicated in deliberate jamming.

According to ENIGMA, cluster beacons are used by the Russian navy (especially its submarine branch) to find the most suitable radio frequency for contact based on current radio propagation conditions.

Robert Connolly also links "P" channel marker with communications facilities at the Russian naval base of Kaliningrad. "P" transmissions carrying Russian navy "XXX" (flash priority) Morse code messages with call signs RPM and RDL further support this view.

== Similar systems ==
A few aero navigation non-directional beacons also transmit single letter identification codes. They can be easily distinguished from letter beacons because they transmit in the allocated low frequency and medium frequency bands; most of them are listed in appropriate aviation handbooks and their transmission mode is A2A (full carrier with audio modulation).

== See also ==
- Types of radio emissions
- Numbers station
- RACON
- Secret broadcast
- Electric beacon
