= Lincolnshire Poacher (numbers station) =

Shortwave radio station

Coordinates: 34°37′05″N 32°56′33″E

- Lincolnshire Poacher Interval signal and number sequence, 2007
- Cyprus
- Broadcast area: RAF Akrotiri, Cyprus
- Frequencies: Several shortwave frequencies between 5.422 and 16.084 MHz

Programming
- Language: English
- Format: Numbers station
- Affiliations: Royal Air Force (speculated)

Ownership
- Owner: MI6 (speculated)
- Sister stations: Cherry Ripe (speculated)

The Lincolnshire Poacher was a powerful British shortwave numbers station that transmitted from HM Government Communications Centre near Gawcott in Buckinghamshire, England, and later from Cyprus, from at least the mid-1970s to July 2008. The station gained its commonly known name as it uses bars from the English folk song "The Lincolnshire Poacher" as an interval signal. The radio station was believed to be operated by the British Secret Intelligence Service. Amateur direction finding linked it with the Royal Air Force base at Akrotiri, Cyprus, where several curtain antennas were identified as being its transmitter. It consisted of a pre-recorded English-accented female voice reading groups of five numbers: e.g., '0-2-5-8-8'. The final number in each group was spoken at a higher pitch. It is likely that the station was used to communicate to undercover agents operating in other countries, to be decoded using a one-time pad.

Cherry Ripe, a numbers station of identical format, is believed to have been broadcast from Guam, and later Australia, for agents working in Asia. Like the Lincolnshire Poacher, it used several bars from its namesake folk song as its interval signal. Cherry Ripe ceased broadcasting in December 2009.

== History ==
The precise date that the Lincolnshire Poacher began broadcasting is not known for certain; however, it is believed that the broadcasts started around the early to mid 1970s. While numbers stations have existed since World War I, numbers stations such as Lincolnshire Poacher began appearing during the Cold War era, when nations such as the Soviet Union and the United Kingdom needed to send messages discreetly to their operatives in other countries. However, after the Cold War, the number of numbers stations greatly decreased. The Lincolnshire Poacher remained operating after the end of the Cold War, and continued to be broadcast into the next two decades.

Akrotiri, Cyprus, the believed location of the Lincolnshire Poacher's broadcasts and radio antennas

The Lincolnshire Poacher ceased broadcasting in July 2008; the final station transmission to be recorded occurred on 2 July 2008. It is believed that the station's sister station, Cherry Ripe, began to send broadcasts that used to be intended to be sent over the Lincolnshire Poacher station. This is believed to be true because the "Cherry Ripe" station used a very similar call signal, and broadcast its messages in 200 sets of five-number IDs.

=== Location ===
Although the usage of numbers stations has not been confirmed by any world government, amateur enthusiasts have traced the location of the Lincolnshire Poacher's signal transmission to RAF Akrotiri, a Royal Air Force base located on the Mediterranean island of Cyprus. The station is believed to have been operated by the British Secret Intelligence Service (MI6) and maintained by the Royal Air Force members that occupy the base in Cyprus.

== Broadcast schedule ==
The Lincolnshire Poacher was broadcast several times throughout the day, and was transmitted seven days a week, at various times and on various shortwave frequencies. This schedule was accurate as of January 2006, which is the most recent update to the broadcast schedule. All times are Coordinated Universal Time (UTC), and all radio frequencies in megahertz (MHz).

	Monday	Tuesday	Wednesday	Thursday	Friday	Saturday	Sunday
12:00	14.487; 15.682; 16.084	14.487; 15.682; 16.084	14.487; 15.682; 16.084	14.487; 15.682; 16.084	14.487; 15.682; 16.084	14.487; 15.682; 16.084	14.487; 15.682; 16.084
13:00	14.487; 15.682; 16.084	14.487; 15.682; 16.084	14.487; 15.682; 16.084	14.487; 15.682; 16.084	14.487; 15.682; 16.084	14.487; 15.682; 16.084	14.487; 15.682; 16.084
14:00	10.426; 12.603; 14.487	12.603; 14.487; 16.314	14.487; 15.682; 16.084	14.487; 15.682; 16.084	14.487; 15.682; 16.084	10.426; 11.545; 14.487	11.545; 14.487; 15.682
15:00	11.545; 13.375; 15.682	7.755; 8.464; 10.426	11.545; 14.487; 16.084	11.545; 12.603; 13.375	11.545; 12.603; 13.375	11.545; 12.603; 13.375	11.545; 12.603; 13.375
16:00	11.545; 12.603; 13.375	11.545; 13.375; 15.682	6.485; 7.755; 10.425	8.464; 12.603; 14.487	11.545; 12.603; 13.375	11.545; 12.603; 13.375	8.464; 10.426; 11.545
20:00	11.545						

== Cultural impact ==
The station features prominently in The Whisperer in Darkness, the second season of the BBC podcast The Lovecraft Investigations, and in the Prime Video series Truth Seekers. It is also the basis for the Torchwood audio drama "The Lincolnshire Poacher", which supposes it is run by a literal hunter from Lincolnshire.
