= Cherry Ripe (numbers station) =

Former shortwave radio station

- Cherry Ripe
- Australia
- Broadcast area: Humpty Doo, Northern Territory, Australia
- Frequencies: Several shortwave frequencies between 18.864 and 21.866 MHz

Programming
- Language: English
- Format: Numbers station
- Affiliations: Royal Australian Navy (speculated)

Ownership
- Owner: Australian Secret Intelligence Service (speculated)
- Sister stations: Lincolnshire Poacher (speculated)

Cherry Ripe is the nickname of a discontinued shortwave numbers station that used several bars from the folk song "Cherry Ripe" as an interval signal. The station, which appears to have commenced transmissions in the late 1960s, is believed to have been controlled by the British Secret Intelligence Service. It is thought to have originally broadcast from a base on Guam (a US territory), but moved to Australia in September 2009.

Broadcasts from Cherry Ripe consisted of an electronically synthesised, English-accented female voice, reading groups of five numbers, e.g. "3-5-7-6-1". The final number in each group was spoken at a higher pitch. It is likely that the station was used to communicate messages to undercover agents operating in other countries, to be decoded using a one-time pad.

A better-known and more active counterpart, known as the Lincolnshire Poacher, also after an English folk song used as its interval signal, was broadcast from the eastern Mediterranean from the early 1970s until 2008. Many aspects of both stations' broadcasts were identical. The Lincolnshire Poacher used the same synthesised female voice and was also suspected as being operated by the UK government. From unofficial triangulation, its location was determined to be RAF Akrotiri, on Cyprus. Cherry Ripe appeared to assume at least part of the role of the Lincolnshire Poacher, after the latter ceased transmission.

In September 2009, the transmitter for Cherry Ripe was moved to Humpty Doo, in Australia. However, in December that year, Cherry Ripe also ceased transmissions.

== Schedule ==
This schedule was accurate as of January 2006. All times are UTC, frequencies in MHz.

	Sunday–Friday
00:10	18.864; 21.866
01:00	19.884; 21.866
10:00	20.474; 23.461
11:00	18.864; 23.461; 14.73
12:00	18.864; 23.461
13:00	18.864; 21.866
14:00	18.864; 20.707
22:00	18.864; 24.644
23:00	18.864; 21.866
