= UVB-76 =

Soviet and Russian shortwave radio station

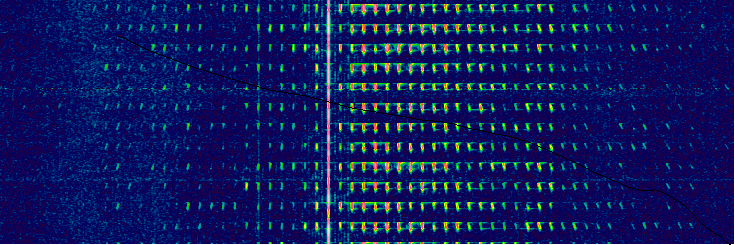
- A spectrogram of UVB-76, showing the suppressed lower sideband
- Soviet Union (1976–1991); Russia (1991–present)
- Frequency: 4625 kHz shortwave

Programming
- Language: Russian
- Format: Repeated buzzing sound

Ownership
- Owner: Russian Armed Forces (allegedly)
- Sister stations: The Pip, The Squeaky Wheel

History
- Former call signs: УЗБ-76 (commonly mistaken to be УВБ-76), МДЖБ, ЖУОЗ, АНВФ
- Former frequencies: 4625.5 kHz

Links
- A short clip of UVB-76's transmission as recorded in Southern Finland, 860 km (530 mi) away from the station in 2002.: file; help

UVB-76 (Russian: УВБ-76;), also known by the nickname "the Buzzer", is a shortwave radio station that broadcasts in upper sideband mode on the frequency of 4625 kHz (wavelength of 64.8 m). It broadcasts a short, monotonous buzz tone, repeating at a rate of approximately 25 tones per minute, 24 hours per day. Sometimes, the buzzer signal is interrupted and a voice transmission in Russian takes place.

While its true purpose has never been revealed, the transmission is not related to the Dead Hand system, despite being sometimes referred to as Doomsday Radio. It has been interrupted and stopped many times yet no retaliatory response – nuclear weapons nor intercontinental ballistic missiles (ICBMs) – has been launched as a result. The best-supported theory is that it is part of a military command network for the Leningrad Military District of Russia.

== Early detection ==
The UVB-76 signal was first detected by shortwave radio listeners, with the earliest preserved recording from 1982 capturing its repetitive tone on the 4625 kHz frequency. Prior to widespread online documentation, the transmission drew attention from radio hobbyists monitoring Soviet-era shortwave bands, though its origin and operators remained unidentified at the time.

== Name and callsigns ==
UVB-76 – "the Buzzer", recorded on 10 August 2022

The station is commonly known as "the Buzzer" in both English and Russian (Russian: Жужжалка, romanized: Zhuzhzhalka). From its first voice transmission in 1997 to 2010, the station identified itself as UZB-76 (УЗБ-76). The callsign UVB-76 was never used by the station itself, but is rather a mistranscription of UZB-76. However, the station is still often referred to by that name. In the following years of transmission, the main callsign of the station changed regularly.

Main callsigns of UVB-76 ("the Buzzer")
Callsign	Timespan used
UZB-76 (УЗБ-76)	24 December 1997 – 7 September 2010
MDZhB (МДЖБ)	7 September 2010 – 28 December 2015
ZhUOZ (ЖУОЗ)	28 December 2015 – 1 March 2019
ANVF (АНВФ)	1 March 2019 – 30 December 2020
NZhTI (НЖТИ)	30 December 2020 – present

In addition to these main callsigns, the Buzzer also uses other "side callsigns" which are being used less frequently than the main callsign. Whenever the main callsign changes, all previous side callsigns are also discarded.

The station transmits using AM with a suppressed lower sideband (USB modulation), but it has also used full double-sideband AM (A3E). The signal consists of a buzzing sound that lasts 1.2 seconds, pausing for 1–1.3 seconds, and repeating 21–34 times per minute. Until November 2010, the buzz tones lasted approximately 0.8 seconds each. One minute before the hour, the repeating tone was previously replaced by a continuous, uninterrupted alternating tone, which continued for one minute until the short repeating buzz resumed, although this stopped occurring in June 2010.

Since the start of broadcasting, the Buzzer broadcasts as a repeating two-second pip.

== Voice messages ==
UVB-76 – "the Buzzer" with a voice message, recorded on 24 January 2013

The buzzing sound is sometimes interrupted by the broadcast of voice messages. These messages are always given in Russian by a live voice, and follow three fixed formats:

UVB-76 – "The Buzzer", recorded on 3 August 2023

=== Monolith ===
- UVB-76 in 1982 on YouTube
- UVB-76 in 1989 on YouTube

A message in the Monolith format always consists of the following parts:

- Callsigns, each of which read out twice in the readout. A callsign always consists of four symbols, each symbol being either a Russian letter or a digit
- Five digit ID groups (number of items usually follows the number of callsigns)
- Message blocks, each consisting of one code word and eight digits

Example of a Monolith message sent on the Buzzer with exactly one callsign, one ID group and one message block (most common type):

NZhTI NZhTI 34 511 GOLOSOK 80 17 81 54

Monolith messages can however contain any number of items from each part:

87OI 87OI A1JZh A1JZh 217O 217O DOTsU DOTsU MSZh7 MSZh7 02 189 44 871 71 132 13 155 27 420 VYMOKAN'Ye 18 97 35 87

87OI 87OI 25 184 GOLOVChATYJ 31 10 33 40 VYeKShA 31 10 33 40

=== Uzor ===
A message in the Uzor format always consists of the following parts:

- Callsigns, each of which read out twice in the readout
- Message blocks, each consisting of one code word and four digits

Example of such a message:

MDZhB MDZhB TsYeNTIM 61 51

After 2023, Uzor messages are rarely sent on the Buzzer.

=== Komanda ===
Komanda is the most uncommon type of voice message. Since it has not been heard for years, messages of this type are most likely not being sent on the Buzzer anymore. They consist of a callsign (read out twice), a codephrase (Russian: ОБЪЯВЛЕНА КОМАНДА, romanized: OB'YaVLYeNA KOMANDA, lit. 'command announced'), and a following number.

Example of such a message:

MDZhB MDZhB OB'YaVLYeNA KOMANDA 135

== Unusual transmissions ==
Distant conversations and other background noises have frequently been heard behind the buzzer; this suggests that the buzzing tones are not generated internally, but are produced by a device placed near a live and constantly open microphone. Because of the occasional fluctuating pitch of the buzzing tones, it is supposed that the tones are generated by a tonewheel as used in a Hammond organ. It is also possible that a microphone may have been turned on accidentally. One such occasion was on 3 November 2001, when a conversation in Russian was heard:

Я – 143. Не получаю генератор... идёт такая работа от аппаратной. (English: I am 143. Not receiving the generator [oscillator]... that stuff comes from hardware room.)

In September 2010, several unusual broadcasts were observed; these included portions of the buzzer being replaced with excerpts from Tchaikovsky's Swan Lake.

Офицер дежурного узла связи "Дебют", прапорщик Успенская. Получила контрольный звонок от Надежды... поняла. (English: "Officer of the duty station 'Debut', ensign Uspenskaya. Received a test call from Nadezhda... understood.")

On 15 May 2020, broadcasts from unknown French-speaking persons were heard.

A short clip of pirates playing "Drugs" by Sonic Mine over the buzzer, recorded on 29 July 2024

In January 2022, various signals with spectrogram-encoded images, visible through a spectrum analyzer, were broadcast on the same frequency. There have also been reports of various songs airing on the station's frequency, many of which were connected to internet memes such as the 2012 K-pop song "Gangnam Style"; a Vice article attributed these broadcasts to pirates hijacking and spamming the frequency. The nationality of the pirates has also come into question by Vice in relation to the 2021–2022 Russo-Ukrainian crisis and Russo-Ukrainian war.

Only on very rare occasions have there been any external civilian communications—unless authorised by the Russian defence ministry—with UVB-76, given its status as a military radio. Instances of deliberate interference and hijackings go largely unreported.

The most recent event occurred under irregular circumstances. During the night of 4 May 2024 at 21:38 (MSK), an unknown Russian-speaking pirate infiltrated the frequency and attempted to contact the station whilst the buzzer was not active, if not on standby. The pirate subsequently asked a series of improvised questions to the station, briefly conversing with the station's operator:

Unknown pirate: А можно шутку рассказать? ... Один «ррр» (звонок) – «да», два – «нет». (English: Can I tell a joke? One "rrr" [buzz] for "yes", two for "no".)

UVB-76 operator: [Two clear buzzes.]

Unknown pirate: Да за что?? ... А музыку включить можно? (English: Well, what for? But can I turn on some music?)

UVB-76 operator: [Two clear buzzes.]

Unknown pirate: Почему!? ... А за такие вопросы вам ничего не будет? (English: But why!? Are you going to get in trouble if you answer my questions?)

[UVB-76 buzzer starts.]

Unknown pirate: Да блин! (English: Well, damn!)

Another incident occurred one day prior to the above event. An unknown pirate—possibly the same one—attempted to subject the buzzer to interference, prompting the on-duty operator to immediately retaliate, taking preventative measures against the signal incursion. The UVB-76 operator combined three individual transmitters, with one above, one below and the other centre 4625 kHz transmitting MS-5 burst, along with CIS-12 modern audio as well as tones in several states, summarising together a highly dense spectral pattern with the upper-side band. Numerous noticeable transitions were witnessed over the 4625 kHz selected spectrogram section, as the operators frantically fought against the pirates. The incident occurred for around half an hour, until the operators ceased their tactics after the pirate abandoned attempts, as the buzzer was then reactivated.

On 30 December 2025, a hijacker broadcast the theme from Swan Lake and a song from the Soviet cartoon The Bremen Town Musicians on the frequency and its Telegram channel. On 31 December 2025 the broadcast was once again hijacked to play Russian rap as well as Western pop songs and 1990s songs. This interruption lasted for over three hours; however, the signal hijackers are unknown.

== Location and function ==
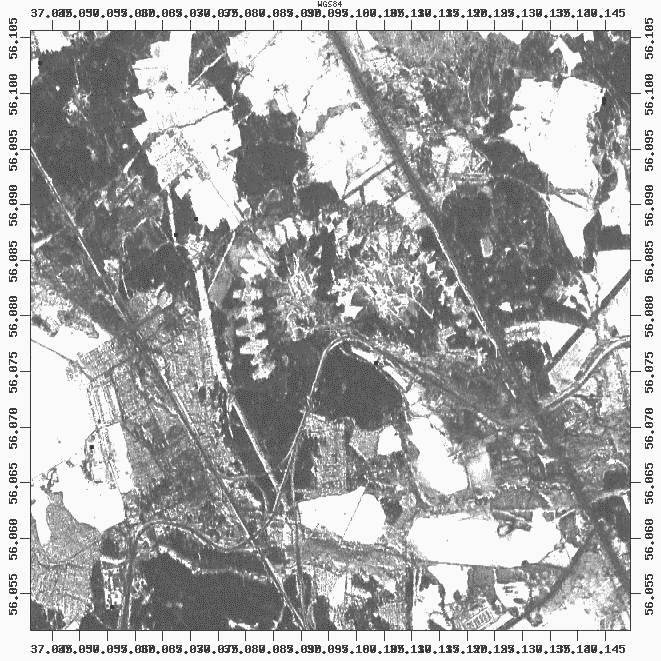
1984 aerial photograph of Povarovo, Russia, former site of the transmitter for UVB-76

The purpose of the station has not been confirmed by government or broadcast officials. However, Rimantas Pleikys, a former Minister of Communications and Informatics of the Republic of Lithuania, has written that the purpose of the voice messages is to confirm that operators at receiving stations are alert. Another explanation is that the broadcast is constantly being listened to by military commissariats.

There is speculation published in the Russian Journal of Earth Sciences which describes an observatory measuring changes in the ionosphere by broadcasting a signal at 4625 kHz, the same broadcast frequency as the Buzzer.

One possible interpretation is that the voice messages constitute military communications. The possibility of the station being a numbers station for intelligence agencies, such as the FSB or the former KGB of the Soviet Union, is considered unlikely by some, since messages occur at seemingly unpredictable times. In addition, the static frequency of 4625 kHz and the low transmitter power are likely unsuitable for reliable long-range communication.

The buzzing functions as a "channel marker" used to keep the frequency occupied, thereby making it unattractive for other potential users. The signature sound could be used for tuning to the signal on an old analogue receiver. The modulation is suitable to be detected by an electromechanical frequency detector, similar to a tuning fork. This can be used to activate the squelch on a receiver. Due to the varying emission properties on shortwave bands, using a level-based squelch is unreliable. This also allows a signal loss to be detected, causing an alarm to sound on the receiver.

Another theory, described in a BBC article, states that the tower is connected to the Russian 'Perimeter' missile system, and emits a "dead hand" signal that will trigger a nuclear retaliatory response if the signal is interrupted as a result of a nuclear attack against Russia. This theory is also unlikely, given that the signal frequently breaks down or is routinely switched off for maintenance.

There are other Russian stations that follow a similar format, for example the two nicknamed "The Pip" and "The Squeaky Wheel". Like the Buzzer, these stations transmit a signature sound that is repeated constantly, but is occasionally interrupted to relay coded voice messages.

The former transmitter was located near Povarovo, Russia, at 56°5′0″N 37°6′37″E which is about halfway between Zelenograd and Solnechnogorsk and 10 kilometres (6.2 mi) northwest of Moscow, near the village of Lozhki. The location and callsign were unknown until the first known voice broadcast of 1997. In September 2010, the station's transmitter was moved to the nearby city of Saint Petersburg, near the village of Kerro Massiv (60°18′40.73″N 30°16′45.06″E). This may have been due to a reorganization of the Russian military. Since 9 August 2015, the station is not transmitting from the Kerro Massiv transmitter site ("Irtysh") anymore, possibly due to a reorganization of the Russian military for the particular area which may cause the frequency to be used only in the Moscow Military District. At present, The Buzzer appears to be broadcast only from the 69th Communication Hub in Naro-Fominsk, Moscow. In 2011, a group of urban explorers claimed to have explored the buildings at Povarovo to find an abandoned military base and, in it, a radio log record confirming the operation of a transmitter at 4625 kHz.

== Other callsigns ==
Besides the main callsign, there have been transmissions containing different callsigns such as:

- LNR4 (Russian: ЛНР4)
- 87OI (Russian: 87ОИ)
- VM62 (Russian: ВМ62)
- A1JZh (Russian: А1ЙЖ)
- MSZh7 (Russian: МСЖ7)
- OMP4 (Russian: ОМП4)
- 7U8T (Russian: 7У8Т)
- VLHN (Russian: ВЛХН)
- 217O (Russian: 217О)
- ANVF (Russian: АНВФ)
- VZhCH (Russian: ВЖЦХ)
- LNRCh (Russian: ЛНРЧ)
- VShchCH (Russian: ВЩЦХ)
- 34ShchK (Russian: 34ЩК)
- YeDGShch (Russian: ЕДГЩ)
- 58Shch1 (Russian: 58Щ1)
- 5Ye27 (Russian: 5Е27)
- M4Z2 (Russian: М4З2)
- 'M4T (Russian: ЬМ4Т)
- 5PTsB (Russian: 5ПЦБ)
- LNTM (Russian: ЛНТМ)
- ZhD9S (Russian: ЖД9С)
- 28YA (Russian: 28ЫА)
- KhIZhJ (Russian: ХИЖЙ)
- 53AJ (Russian: 53АЙ)
- AMVS (Russian: АМВС)
- V'TD (Russian: ВЬТД)
- YeIYJ (Russian: ЕИЫЙ)
- ODVR (Russian: ОДВР)
- TsZhAP (Russian: ЦЖАП)
- ULVN (Russian: УЛВН)
- ULVN YaFUG (Russian: УЛВН ЯФУГ)
- VKhVS (Russian: ВХВС)

== See also ==
- Duga radar (the "Russian Woodpecker")
- Letter beacon
- Numbers station
