= Kirkwood Hospice =

Coordinates: 53.6501°N 1.7391°W

Geography
- Location: Dalton, Huddersfield, West Yorkshire, England

Organisation
- Type: Hospice (Registered Charity No. 512987)

Services

Links
- Website: http://www.kirkwoodhospice.co.uk/
- Lists: Hospitals in England

Kirkwood Hospice is a hospice situated in Dalton, Huddersfield, in West Yorkshire, England. It provides Specialist palliative care for the terminally ill in Kirklees. It was built on the site of the former Mill Hill Isolation Hospital, which closed in 1971

Kirwood hospice provided help and assistance in the formation of the Laura Crane Trust.

== Finances ==
Kirkwood is dependent on private donations and charitable gifts. To help raise funds for patient care the hospice organises annual activities such as the Midnight Memory Walk, which has raised in excess of £200,000 for patient care over the last three years and an "It's a Knockout" style tournament. Other major fundraising events include tandem skydiving.

Patrons of the hospice include author Joanne Harris, world-renowned for bestsellers Chocolat, The Lollipop Shoes, Five Quarters of the Orange, and Runemarks.
