= Joanne Harris =

British author (born 1964)

Joanne Harris OBE FRSL
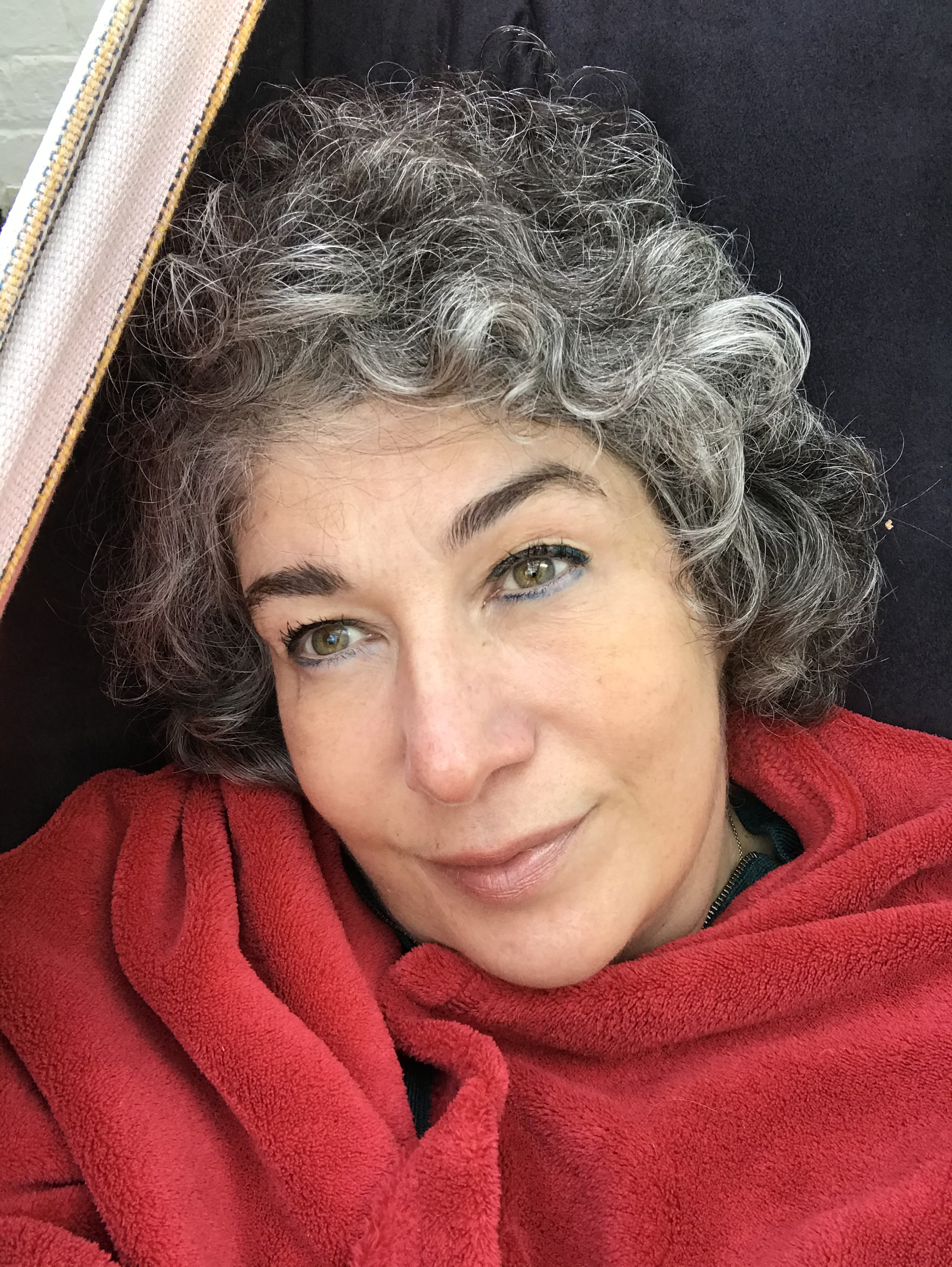
- Harris in 2020
- Born: 3 July 1964 (age 62); Barnsley, West Riding of Yorkshire, England
- Education: St Catharine's College, Cambridge
- Occupations: Writer; Audiobook narrator
- Spouse: Kevin Harris (m. 1988)
- Children: 1
- Writing career
- Pen name: Joanne M. Harris
- Genres: Literary fiction Magic realism Fantasy; Psychological thriller
- Notable works: Chocolat; Blackberry Wine; Five Quarters of the Orange; Gentlemen & Players; The Gospel of Loki
- Joanne Harris's voice Recorded December 2011 from the BBC Radio 4 programme Woman's Hour
- Website: www.joanne-harris.co.uk

Joanne Harris (born 3 July 1964) is a British author, best known for her 1999 novel Chocolat, which was adapted into a film of the same name. Born in Barnsley, Yorkshire, of a French mother and a British father, she was a teacher of French for 15 years and had published three novels during this period before the surprise success of Chocolat enabled her to write full time. Since then she has written over 30 books in a number of genres, including fantasy, psychological thriller, novellas, short stories and non-fiction. Harris's books often feature themes of women's empowerment, folklore, motherhood, community, outsiders and outcasts, and food.

Harris was Chair of the Society of Authors (SoA) for two terms, and was also elected twice to the board of the Authors' Licensing and Collecting Society (ALCS). She is a regular guest on British media, writes regularly for the press and has judged a variety of literary prizes, including the Orange Prize and the Whitbread Prize. Harris's work has received multiple awards, including two Whitaker Gold Awards and one Whitaker Platinum Award, and is published in over 50 countries.

== Early life ==
=== Family ===
Joanne Harris was born on 3 July 1964 in Barnsley, Yorkshire, of an English father and a French mother. Her father, Robert (Bob) Short, taught French and German at Barnsley Girls' High School (later, Hall Balk School for Girls), and her mother was Jeannette Short (née Payen) whom Bob first met on a trip to France, and who later went on to teach at the same school. Until Harris was three years old, the family lived above her grandparents' corner sweet shop. There was an outside toilet and no central heating, which horrified Jeannette, who was used to a warmer climate. Jeannette did not speak English when she married, and so Harris spoke only French until she started school. This contributed to her early sense of the family being "others" in the community. Harris's brother was born when she was ten: because of the wide age gap between them, she describes this as "being an only child and then being a second mother."

Throughout her childhood and up until her grandfather's death in 1988, Harris spent the Easter and summer holidays with her French family on the island of Noirmoutier, where her grandfather had a house, a time she calls "wild and idyllic". She spent much of her time there exploring the island, alone and undisturbed. These experiences later inspired her 2002 novel Coastliners and her 2003 novel Holy Fools.

=== Education ===
Harris attended Wakefield Girls' High School and Barnsley Sixth Form College, then went on to study modern and mediaeval languages at St Catharine's College, Cambridge. She met her husband Kevin via song lyrics and messages carved onto a school desk when they were both students at Barnsley Sixth Form College.

=== Early influences ===
Growing up, Harris was influenced by Norse mythology, classic adventure stories, including those of Jules Verne and Rider Haggard, and the work of Shirley Jackson, Victor Hugo, Ray Bradbury, Mervyn Peake and Emily Brontë. Although comics were banned in the home, she enjoyed Doctor Who and Blake's 7 as well as Westerns, samurai and horror films. As well as being an avid reader, Harris also loved to write, and began by copying the styles of authors she admired. One of the first examples of this was "a kind of Rider Haggard pastiche" called The City of Gold, when she was about seven.

== Career ==
=== Teaching ===
After a year as an accountant, which she later described as "like being trapped in a Terry Gilliam film", Harris trained as a teacher at the University of Sheffield, and for 15 years she taught modern languages, mostly at the independent Leeds Grammar School, which inspired three books set in the fictional grammar school of St. Oswald's. Later she taught French literature at the University of Sheffield. Harris was one of only a handful of female teachers at Leeds Grammar School, which she describes as "a very male, very old environment". She describes several early clashes with members of staff, including with one senior master who berated her for wearing a trouser suit, saying that a dress or skirt would be more appropriate. The next day Harris wore a red miniskirt and platform boots.

While she was a teacher, Harris published the horror/gothic novels The Evil Seed and Sleep, Pale Sister, as well as Chocolat, a literary novel set in a French village, the success of which allowed her to give up teaching to write full-time.

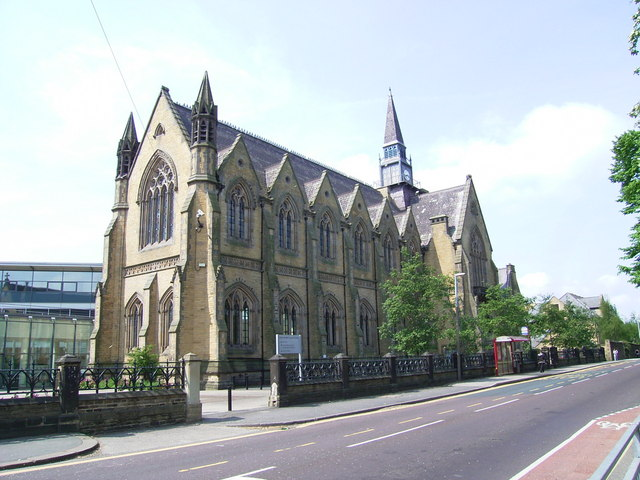
Leeds Grammar School

=== Chocolat ===
Harris describes Chocolat as being very different to her previous books. She was teaching full-time at Leeds Grammar School and had a four-year-old child, but she completed the first draft in four months, stating: "It felt as if I were finding my voice for the first time as an author, and it was exciting and new."

The success of Chocolat came as a surprise to Harris, who had been told by Al Zuckerman, her agent's American counterpart and the author of How to Write the Blockbuster Novel, that her style was "neither fashionable nor commercial" enough to succeed, and that there was no market for "books set in rural France filled with self-indulgent descriptions of food." In an interview with The Yorkshire Post, she states: "I was completely unaware of the genie I was about to release into my ordered little world." Chocolat sold over a million copies, making Harris one of only four women to have sold more than a million copies of a single book in the UK, and went on to sell 35 million copies worldwide. It won a Whitaker Gold Award in 2001 and was shortlisted for the Whitbread Novel of the Year.

In 2000 Chocolat was adapted as a film, starring Juliette Binoche and Johnny Depp, with a screenplay by Robert Nelson Jacobs. The film received five Oscar nominations. Since then Harris's books have been published in more than 50 languages. In 2012 Chocolat was listed as number 61 in The Guardian's list of the "100 top best-selling books of all time".

Chocolat was followed by the novels Blackberry Wine (2000) and Five Quarters of the Orange (2001), described by The Guardian as "quirky, sensuous books set in the French countryside, in which food dominates events as a token of love, a bargaining chip, a gesture of defiance". They were followed by Coastliners in 2002 and Holy Fools in 2003, both of which are set on the fictional French island of Le Devin.

=== Chocolat sequels ===
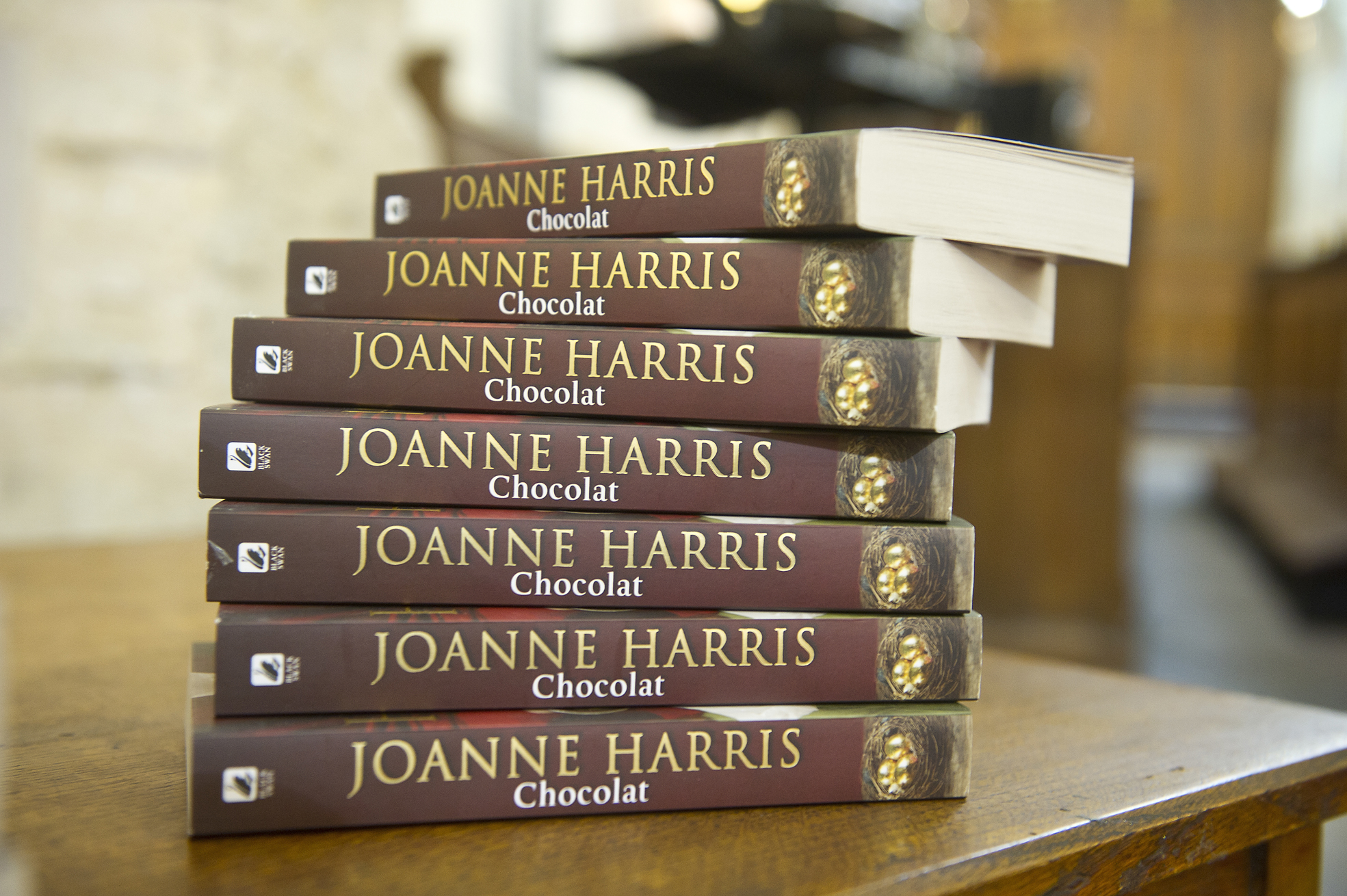
Copies of Chocolat

Although she did not originally intend to write a sequel to Chocolat, Harris has written four further novels in the series: The Lollipop Shoes in 2007 (titled The Girl With No Shadow in the US), Peaches for Monsieur le Curé in 2012 (Peaches for Father Francis in the US), and The Strawberry Thief in 2018. In 2025, Orion Books published a prequel to Chocolat, entitled Vianne.

=== Psychological thrillers ===
In 2006, Harris published Gentlemen and Players, a psychological thriller set in the fictional boys' grammar school of St Oswald's, inspired by her time as a teacher. This was followed by two more St Oswald's books, Different Class and A Narrow Door, both set in the fictional town of Malbry, inspired by her home village of Almondbury, and two more psychological thrillers, Blueeyedboy and Broken Light.

=== Norse mythology ===
Harris discovered the Norse myths as a child via Dorothy G. Horsford’s 1952 retelling for children, Thunder of the Gods. From this, she moved on to Snorri Sturluson’s Prose Edda, then later went on to teach herself Old Norse in order to read the text in the original. In 2007, Harris published Runemarks, a fantasy novel based on Norse mythology, which reimagines a world after Ragnarök, in which some of the gods have survived. The sequel, Runelight, followed in 2012. In 2014 she published The Gospel of Loki, a retelling of the myths from the perspective of the Trickster god, and its sequel, The Testament of Loki, in 2017. Her fantasy novels and novellas were published under the name Joanne M. Harris to distinguish them from her other work.

=== Folklore and fairytale ===
Harris has also published three folklore-inspired novellas, A Pocketful of Crows, The Blue Salt Road, and Orfeia, loosely based on Child Ballads and illustrated by Bonnie Helen Hawkins, as well as two collections of short stories and numerous contributions to various charitable anthologies. In 2021, she published Honeycomb, a collection of original fairytales forming a mosaic novel, illustrated by Charles Vess. In 2024, she published a standalone romantic fantasy novel, The Moonlight Market, described as "a modern fairytale for adults", set in a fictionalised version of London. She has also published a Doctor Who novella, The Loneliness of the Long-Distance Time Traveller. Harris's latest novel Sleepers in the Snow was published in October 2026, having been written in response to the death of the author's father, and is described by Henrietta McKervey in the Irish Times as "a mix of ghost story and personal tragedy".

== Themes and style ==
Repeated themes in Harris's books include: food as a means of understanding character; the dynamic between feasting and fasting; motherhood and the patriarchy; tensions within communities; outsiders and outcasts; religious intolerance and "the magic of everyday things". Her books are often said to evoke scents and tastes.

Many of Harris's books are about women who challenge the status quo and the way in which women are perceived in society. She also regularly uses folklore, ballads and myths in her novels, giving a modern, original spin to traditional stories.

Harris's style is characterized by the frequent use of dual first-person narratives. She has spoken of approaching narrative from a musician's perspective, giving as much emphasis to rhythm and tone as to the novel's plot. She also speaks of the importance of sensory impressions in her work, and of including all the senses. For each of her books she uses a different scent as a writing "trigger", a technique she learnt from Stanislavsky's An Actor Prepares. Of her bilingualism, she says: "French was my first language, but English is the language in which I write. I think this has made me particularly sensitive to certain sounds and cadences, as well as making me more than usually careful about grammar and spelling."

== Reception ==
The books have been praised for their multi-layered storytelling, use of culinary metaphors and arresting plot twists. The Guardian describes Harris's books as "astringent, highly original and often subtly fantastic mainstream novels". The Irish Times says: "The Chocolat novels are poignant literary explorations of universal themes of pleasure and denial, the dangers of dogma, xenophobia and racism and the enduring power of love and understanding to eradicate the traumas of the past," with a Locus review calling Harris "exceedingly gifted at producing vivid imagery". Critics have remarked on her skill at "foreshadowing impending doom" and "unerring eye for school life". Some reviewers have questioned the plausibility of some of her novels' plot twists, while acknowledging the compulsive nature of the read.

== Journalism ==
Harris writes regularly for the press, and has written multiple travel pieces for The Telegraph, The Guardian, The Independent and The Times, as well as articles on literary themes. In 2014 she wrote a review of the British Museum's Viking exhibition for The Telegraph. In 2017 she won a Fragrance Foundation Award for an article on memory and scent, published in Good Housekeeping.

== Other activities ==
=== Music ===
Harris has been involved in a number of musical projects, including collaborating with Lucie Treacher and the Tête à Tête Opera Festival to create two mini-operas, and has co-written an original stage musical, Stunners, with Howard Goodall. She plays bass and flute with the Storytime Band, which she originally joined with her husband Kevin when they were students at Barnsley Sixth Form College, and has developed a stage show based on her work. In 2018 she and the band were guests on the Christmas special of The Verb.

=== Scent ===
Harris has a keen interest in scent, and is a regular judge for the Fragrance Foundation Awards. In 2019 she worked with the fragrance company CPL Aromas to create a scent, Xocolatl, to 'illustrate' a passage from The Strawberry Thief. In 2025 she collaborated with the perfumer Sarah McCartney of 4160 Tuesdays to create Vianne's Confession, a scent made to accompany a passage from her novel Vianne.

=== Prize Judging ===
She has judged the Orange (Women's) Prize, the Whitbread Prize, the Desmond Elliott Prize, the Betty Trask Prize, the Primadonna Prize, the Comedy Women in Print Award and the Winton Prize for Science Books. In 2024 Harris chaired the new Entente Littéraire Prize for Young Adult novels, a joint initiative of Queen Camilla and Brigitte Macron, sponsored by the Royal Society of Literature, and in 2026 she chaired the inaugural Libraro Prize.

=== Media ===
Harris is a regular guest on radio and TV, appearing on Woman's Hour, A Good Read, Front Row, The Verb, The Wright Stuff, Question Time, Loose Ends,With Great Pleasure, Saturday Live, In Tune, and the Today programme. In 2008 she appeared in the TV miniseries The Worlds of Fantasy. She appeared in two episodes of the TV series Inside Out: one investigating the "real story" behind the death of Charlotte Bronte, the other on the topic of faith schools. In 2011 she featured in the episode The Villain of the four-part TV series Faulks On Fiction alongside Sebastian Faulks. In 2016 she appeared in one episode of Christmas University Challenge. In 2021 Harris was a guest on BBC's Desert Island Discs, where her chosen book was the collected works of Victor Hugo, her luxury was her own shed, and the record she "would save from the waves" was Johnny Nash's "I Can See Clearly Now". In 2025 she was interviewed about her career by Jonathan Agnew for BBC Radio 5 Test Match Special. In 2026 she was a judge in the finals of Series 21 of The Great British Menu. She is also active on social media, and in 2016 was nominated for a Shorty Award for her contributions.

=== Charity work ===
Harris is a patron of the charities Médecins Sans Frontières (MSF), to which she donated the proceeds of her cookery books, and Plan UK. In 2012 she travelled to several villages in Togo as part of Plan UK's Because I Am a Girl project, later writing the short story Road Song based on her experiences. In 2009 she travelled to the Congo to report on MSF's work there, spending three weeks with aid workers in the danger zones to write an article on MSF's sleeping sickness programme. Her 2013 short story River Song was based on an encounter during this time. An account of the trip was published in Writing On The Edge: Great Contemporary Writers on the Front Line of Crisis, a collection of essays by writers including Martin Amis, Tracy Chevalier and A.A. Gill, with photographs by Tom Craig. Since 2015 Harris has also been a trustee of the children's creative literacy charity Grimm & Co. in Rotherham.

=== Activism ===
Harris was chair of the Society of Authors (SoA) for two terms from 2020 to 2024, being unanimously re-elected to the position in March 2022. She assisted in several SoA campaigns, including calling for more investment in libraries and the arts, calling for translators to have their names on the cover of books, and raising awareness on author pay and conditions. In 2022 she appeared on the Bookseller's list of the 150 most influential people in publishing.

She has also campaigned against library closures, has called for literary festivals to pay contributors, has spoken out in favour of trigger warnings in books, has spoken out against sexism in publishing, and the gendering of children's books. In 2015, Harris launched a protest against the Clean Reader app, which had been designed to replace profanities in books with "clean" alternatives, calling it "censorship, not by the state, but by a religious minority". This campaign, which was supported by many other authors, including Chuck Wendig, Charles Stross and Margaret Atwood, led to the speedy removal of the app.

Harris is a supporter of trans rights, and in August 2022 was criticized by J. K. Rowling, who had received a threat on Twitter, for failing to show public support for gender critical writers. Harris responded by condemning the threat to Rowling and said that she "fought for the rights of all authors even if she did not agree with their opinions." Later a members' vote was raised calling for Harris to stand down as chair of the SoA in relation to the society's stance on protecting free speech. The motion was defeated, with 81% voting against.

Harris became a member of the Board of the Authors' Licensing and Collecting Society (ALCS) in 2019, and was re-elected in 2021. During this time she campaigned against the unregulated use of generative AI, called for "an industry-wide standard to be introduced" for festivals to pay their contributors, campaigned for a wider awareness of copyright issues and the importance of fair pay for authors. She stepped down from the post in 2024, having served two terms. In 2025 she signed an open letter alongside Richard Osman, Kate Mosse and Val McDermid, calling for the UK government "to hold Meta accountable over its use of copyrighted books to train artificial intelligence."

== Honours and awards ==
Harris is the holder of honorary doctorates in literature from the University of Huddersfield and the University of Sheffield, and is an Honorary Fellow of St Catharine's College, Cambridge. She was appointed Member of the Order of the British Empire (MBE) in the 2013 Birthday Honours and Officer of the Order of the British Empire (OBE) in the 2022 Birthday Honours for services to literature. In 2022 she was made a Fellow of the Royal Society of Literature (RSL). She was also named PinkNews' "Ally of the Year".

=== Literary awards ===
- Chocolat (2001): Shortlisted: Whitbread Novel of the Year Award (2000); nominated, USC Scripter Awards (2001): winner: Whitaker Gold Award (2001); Whitaker Platinum Award (2012).
- Blackberry Wine (2002): Winner; Whitaker Gold Award (2002); (2000) winner of both Foreign and International categories of the Salon Du Livre Gourmand (Gourmand Awards).
- Five Quarters of the Orange (2002): Longlisted for the Orange Prize; Shortlisted: Popular Fiction category WH Smith Literary Award; Winner; Premio Grinzane Cavour (Italy).
- Holy Fools: Longlisted for the Dublin Literary Award.
- The French Kitchen (with Fran Warde): 2005 Winner of the Golden Ladle for Best Soft Cover Recipe Book Over US$25 in Le Cordon Bleu World Food Media Awards.
- Gentlemen & Players (2007): Shortlisted for the Edgar Award Best Novel, (USA) and the Grand Prix du Polar de Cognac (France).
- Flavours of Childhood (co-written for the BBC Radio 4 series First Taste with poet Sean O'Brien): 2006 Winner of the Glenfiddich Award Food and Drink Award for broadcasting.
- The Gospel of Loki (2015): finalist of the Mythopoeic Fantasy Award for Adult Literature.
- Every Scent Tells a Tale (2017): winner of Fragrance Foundation Award (Literary Category).
- A Pocketful of Crows (2018): Shortlisted for the British Fantasy Award for Best Novella.

== Personal life ==
Harris lives in Yorkshire with her husband Kevin, and works from a shed in her garden. The couple have a son, Fred, who is trans. Harris was diagnosed with breast cancer in 2020, and discussed the diagnosis and her ongoing treatment on social media and at the Hay Festival. In 2023, she was declared cancer-free, and wrote in The Guardian that the experience had made her reassess her priorities and had given her back her voice. She has stated that she has a form of synaesthesia "in which colours in bright light trigger scents". She suffers from seasonal affective disorder (SAD) in winter, and has dyscalculia, an inability to process numbers, as well as Dupuytren's Contracture, a medical condition which causes the fingers to stay permanently bent.

== Publications ==
=== Gothic novels ===
- The Evil Seed. Little, Brown. 1992. ISBN 0552775045.
- Sleep, Pale Sister. Random House. 1994. ISBN 9780099270515.

=== Chocolat series ===
- Chocolat. Doubleday. 1999. ISBN 978-0385602983.
- The Lollipop Shoes. Black Swan. 2007. ISBN 978-0385609487. (US title: The Girl With No Shadow)
- Peaches for Monsieur le Curé. Black Swan. 2012. ISBN 978-0385619219. (US title: Peaches for Father Francis)
- The Strawberry Thief. Orion. 2019. ISBN 978-1409170754.
- Vianne. Orion. 2025. ISBN 978-1398710870.

=== Books set in France ===
- Blackberry Wine. Black Swan. 2000. ISBN 0552998001.
- Five Quarters of the Orange. Black Swan. 2001. ISBN 0060958022.
- Coastliners. Black Swan. 2002. ISBN 0552998850.
- Holy Fools (novel). Black Swan. 2003. ISBN 0552770019.

=== Cookery books (with Fran Warde) ===
- The French Kitchen. Doubleday. 2002. ISBN 0385604769.
- The French Market. Doubleday. 2005. ISBN 0385608233.
- The Little Book of Chocolat. Doubleday. 2014. ISBN 978-0857522009.

=== Short story collections ===
- Jigs & Reels. Doubleday. 2004. ISBN 0385606427.
- A Cat, a Hat, and a Piece of String. Doubleday. 2012. ISBN 978-0857521194.

=== Psychological thrillers ===
- Gentlemen and Players. Doubleday. 2006. ISBN 0060559144.
- Blueeyedboy. Doubleday. 2010. ISBN 978-0385609500.
- Different Class. Doubleday. 2016. ISBN 978-0385619233.
- A Narrow Door. Orion. 2021. ISBN 978-1409170815.
- Broken Light. Orion. 2023. ISBN 9781398710825.
- Sleepers in the Snow. Orion. 2026. ISBN 978-1399604796.

=== Rune series ===
- Runemarks. Doubleday. 2008. ISBN 978-0375844447.
- Runelight. Gollancz. 2012. ISBN 978-1473217089.
- The Gospel of Loki. Gollancz. 2014. ISBN 978-1473202351.
- The Testament of Loki. Gollancz. 2018. ISBN 978-1473202399.

=== On writing ===
- Ten Things About Writing. September Press. 2020. ISBN 978-1912836598. Illustrated by Moose Alain.

=== Fantasy and folklore ===
- The Loneliness of the Long-Distance Time Traveller. BBC Digital. 2014. ASIN B00N3Q0U4O. Doctor Who novella.
- A Pocketful of Crows. Gollancz. 2018. ISBN 978-1473222182. Illustrated by Bonnie Helen Hawkins.
- The Blue Salt Road. Gollancz. 2019. ISBN 978-1473222212. Illustrated by Bonnie Helen Hawkins.
- Orfeia. Gollancz. 2020. ISBN 978-1473229952. Illustrated by Bonnie Helen Hawkins.
- Honeycomb. Gollancz. 2021. ISBN 978-1473213999. Illustrated by Charles Vess.
- Maiden, Mother, Crone. Gollancz. 2024. ISBN 978-1399614009. Illustrated by Bonnie Helen Hawkins.
- The Moonlight Market. Hachette. 2024. ISBN 9781399604772.

=== Stories in anthologies ===
- Magic: New Stories. Bloomsbury. 2002. ISBN 978-1869415846. Stories in aid of Piggybank Kids. Edited by J.K. Rowling.
- Bosom Buddies. Black Swan. 2003. ISBN 978-1869415846. Stories in aid of Breast Cancer UK.
- Journey to the Sea. Ebury Press. 2005. ISBN 978-0091900694. Stories in aid of Piggybank Kids.
- Mums: A Celebration of Motherhood. Ebury Press. 2007. ISBN 978-0091922627. Stories in aid of Piggybank Kids.
- Dads: A Celebration of Fatherhood. Ebury Press. 2008. ISBN 978-0091922627. Stories in aid of Piggybank Kids.
- In Bed With... Sphere. 2009. ISBN 978-0751539189. Erotic stories by well-known female writers.
- Because I am a Girl. Vintage. 2010. ISBN 978-0099535928. Charity anthology in aid of Plan UK.
- Stories. Headline. 2010. ISBN 978-0755336609. Fantasy tales, edited by Neil Gaiman and Al Sarrantonio. (Winner of the 2010 Shirley Jackson Award for Best Anthology.)
- Writing on the Edge. Rizzoli International. 2010. ISBN 978-0847832910. A collection of eyewitness accounts by well-known authors of extreme conditions and war-torn locations. In aid of MSF.
- Why Willows Weep. Indiebooks. 2011. ISBN 978-1908041012. Charity anthology in aid of the Woodland Trust.
- Beacons. OneWorld Publications. 2013. ISBN 978-1851689699. Charity anthology in aid of the Stop Climate Chaos Coalition.
- Fearie Tales. Jo Fletcher Books. 2014. ISBN 978-1848663466.
- That Glimpse of Truth – the 100 Finest Short Stories Ever Written. Head of Zeus. 2015. ISBN 978-1784972127. Edited by David Miller.
- Time Trips. BBC Digital. 2015. ASIN B00N3Q0U4O. A collection of Doctor Who stories by various authors, including the Harris novella The Loneliness of the Long-Distance Time Traveller.
- Twice Cursed. Titan Books. 2023. ISBN 978-1803361215. An anthology of stories edited by Marie O'Regan and Paul Kane.

=== Audiobooks narrated by Joanne Harris ===
- Chocolat. Orion Publishing Group. 2018. ASIN B0798WQK7M.
- Blackberry Wine. Orion Publishing Group. 2023. ASIN B0CFVJ4QQ8.
- Five Quarters of the Orange. Orion Publishing Group. 2023. ASIN B0CFRCPNPW.
- Coastliners. Orion Publishing Group. 2023. ASIN B0C3DH5QZM.
- A Cat, a Hat and a Piece of String. Orion Publishing Group. 2012. ASIN B00A3VQFUK.
- Jigs and Reels. Orion Publishing Group. 2023. ASIN B0C3DK58SH.
- Ten Things About Writing. WF Howes Ltd. 2020. ASIN B08PC72XNB.
- The Strawberry Thief. Orion Publishing Group. 2019. ASIN B07GX152HJ.
- The Moonlight Market. Orion Publishing Group. 2024. ASIN B0CNKV2R4W.
- Honeycomb. Orion Publishing Group. 2021. ASIN B08T1MLK2C.
- A Pocketful of Crows. Orion Publishing Group. 2017. ASIN B072YMHHGW.
- Orfeia. Orion Publishing Group. 2020. ASIN B0883F2CK3.
- Vianne. Orion Publishing Group. 2024. ASIN B0DQDPHPQP.
- Sleepers in the Snow. Orion Publishing Group. 2026. ASIN B0H6J9GPFL.
