= B. A. Paris =

Franco-Irish Author

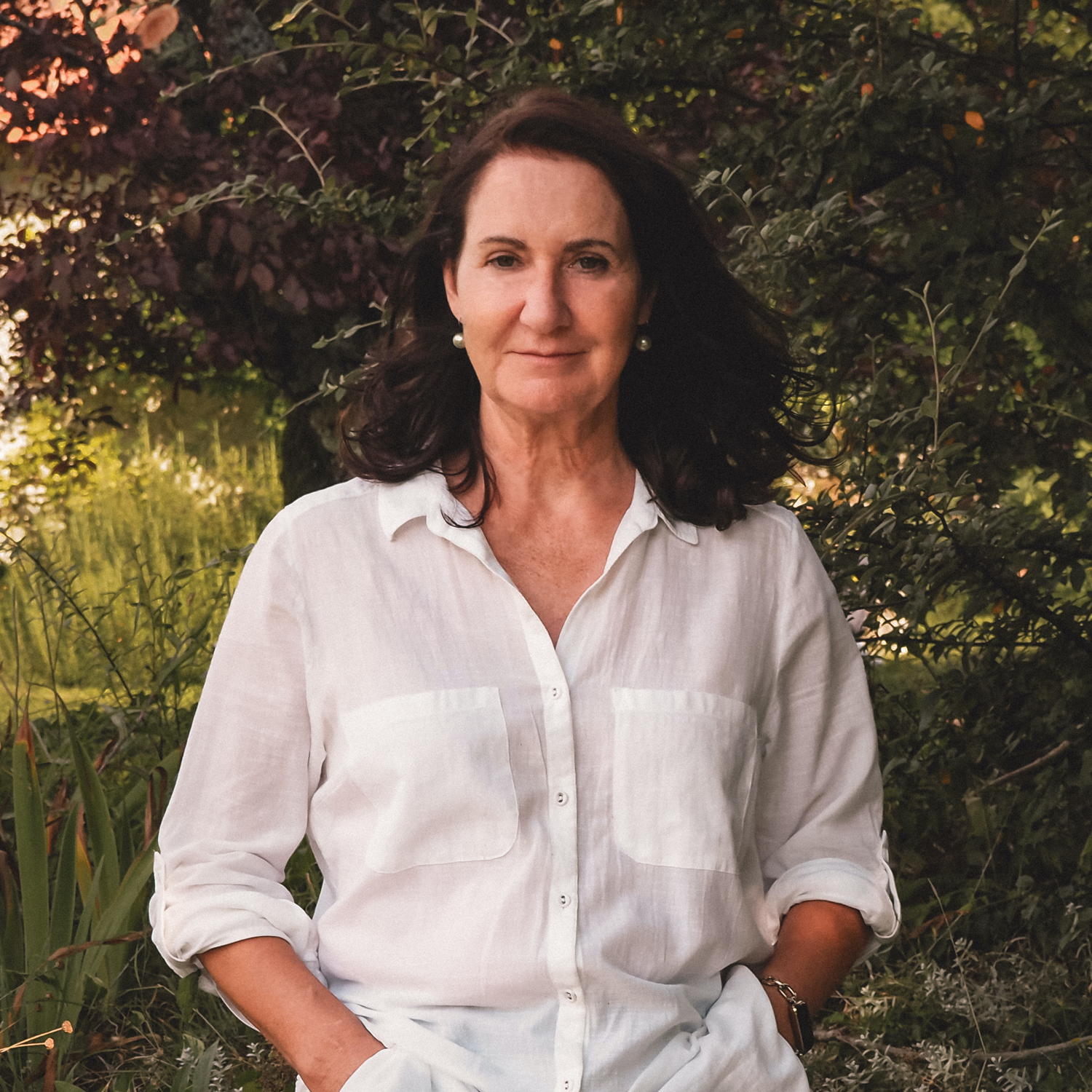
- Paris in 2021
- Born: United Kingdom
- Occupation: Author
- Children: 5
- Writing career
- Genres: Psychological thriller, Family drama, Fiction, Drama, Crime fiction, Suspense, Thriller
- Notable works: Behind Closed Doors (2016), The Breakdown (2017), When I Kill You (2026)
- Website: baparis.com

B.A. Paris is a Franco-Irish author of psychological thrillers and drama novels. She writes under a pen name. Her eight books have sold over nine million copies worldwide, been translated into 41 languages and distributed in 50 territories. Her debut novel, Behind Closed Doors (2016), was an instant New York Times and Sunday Times bestseller, and won the Platinum Nielsen Bestseller Award in 2019 for sales of over one million copies in the UK alone. In 2023, she was named the recipient of a lifetime achievement award in Poland, having sold over 1.3 million copies of her novels in the country, and in 2024 her second book, The Breakdown (2017), was adapted for film as Blackwater Lane. Her latest novel, When I Kill You, was published in 2026.

== Biography ==
B.A. Paris was born in the United Kingdom to a French mother and Irish father, the third of six children. After completing her education, she moved to France, where she spent much of her adult life initially working as a trader at an international bank in Paris before retraining as an English teacher. Together with her husband, she ran a language school while raising their five daughters.

Writing came later in life when one of her daughters suggested she enter a writing competition. Although she did not win, the experience led her to continue writing. Her debut novel, Behind Closed Doors, was published in 2016 and became an instant international bestseller, selling over three million copies in the UK alone and launching her career as one of the most widely read authors in the psychological thriller genre. She is now published by HarperCollins in the UK and St. Martin's Press in the US, and lives in Hampshire, England.

== Novels ==
=== Behind Closed Doors ===
Paris's debut novel, Behind Closed Doors, was acquired in 2014 by her agent Camilla Bolton at the Darley Anderson Literary Agency in London and published in 2016 by HarperCollins in the UK and St. Martin's Press in the US. It became an instant New York Times and Sunday Times number one bestseller. Paris was nominated in the Best Debut Author and Best Mystery & Thriller categories at the Goodreads Choice Awards in 2016, and in 2017, Behind Closed Doors won the Gold Nielsen Bestseller Award for UK sales of 500,000 copies, making Paris the only debut fiction author to win a Gold award that year. The novel went on to win the Platinum Nielsen Bestseller Award in 2019 for sales of over one million copies in the UK alone. More than 6 million copies have now been sold globally since its release.

The novel explores themes of psychological manipulation and coercive control in intimate relationships. Paris has spoken in interviews about being inspired by real accounts of women in controlling relationships. In a Goodreads Q&A in 2017, she noted that she was glad the book had "brought the subject of psychological abuse — which is so much harder to prove than physical abuse — into the open."

=== The Breakdown ===
The Breakdown was published in 2017 and won the Silver Nielsen Bestseller Award in 2025 for UK sales of 250,000 copies. The film and television rights were acquired by Stone Village Productions in 2016 and the film adaptation, titled Blackwater Lane and directed by Jeff Celentano, was released in June 2024 starring Minka Kelly, Maggie Grace and Dermot Mulroney.

== List of Published Works ==
=== Novels ===
- Behind Closed Doors (HarperCollins, 2016; psychological thriller)
- The Breakdown (HarperCollins, 2017; psychological thriller)
- Bring Me Back (HarperCollins, 2018; psychological thriller)
- The Dilemma (HarperCollins, 2020; family drama)
- The Therapist (HarperCollins, 2021; psychological thriller)
- The Prisoner (Hodder & Stoughton, 2022; psychological thriller)
- The Guest (Hodder & Stoughton, 2024; psychological thriller)
- When I Kill You (HarperCollins, 2026; psychological thriller)

=== Collaborative Works ===
- The Understudy with Clare Mackintosh, Sophie Hannah and Holly Brown (Hodder & Stoughton, 2019; psychological thriller)

=== Short Fiction ===
- The Mosquito (Amazon Original Stories, 2023; drama)

== Critical reception ==
=== Praise for Behind Closed Doors ===
Behind Closed Doors received widespread critical acclaim upon its publication in 2016. The Guardian praised it for the way it "twists our expectations of the entire psychological thriller genre”, while The Observer called it "a rollercoaster ride, with plenty of twists." Booklist awarded it a starred review describing it as "one readers won't be able to put down", as did Library Journal calling it "a can't-put-down psychological thriller in the same vein as Gone Girl or The Girl on the Train”. Publishers Weekly described it as a "claustrophobic cat-and-mouse tale" with "contagious" terror, and the Associated Press wrote that "the sense of believability and terror that engulfs Behind Closed Doors doesn't waver." Bestselling author Mary Kubica described it as "a hair-raising debut, both unsettling and addictive — a chilling thriller that will keep you reading long into the night.” and Harriet Tyce called it "expertly plotted and compellingly told", adding that she "raced through it."

=== General Acclaim ===
Paris's writing has been widely praised across her body of work, with her novels being described as "pulse-pounding" by Crime Monthly. Writing for The Toronto Star, Jack Batten described Paris as "a consistent whiz at stitching any number of random events and devious characters into a plot winner." Her books have been noted for their strong word-of-mouth appeal, with Goodreads nominating Behind Closed Doors and The Breakdown for its annual Goodreads Choice Awards in 2016 and 2017 respectively.

== Awards and Honours ==
=== Awards and nominations ===
Year	Country	Award	Category	Work	Result	Ref
2016	United States	Goodreads Choice Awards	Best Mystery & Thriller	Behind Closed Doors	Nominated	
2016	United States	Goodreads Choice Awards	Best Debut Goodreads Author	Behind Closed Doors	Nominated	
2017	United Kingdom	Nielsen Bestseller Award	Gold Bestseller	Behind Closed Doors	Won	
2017	United States	Goodreads Choice Awards	Best Mystery & Thriller	The Breakdown	Nominated	
2017	Poland	Empik Bestseller Award	Foreign Literature	Behind Closed Doors	Nominated	
2018	United States	Goodreads Choice Awards	Best Mystery & Thriller	Bring Me Back	Nominated	
2018	United States	International Thriller Writers	Best Hardcover Novel	The Breakdown	Nominated	
2018	Poland	Empik Bestseller Award	Foreign Literature	The Breakdown	Nominated	
2019	United Kingdom	Nielsen Bestseller Award	Platinum Bestseller	Behind Closed Doors	Won	
2021	Poland	Empik Bestseller Award	Popular Fiction	The Therapist	Won	
2023	Poland	Great Calibre Award	Lifetime Achievement	—	Won	
2024	Poland	Empik Bestseller Award	Popular Fiction	The Guest	Nominated	
2025	United Kingdom	Nielsen Bestseller Award	Silver Bestseller	The Breakdown	Won	

=== Other Achievements ===
- The Prisoner was selected as a Richard and Judy Book Club pick in 2023.
- Behind Closed Doors was included in Dead Good Books' 100 Best Crime Books of All Time in 2020.
- Paris's novels have appeared in Poland's Empik bestseller charts 77 times.
