= The Gospel of Loki =

The Gospel of Loki is a comic fantasy novel by UK author Joanne Harris, published in 2014 by Orion Books. Closely following the original Norse myths, it is a first-person account of the god Loki's recruitment into Asgard by Odin, their various adventures, and the escalating sequence of events that culminates in Ragnarok, the gods' last stand and the destruction of the worlds. It also exists as an audiobook, narrated by Allan Corduner.

== Background ==
In an article for The Scotsman, Harris says that her love of Norse myths began when she was a child, with Thunder of the Gods by Dorothy Horsford, and H.A. Guerber's Myths of the Norsemen. Harris acknowledges these early influences in The Gospel of Loki, as well as the twelfth-century historian, Saxo Grammaticus, and Snorri Sturluson, author of the Prose Edda. Her interest in Norse culture grew when she worked as a volunteer on the historical Jorvik site in York as a 16-year-old.

She cites the 'irreverent humour' and the 'vividness of the characters' as what initially drew her to the myths, saying of the god Loki:

He was always my favourite character, the most intelligent of the group; causing mayhem at every turn; playing tricks on his companions; thwarting their enemies, not through brawn, but through sheer inventiveness. He is the discordant note, the catalyst for action; always on the brink of disaster, and yet, seemingly able to extricate himself from almost any situation.

== Plot ==
Though standing alone as a retelling of the Norse myths, The Gospel of Loki also acts as an accompaniment to Harris's two fantasy books, Runemarks and Runelight, both of which also feature Loki and the Norse gods. It is followed by a sequel, The Testament of Loki.

Although it follows the original myths quite closely, some parts of Loki's backstory and motivation are the author's invention, and the stories have been rearranged to give a more classic narrative structure. The story is told in the first person perspective, from the point of view of Loki, the Trickster, from a time beyond Ragnarok, the End of the Worlds. A deliberately unreliable narrator, he tells the story of the creation of the world, the emergence of the gods, the war between the Aesir and the Vanir, and his own initial recruitment from the realm of Chaos by the duplicitous Odin.Then comes Loki's arrival in Asgard, his many exploits and misadventures, his struggle for acceptance, his repeated failure to integrate into Asgard's society, his fall from grace and his final descent into malice and self-destruction. Meanwhile, Odin, who is already aware, via the Prophecy of the Seeress, of the part Loki will play in the destruction of the Worlds, attempts to hold their community together in the face of increasing hostility to the interloper, but eventually succumbs to the very fate he has attempted to evade.

== Language ==
Loki's voice is deliberately modern, using contemporary slang in order to reach "directly into the spirit of the story."

Writing for The Guardian, Harris says on this subject:

Of all the gods of Asgard, Loki is the subversive, the social and racial outsider; a gender-fluid character in a binary world. It seems appropriate, therefore, for Loki to subvert the epic tradition of prose just as he subverts everything else. It is a gesture of defiance – one of many – against authority, convention, even the rules of storytelling.

== Reception ==
The book was shortlisted for the Mythopoeic Awards, (Adult Fantasy category) in 2014. The Guardian describes it as "a loving, faithful restoration" of the myths and praises Loki's "dark, rancorous, narrative voice," while speculating that: "this book is more likely to delight those whose Loki is the one from the Marvel movies than to satisfy admirers of Harris's astringent, highly original and often subtly fantastic mainstream novels." The Times describes it as "lively and fun":, and The Newton Review of Books says: "Harris writes compellingly to create our appreciation of Loki’s psyche...We are seduced into a shamefaced understanding, even admiration, for his chaotic and very immoral ways."
