= Honeycomb (novel) =

Joanne Harris novel (2021)

- First edition
- Author: Joanne Harris
- Illustrator: Charles Vess
- Cover artist: Sue Gent
- Language: English
- Genre: Fantasy novel
- Publisher: Gollancz
- Publication date: 3 June 2021
- Publication place: United Kingdom
- Media type: Print (Hardback & Paperback)
- Pages: 432 pp (first edition, hardback)
- ISBN: 978-1473213999 (first edition, hardback)

Honeycomb is a 2021 fantasy novel by Joanne Harris, published in the UK by Gollancz, with illustrations by Charles Vess. It takes the form of a mosaic novel, consisting of 100 short chapters, some of which stand alone as short stories, and charts the adventures of the Lacewing King, the cruel but charismatic King of the Faerie, on his journey to redemption. The stories originated on Twitter, as part of a regular series of threads under the hashtag #Storytime. Comparisons have been made to Orwell's Animal Farm as well as to the Brothers Grimm and Charles Perrault, and to the Child Ballads.

== Background ==
Harris devised Honeycomb as a response to the oral tradition of storytelling common in European folklore. She originally used Twitter as her storytelling medium, using the hashtag #Storytime, because she felt that social media was closer to the oral than the written tradition. She wrote some of the stories partly as a comment on unfolding current events, such as Brexit. Olivia Ho, writing for The Straits Times, compares the tone and rhythms of the stories to that of the Brothers Grimm, Charles Perrault and the Child Ballads.

Harris first worked with Charles Vess when Vess was asked to illustrate her short story, The Clockwork Princess, for Enchanted Living, then known as Faerie Magazine. Vess has stated that he was already a fan of Harris' work. He and Harris became friends, and Vess agreed to illustrate Honeycomb.

Harris has adapted some of the stories into a musical stage show with the Storytime Band, alongside friends with whom she has played since she was at sixth form college. Harris and the band were guests on the BBC Radio 3 show The Verb in 2018, performing a story and music from Honeycomb. They performed stories from Honeycomb at Kate Rusby's Underneath the Stars festival in 2018, where the performance was likened to Jeff Wayne's War of the Worlds.

One of the stories from Honeycomb, Clockwork, appeared in 2014 as part of an anthology entitled: That Glimpse of Truth: 100 of the Finest Short Stories Ever Written, edited by David Miller, under the title: The Toymaker and His Wife, published by Head of Zeus.

== Structure ==
Honeycomb is made up of 100 short chapters, many of which stand alone as short stories, and is divided into two parts. The title refers to the interconnected nature of the stories as well as the multiverse in which they are set. It is divided into two sections, Long Ago, which charts the birth and coming-of-age of the Lacewing King within his own kingdom, and Far Away, which follows him on his travels to the world of the Sightless Folk (humans).

== Plot ==
The book is set in the same multiverse as The Gospel of Loki and other fantasy novels by Harris. It begins with the discovery of the nectar of dreams, brought by the bees from the shore of Death, of which the ruler is the Hallowe'en Queen, and which is the source of all stories. It then details the birth of the Lacewing King, son of the Honeycomb Queen, born to rule the Silken Folk (the Faerie), who appear to humans as insects. His father disappears soon after his birth, and he is raised by officials of the Court to take the crown in his father's place. The Lacewing King, who has the power to appear human, but also to transform himself into a cloud of insects at will, grows into a headstrong, clever and occasionally cruel young man who is fascinated by humans (referred to as the Sightless Folk). He seduces the Spider Queen in order to steal her crown of a thousand eyes, which he makes into a coat, and which enhances his power, but in so doing he incurs the eternal hatred of the Spider Queen, who vows to have her revenge. She is joined in this by the Harlequin, a creature of indeterminate gender, whose direct gaze induces madness and who has a long-held grudge against the Lacewing King's absent father. The young Lacewing King also seduces a human girl, whom he then abandons, after which, wishing for an heir, he makes several unsuccessful attempts to find a wife among his own people. He fathers a child (the Wasp Prince) with a human woman, and later seeks to adopt him, but the Wasp Prince challenges him to combat, and the Lacewing King is forced to kill him.

At this point, the Lacewing King is at the height of his power, but remains restless and unsatisfied. He seeks distraction among humans, to discover that the girl he seduced - now an old woman - had a daughter, who died giving birth to a child of her own. This child - the Barefoot Princess - is his granddaughter. Realizing the harm he has done, the Lacewing King takes in the child, leaving her with his coat of eyes as protection, and, after giving orders to his servants to care for her, sets off alone to travel the world.

Protected from harm by his mother's bees, the Lacewing King has many adventures. He intervenes to save a clockwork woman (a character introduced in an earlier tale) from an angry mob of humans, and is promised eternal gratitude from her, and the watchmaker's boy who loves her. He crosses the ocean, and finds himself the prisoner of the savage Dragonfly Queen, who recognizes him and forces him to wager his life on a bet he cannot win. The Lacewing King outwits the Dragonfly Queen, but is captured by the Spider Queen, who has crossed the sea in a ship of her own and is holding the Barefoot Princess captive.The Lacewing King stands trial for his crimes, but is saved from execution by the clockwork woman and her young man, who vouch for him. The Spider Queen, enraged, spins a portal leading to the other side of the world, and pushes the Lacewing King through it. The Barefoot Princess, who loves him, follows him into the unknown.

Alone in a strange ocean, the Lacewing King falls victim to the Queen of the Moon Jellyfish (who appears in a previous story) and is rescued by a builder of boats (also introduced in another story), to whom he now owes a life debt. He agrees to travel with her until the debt is paid. The pair arrive on the shore of a strange country, and, seeking water, the builder of boats is enchanted by the Harlequin, who has been waiting for them. It is revealed that the Harlequin is in fact the Halloween Queen, onetime ruler of the Kingdom of Death, but the Lacewing King's father cheated it of its kingdom and took its place as Halloween King. The Lacewing King redeems the life of the boat-builder with his own and submits to the Harlequin's deadly embrace, but as he is dragged between the Worlds, he breaks free and finds himself in the human world with no memory of who he is. He lives as a vagrant, and defenceless, is captured by a lost tribe of the Faerie, the Moths, who are living under the city. Understanding that he has powers similar to their own, the Moths interrogate the Lacewing King to discover who he is, but blind him in the process. He is left to wander the catacombs under the city, where the lost and dispossessed have found safety, and where the Harlequin, in bird form, finds him and torments him. He is found there by the clockwork woman and the watchmaker's boy, who have been searching for him.

Meanwhile, the Barefoot Princess too has been searching for him, with the help of a human train driver, a woman with whom she has fallen in love. Together, they visit the realm of Death, where the Halloween King tries to trick the Barefoot Princess into remaining. She outwits him, and steals his all-seeing eye, through which she locates the Lacewing King. She uses the Night Train, which ferries the souls of the dead, to reach him, but it crashes on impact. The Halloween King, who has left his realm in search of his stolen eye, catches up with them. He is reunited with his son, the Lacewing King, to whom he gives his all-seeing eye, and passes to him the responsibility of ruling the Kingdom of Death. The Barefoot Princess returns with the train driver to her own land, where they rule as equals. The clockwork woman and her human lover choose to remain on the Night Train in order never to be separated. The Harlequin returns to the Kingdom of Death, where the flower of dreams still lives, and dies, finally at peace.

== Themes ==
The stories in Honeycomb range from the political fable to the morality tale. Themes include those of love, hate and revenge, as well as self-sacrifice, power and the nature of truth. Estelle Roberts, writing for the British Science Fiction Association, attributes some of the book's inspiration to George Orwell's Animal Farm and to the Tales of Hoffmann, praising the author's ability to put a fresh spin on classic themes taken from folklore. Publishers Weekly mentions the political message of some of the connecting tales, and makes a comparison with Aesop's fables and Animal Farm.

== Reception ==
The novel was well-received, earning a starred review from Publishers Weekly, which described it as: "magical, poignant, and wholly transporting", and highlighting it among the "best books of 2021". Writing for Locus, Maya C. James comments on Harris' wide array of subjects, the darkness of the stories and the vividness of her imagery. Writing for Reactor, Angela Maria Spring praises the author's worldbuilding, dark humour and original mythology. Writing for SFF World, Mark Yon comments on the richness of the author's prose and the multilayered nature of the stories.
