= The Moonlight Market =

Joanne Harris novel (2024)

- Author: Joanne Harris
- Language: English
- Genre: Fantasy novel
- Publisher: Gollancz
- Publication date: 2 July 2024
- Publication place: United Kingdom
- Media type: Print (Hardback & Paperback)
- Pages: 288 pp (first edition, hardback)
- ISBN: 978-1399604741 (first edition, hardback)

The Moonlight Market is a 2024 romantasy novel by British author Joanne Harris.

Tom Argent, a young photographer living in London, falls in love with a mysterious woman, and finds himself drawn into a war between two rival groups of urban fairies, who live more or less unseen alongside the city's human inhabitants.

== Background ==
The book is set in Harris's Honeycomb world, which is also that of her novella Orfeia. In an interview, Harris describes how she came up with the story:

Magic can reveal itself in unexpected places. This story came to me on a train to King’s Cross, where my son I chanced to see a moth against the window. Butterflies and moths adapt to suit their surroundings: in cities, they develop a camouflage that reflects an urban environment. What if magical beings did the same? What if the beings we call ‘fairies’ were governed by the same principle?

== Plot ==
Tom Argent is a photographer living and working in London's King's Cross in a shop belonging to a mysterious individual called Mr Burnet. A beautiful woman, Vanessa, comes in to buy a print, and Tom is instantly dazzled by her. The night he arranges to meet her, Tom encounters a group of disreputable people who seem to wish Vanessa harm. Tom defends Vanessa, who escapes. The next day, after taking candid shots of an apparently homeless man (Spider) around King's Cross, Tom develops the photographic negatives in his darkroom to discover images that were not visible to the naked eye. These include shots of a young woman he recognizes from the previous night's encounter, as well as signs advertising a Moonlight Market on Old London Bridge.Tom goes to the market, hoping for news of Vanessa, and finds that the long-demolished bridge (like the magical Market itself) only appears by moonlight.

There, Tom meets Charissa, the woman from his negatives, and learns that he has been to the Market many times before, but that its currency is memory, which means that he has forgotten his previous visits. Charissa is part of a group of urban fairies (Moths) perpetually at war with their enemies, the Butterflies. Both groups prey on the life force (or "nectar") of humans, who they call The Sightless Ones. The war is the consequence of an ancient quarrel between the Butterfly Queen and the Moth King, a once-happy couple who became estranged over the disappearance of their only son. This war can only be ended when a Butterfly once again falls in love with a Moth, a thing both parties have sworn will never happen.

Spider warns Tom to forget about Vanessa, who is dangerous, but Tom is too infatuated to listen. Pursued by both tribes, and with Spider's help, he escapes with Charissa into a previous era of London, where he learns that he is a chrysalis - destined one day to pick a side, and become either a Moth or a Butterfly. He learns that Vanessa is the Butterfly Queen herself, and that his employer, Mr Burnet, is the Moth King. Both sides have an interest in eliminating Tom, who has the power to put an end to the war that gives them their purpose. Still in pursuit of Vanessa, Tom finds himself at the heart of a violent conflict, during which he comes into his power as a Butterfly and realizes, too late, that his infatuation with Vanessa was an illusion and that he really loves Charissa, who has been kidnapped by the Butterflies. Tracking her to the Butterflies' lair, he witnesses a confrontation between the Butterfly Queen and the Moth King, is revealed as their son, the lost Prince, and is finally reunited with Charissa, having brought about the end of the war.

== Themes ==
The novel deals with themes of "inequality and celebrity, the role of memory, the nature of reality and how love can transform," as well as "the everyday magic that is all around us."

== Reception ==
Reviews were mainly positive, with reviewers praising the author's use of language and fantastical lore. Reactor called it: "a perfectly paced gem of a modern fairytale, from a writer of compelling power." Publishers Weekly said: The combination of epic story and fairy tale prose captivates," although Kirkus Reviews called it "a glitzy tale with little substance."
