= Blackberry Wine =

2000 novel by Joanne Harris

- First edition cover
- Author: Joanne Harris
- Cover artist: Stuart Haygarth
- Language: English
- Genre: Magic Realism
- Publisher: Doubleday
- Publication date: 1 May 2000
- Publication place: United Kingdom
- Media type: Print
- Pages: 386
- ISBN: 9780385600590
- OCLC: 60667909
- Preceded by: Chocolat
- Followed by: Five quarters of the orange

Blackberry wine is a magical realism novel by Joanne Harris, published in 2000. This story, which is narrated by a vintage bottle of wine, uses her typical split-narrative technique and follows two separate timelines. One is set in Yorkshire, and follows several formative events in the adolescence of Jay Mackintosh, as he meets Joe Cox, the man who is to become the main influence of his life and literary career. The other, which continues in the present day, is set in the fictional village of Lansquenet-sous-Tannes, the setting of Harris' previous book, Chocolat, and follows Jay's attempts to recapture the magic of those early years, and cure his writer's block.

It also exists as an audiobook, narrated by the author.

== Background ==
Harris has stated that her inspiration for Blackberry Wine came from her Yorkshire grandfather, an ex-miner, who had an allotment. She remembers him working there when she was a child, and making wine from the fruit he grew. After his death, she recovered bottles of this home-made wine in his house, and wrote about them.

== Style ==
The novel is written mostly in the third-person omniscient voice with some incursions into first-person narrative. In the UK version of the novel, this narrator is a vintage bottle of wine. This link between taste and memory has led to the novel being described as "Proustian".

== Plot summary ==
Writer Jay Mackintosh is suffering from writer's block. Having reached his artistic zenith with the award-winning Jackapple Joe, a novel published 10 years ago, he has failed to duplicate his earlier success, and now writes second-rate science-fiction novels under a pseudonym. He lives in London with his ambitious girlfriend, Kerry, and teaches creative writing to vapid young students whilst living on his dwindling reputation. Jackapple Joe, Jay's only best-seller, was a nostalgic retelling of Jay's childhood summers in the Yorkshire town of Kirby Monckton. It is a coming-of-age story, describing how Jay was befriended, following his parents' divorce, by an eccentric old man called Joseph Cox, a gardener, poet and everyday magician, with whom he was to forge a unique relationship. Blackberry Wine acquaints readers with Joe through flashbacks as, now aged 37 and feeling increasingly unfulfilled, Jay revisits his childhood haunts and discovers a box of Joe's "Specials", bottles of home-made wine that may hold the key to Joe's unexplained disappearance.

Under the influence of this magical home-brew, Jay finds himself behaving in a more and more erratic way. He buys a house he has never seen in the French village of Lansquenet-sous-Tannes and moves there, ostensibly to write, but in reality to escape from Kerry, the pressures of fame and the expectations of his public. The estate, Joe's bottles of homemade wine ("The Specials") and vivid memories of Joe that gradually become more than simply memories, inspire Jay to write again for the first time in a decade, and to rediscover what truly matters to him. He begins to write a new book about Lansquenet and its inhabitants, whilst secretly observing his neighbour, the reclusive Marise d'Api, whose land borders his own. This fiercely independent woman lives alone with her deaf daughter, and although she resists all Jay's attempts to get to know her, he becomes increasingly fascinated by her. After weeks of inspired writing, rewarding hard work in his gardens and revisiting the past through Joe's "Specials", Jay comes to feel that the life he is building for himself is more important than writing the great follow-up novel and that self-fulfilment is more alluring to him now than fame and notoriety. He finally gains Marise's confidence following a crisis at her farm, and learns the terrible secret that she has been so desperate to conceal.

However, just as Jay is about to accept that he is falling in love with Marise, his ex-girlfriend Kerry arrives in Lansquenet, having gained access to Jay's whereabouts and the first pages of his new book. Determined to 'redeem' him (and recognising the book's potential) she prepares for a massive publicity stunt, that would reveal Jay's whereabouts to the press. This would re-launch Jay's flagging career; it would also mean that Lansquenet would suffer a damaging influx of tourists that might change the place forever. Jay is torn between his ambition and his growing realisation that he has managed to recapture in Lansquenet the simplicity and magic of his life with Joe, and that he cannot bear to lose it a second time.

To put a stop to Kerry's machinations, Jay burns the sole manuscript of his book and, finally at peace with himself, prepares to begin a new life with Marise.

== Themes ==
The novel deals with themes of food, memory, nostalgia and storytelling, with a focus on "taste, smell and the notion of terroir," as well as that of self-discovery through the senses.

== Characters ==
- Jay Mackintosh is a writer in his thirties living in London. His inability to follow the massive success of his first book has led to a long bout of writer's block, and he is unhappy with his girlfriend, Kerry, whose ambition by far outstrips his own. He is a dreamer, trapped in the past, nostalgic for a vanished time. His parents divorced when he was in his teens, and his one role model, Joe Cox, disappeared in mysterious circumstances twenty years ago. Jay is uncomfortable with who he is; pretending to be someone he isn't; disillusioned by the idea of magic, but secretly desperate to believe.
- Joseph "Jackapple Joe" Cox is the great influence of Jay's young life, a mysterious old man who lives alone. He has a large allotment, in which he grows all kinds of fruit and vegetables, from which he makes jam, preserves and most importantly, wine. A retired coal miner, he is knowledgeable about many things and claims to have travelled all over the world, although his accounts are not always reliable. He is a great believer in what Harris calls "everyday magic", and instills his own sense of wonder into the young Jay Mackintosh. He is passionate about preserving rare species of plants, and has an extensive rare seed collection, which he eventually leaves in Jay's care.
- Marise d'Api is a reclusive young woman who has had her eye on Jay's chateau for a long time, as her own property borders on his. She is a widow, and local gossips claim that her husband committed suicide. She is devoted to her deaf daughter, Rosa, but seems to have no other ties.
- Mireille is Marise's mother in law. A stubborn, unhappy old lady, she detests Marise, believing that she has destroyed her son Tony's life, ultimately driving him to suicide. Another issue between them is that Marise will not let her see her granddaughter, Rosa, as she would like nothing better than to take full custody of her. Whether she believes it or not, Mireille would tell everyone that Rosa is being mistreated.
- Josephine is the owner of a local café. She first appeared in Chocolat, and in this book she plays a minor, yet significant role. She welcomes Jay to the village and gives him important information about his fellow-villagers.
- Kerry is Jay's girlfriend; ambitious, worldly and fashionable. She represents everything that Jay most dislikes about London and the life he is leading there, and yet he finds it hard to escape from her dominant personality.
- Gilly is a traveller girl. Jay meets her during the summer of 1977. She is wild, brave and adventurous; younger than Jay.
- Zeth is a bully and Jay's enemy from his teenage days.

== Settings ==
- Pog Hill (summer 1975, 1976 and 1977)
- London (spring 1999)
- Lansquenet-sous-Tannes (spring and summer 1999)

== Reception ==
F&SF reviewer Charles de Lint praised Blackberry Wine, declaring "there's no easy way to do justice to the curious mix of simplicity and complexity that is a Harris novel." Angela Lambert reviewed it favourably in the Literary Review, and Kirkus Reviews described it as: "a charming fairy tale for grown-ups," although Publishers Weekly criticized its "unbelievable twists."

In 2000, the book won Best Novel in both foreign and international categories at the Gourmand Awards in Périgueux, France.

In 2002, it won a Whitaker Gold Award.

== Release details ==
There have been 32 editions of this book and an audiobook.
