= Coastliners =

2002 novel by Joanne Harris

- Author: Joanne Harris
- Language: English
- Genre: Fiction
- Publisher: Transworld
- Publication date: 2002
- Publication place: United Kingdom
- Media type: Print
- Pages: 386
- ISBN: 9780552998857
- Preceded by: Five quarters of the orange
- Followed by: Holy Fools (novel)

Coastliners is a 2002 novel by the British author Joanne Harris. Set on the fictional French island of Le Devin, it describes the struggle between two rival communities over control of the island's resources. Returning to the island after a long absence, Madeleine Prasteau joins forces with an outsider, Flynn, to revitalize her community, but discovers a family tragedy in the process.

The novel also exists as an audiobook, narrated by the author.

== Background ==
Harris based the fictional island of Le Devin on the French island of Noirmoutier, where her grandfather had a beach house. The title of the novel is taken from the song Can-Utility and the Coastliners, by the rock band Genesis.

On the origins of the novel, Harris writes:

A few years ago I returned to a beach I had loved as a child to find that it had vanished. In the place of the sand there was nothing but a causeway of stones, with a few beach huts towering above them. (...) And that became this story.

== Plot ==
The novel is set on the small island of Le Devin, in France. It begins with the return of a young woman, Madeleine (Mado) Prasteau, to the village of her birth, after a ten-year absence caring for her sick mother. Her father, Grosjean, still lives and works on the island, but has not been in touch with his daughter for years, and the community of Les Salants, of which Mado was once a part, has failed to thrive. Tidal erosion has caused the beach that once was there to disappear, and the fishing industry that made up most of the community's business has almost vanished. By contrast, the rival village of La Houssinière on the other side of the island has become a popular tourist attraction for its hotel and beach, both controlled by the wealthy and scheming Claude Brismand, whose plans to buy up land in Les Salants have become increasingly aggressive.

Mado finds her father uncommunicative and unwelcoming, although he seems friendly with an outsider, Flynn, who has been helping Grosjean in his boatyard. Mado realizes that the new sea wall built by Brismand in La Houssinière is directly responsible for the erosion in Les Salants, but the revelation is met by fatalism from the villagers. Flynn offers to help Mado, and together they hatch a plan to bring back the beach to Les Salants by building a submerged artificial reef. Flynn, whose natural charm allows him to communicate better with the older villagers than the abrasive Mado, engineers the secret project, which soon begins to show results.

As Mado becomes close to Flynn, she struggles to understand her father, who seems afflicted with a kind of selective mutism. A family tragedy is revealed, as well as a secret love triangle involving Mado's mother and Charles Brismand. Mado's sister Adrienne comes to visit with her two sons, causing further tension between Mado and her father. Brismand attempts to destroy the submerged reef in a ploy to safeguard his own beach, and Mado learns that Flynn is Brismand's son, and has been secretly working for him all the time. But when a violent storm breaches the sea wall, the islanders must work together for the first time to combat the flooding. The crisis brings the communities together, and puts an end to the long feud between them.

== Themes ==
The book brings together themes of self-discovery and past secrets, as well as "exploring the inner-workings of community, of who fits in and why," and "the family ties that bind."

== Reception ==
The book was a Sunday Times bestseller, with reviewers praising the vivid descriptions of the island and the satisfying complexity of the plot. Publishers Weekly gave the novel a starred review, calling it "an understated passion play," and praising the "power and grace" of the writing, although The Guardian called it "shallow" and criticised its "hackneyed" depictions of rural France.
