= 2020–21 EFL Championship =

17th season of the Football League Championship

EFL Championship
- Season: 2020–21
- Dates: 11 September 2020 – 9 May 2021
- Champions: Norwich City; 2nd Championship title 5th 2nd tier title
- Promoted: Norwich City; Watford; Brentford
- Relegated: Wycombe Wanderers; Rotherham United; Sheffield Wednesday
- Matches: 552
- Goals: 1,274 (2.31 per match)
- Top goalscorer: Ivan Toney (Brentford) (33 goals)
- Biggest home win: Norwich City 7–0 Huddersfield Town (6 April 2021)
- Biggest away win: Preston North End 0–5 Brentford (10 April 2021)
- Highest scoring: Brentford 7–2 Wycombe Wanderers (30 January 2021)
- Longest winning run: Norwich City (9 games)
- Longest unbeaten run: Brentford (21 games)
- Longest winless run: Derby County; Wycombe Wanderers (11 games)
- Longest losing run: Sheffield Wednesday; Wycombe Wanderers (7 games)
- Highest attendance: 11,689
- Lowest attendance: 1,000

The 2020–21 EFL Championship (referred to as the Sky Bet Championship for sponsorship reasons) was the 5th season of the EFL Championship under its current title and the 29th season under its current league division format.

== Team changes ==
The following teams have changed division since the 2019–20 season:

=== To Championship ===
Promoted from League One

- Coventry City
- Rotherham United
- Wycombe Wanderers

Relegated from the Premier League

- Bournemouth
- Watford
- Norwich City

=== From Championship ===
Promoted to the Premier League

- Leeds United
- West Bromwich Albion
- Fulham

Relegated to League One

- Charlton Athletic
- Wigan Athletic (Note: Wigan Athletic were deducted 12 points by the EFL for entering administration. The club appealed the decision, but it was confirmed on 4 August 2020 that the appeal was unsuccessful. Therefore Wigan were not reprieved from relegation.)
- Hull City

== Stadiums ==
Locations of the 2020–21 EFL Championship teams
Greater London Championship football clubs

Team	Location	Stadium	Capacity
Barnsley	Barnsley	Oakwell	23,287
Birmingham City	Birmingham	St Andrew's	29,409
Blackburn Rovers	Blackburn	Ewood Park	31,367
Bournemouth	Bournemouth	Dean Court	11,364
Brentford	London (Brentford)	Brentford Community Stadium	17,250
Bristol City	Bristol	Ashton Gate	27,000
Cardiff City	Cardiff	Cardiff City Stadium	33,316
Coventry City	Birmingham	St Andrew's	29,409
Derby County	Derby	Pride Park Stadium	33,600
Huddersfield Town	Huddersfield	Kirklees Stadium	24,121
Luton Town	Luton	Kenilworth Road	10,356
Middlesbrough	Middlesbrough	Riverside Stadium	34,742
Millwall	London (South Bermondsey)	The Den	20,146
Norwich City	Norwich	Carrow Road	27,244
Nottingham Forest	Nottingham	City Ground	30,445
Preston North End	Preston	Deepdale	23,408
Queens Park Rangers	London (White City)	Kiyan Prince Foundation Stadium	18,439
Reading	Reading	Madejski Stadium	24,161
Rotherham United	Rotherham	New York Stadium	12,021
Sheffield Wednesday	Sheffield	Hillsborough Stadium	39,732
Stoke City	Stoke-On-Trent	Bet365 Stadium	30,089
Swansea City	Swansea	Liberty Stadium	21,088
Watford	Watford	Vicarage Road	22,200
Wycombe Wanderers	High Wycombe	Adams Park	9,448

== Attendances ==
As with the end to the previous season, the season was affected by the COVID-19 pandemic, resulting in games being played behind closed doors. However, on 19 September 2020, two matches in the division, between Norwich City and Preston North End at Carrow Road, and between Middlesbrough and Bournemouth at The Riverside Stadium, were held in front of 1,000 spectators, as part of EFL pilots.

This was seen as the beginning of fans gradually returning, but a rapid rise of cases from the end of September (eventually resulting in a second nationwide lockdown in November), led to plans being put on hold.

With the second nationwide lockdown ending on 2 December 2020, it was announced England would return to its previous three tier system, with clubs in Tier 2 allowed to host a maximum of 2,000 spectators. The first of these matches took place on 2 December 2020 itself, although the matches of Luton Town and Wycombe Wanderers were capped at 1,000 spectators, as they had not previously held an EFL pilot event.

On Saturday 5 December 2020, Reading, Millwall, Watford, Norwich City and Brentford all hosted matches in front of the maximum allotted 2,000 spectators permitted, with fans in attendance at Brentford Community Stadium for the very first time.

However, it was then announced that from Wednesday 16 December 2020, that London, parts of Essex and parts of Hertfordshire, would move up to Tier 3, the highest tier of restrictions in England, meaning football clubs in these areas, (for The EFL Championship: Brentford, Millwall, Queens Park Rangers and Watford), would revert to playing behind closed doors without fans, due to a rise in coronavirus cases, following a tier review.

It was then announced that from Saturday, 19 December 2020 that Bedfordshire, Berkshire, and Buckinghamshire would also move into Tier 3, meaning for the EFL Championship that Luton Town, Reading & Wycombe Wanderers would also revert to playing behind closed doors without fans again, as of this date. Conversely, Bristol City, who had previously been unable to host fans, would now be able to allow fans back in, with Bristol being downgraded from Tier 3 to Tier 2. As of these updated restrictions, it now meant that only Bournemouth, Bristol City and Norwich City's stadiums would be open to host fans in The EFL Championship. This was reversed on Wednesday 23 December 2020, with Bournemouth the sole team in the division eligible to host fans. A week later on 30 December 2020, Tier 2 was removed in England, with mainland England in either Tiers 3 or 4, meaning once again, no clubs could host fans for the foreseeable future. A third national lockdown in January 2021 meant that fans ultimately were barred from matches for the rest of the regular season. Following an easing of restrictions in May 2021, the play-offs were able to take place in front of crowds of up to 20% of a stadium's capacity.

== Personnel and sponsoring ==
Team	Manager	Captain	Kit manufacturer	Sponsor
Barnsley	(France) Valérien Ismaël	(England) Alex Mowatt	(Germany) Puma	The Investment Room
Birmingham City	(England) Lee Bowyer	(England) Harlee Dean	(United States) Nike	BoyleSports
Blackburn Rovers	(England) Tony Mowbray	(England) Elliott Bennett	(England) Umbro	Recoverite Compression
Bournemouth	(England) Jonathan Woodgate	(England) Steve Cook	(England) Umbro	MSP Capital
Brentford	(Denmark) Thomas Frank	(Sweden) Pontus Jansson	(England) Umbro	Utilita
Bristol City	(England) Nigel Pearson	(Czech Republic) Tomáš Kalas	(Denmark) Hummel	MansionBet
Cardiff City	(Republic of Ireland) Mick McCarthy	(England) Sean Morrison	(Germany) Adidas	Tourism Malaysia
Coventry City	(England) Mark Robins	(Scotland) Liam Kelly	(Denmark) Hummel	BoyleSports
Derby County	(England) Wayne Rooney	(Scotland) David Marshall	(England) Umbro	32Red
Huddersfield Town	(Spain) Carlos Corberán	(Germany) Christopher Schindler	(England) Umbro	Various (home); Yorkshire Air Ambulance / The Town Foundation / Kirkwood Hospice (away and third)
Luton Town	(Wales) Nathan Jones	(England) Sonny Bradley	(England) Umbro	JB Developments (home); Star Platforms (away); Ryebridge (third)
Middlesbrough	(England) Neil Warnock	(England) Jonny Howson	(Denmark) Hummel	32Red
Millwall	(England) Gary Rowett	(Republic of Ireland) Alex Pearce	(Italy) Macron	Huski Chocolate
Norwich City	(Germany) Daniel Farke	(Scotland) Grant Hanley	(Italy) Erreà	Dafabet
Nottingham Forest	(Republic of Ireland) Chris Hughton	(England) Michael Dawson	(Italy) Macron	Boxt ^{2}
Preston North End	(Scotland) Frankie McAvoy	(Republic of Ireland) Alan Browne	(United States) Nike	32Red
Queens Park Rangers	(England) Mark Warburton	(United States) Geoff Cameron	(Italy) Erreà	Senate Bespoke ^{2}
Reading	(Serbia) Veljko Paunović	(Jamaica) Liam Moore	(Italy) Macron	Casumo
Rotherham United	(England) Paul Warne	(England) Richard Wood	(Germany) Puma	Embark Group
Sheffield Wednesday	(Jamaica) Darren Moore	(Scotland) Barry Bannan	(England) Elev8	Chansiri (home); Elev8 (away and third)
Stoke City	(Northern Ireland) Michael O'Neill	Vacant	(Italy) Macron	bet365
Swansea City	(Wales) Steve Cooper	(England) Matt Grimes	(Spain) Joma	Swansea University
Watford	(Spain) Xisco Muñoz	(England) Troy Deeney	(Spain) Kelme	Sportsbet.io
Wycombe Wanderers	(England) Gareth Ainsworth	(England) Matt Bloomfield	(Republic of Ireland) O'Neills	Dreams (home and away); Cherry Red Records (third)

1. Club captain Wayne Rooney retired from playing on 15 January 2021 to manage the club on a permanent basis, having served as interim player-manager since the previous November following the dismissal of Phillip Cocu.
2. Nottingham Forest and Queens Park Rangers' shirt sponsor was Football Index until 12 March 2021 when they entered administration.

== Managerial changes ==
Team	Outgoing manager	Manner of departure	Date of vacancy	Position in table	Incoming manager	Date of appointment
Birmingham City	(England) Steve Spooner (England) Craig Gardner	End of caretaker spell	22 July 2020	Pre-season	(Spain) Aitor Karanka	31 July 2020
Huddersfield Town	(England) Danny Schofield	End of caretaker spell	22 July 2020	Pre-season	(Spain) Carlos Corberán	23 July 2020
Watford	(England) Hayden Mullins	End of caretaker spell	26 July 2020	Pre-season	(Serbia) Vladimir Ivić	15 August 2020
Bournemouth	(England) Eddie Howe	Mutual consent	1 August 2020	Pre-season	(England) Jason Tindall	8 August 2020
Reading	(Wales) Mark Bowen	Mutual consent	29 August 2020	Pre-season	(Serbia) Veljko Paunović	29 August 2020
Barnsley	(Austria) Gerhard Struber	Signed by New York Red Bulls	6 October 2020	21st	(France) Valérien Ismaël	23 October 2020
Nottingham Forest	(France) Sabri Lamouchi	Sacked	6 October 2020	22nd	(Republic of Ireland) Chris Hughton	6 October 2020
Sheffield Wednesday	(England) Garry Monk	Sacked	9 November 2020	23rd	(Wales) Tony Pulis	13 November 2020
Derby County	(Netherlands) Phillip Cocu	Mutual consent	14 November 2020	24th	(England) Wayne Rooney (Note: Rooney was initially appointed as interim manager until the end of the season, but the move was made permanent on 15 January 2021.)	27 November 2020
Watford	(Serbia) Vladimir Ivić	Sacked	19 December 2020	5th	(Spain) Xisco Muñoz	20 December 2020
Sheffield Wednesday	(Wales) Tony Pulis	Sacked	28 December 2020	23rd	(Jamaica) Darren Moore	1 March 2021
Cardiff City	(England) Neil Harris	Sacked	21 January 2021	15th	(Republic of Ireland) Mick McCarthy	22 January 2021
Bournemouth	(England) Jason Tindall	Sacked	3 February 2021	6th	(England) Jonathan Woodgate (Note: Woodgate was initially caretaker manager, but was then appointed as manager until the end of the season on 21 February 2021.)	21 February 2021
Bristol City	(England) Dean Holden	Sacked	16 February 2021	13th	(England) Nigel Pearson	22 February 2021
Birmingham City	(Spain) Aitor Karanka	Resigned	16 March 2021	21st	(England) Lee Bowyer	16 March 2021
Preston North End	(Scotland) Alex Neil	Sacked	21 March 2021	16th	(Scotland) Frankie McAvoy	10 May 2021

== League table ==
Pos	Team	Pld	W	D	L	GF	GA	GD	Pts	Promotion, qualification or relegation
1	Norwich City (C, P)	46	29	10	7	75	36	+39	97	Promotion to the Premier League
2	Watford (P)	46	27	10	9	63	30	+33	91	Promotion to the Premier League
3	Brentford (O, P)	46	24	15	7	79	42	+37	87	Qualification for Championship play-offs
4	Swansea City	46	23	11	12	56	39	+17	80	Qualification for Championship play-offs
5	Barnsley	46	23	9	14	58	50	+8	78	Qualification for Championship play-offs
6	Bournemouth	46	22	11	13	73	46	+27	77	Qualification for Championship play-offs
7	Reading	46	19	13	14	62	54	+8	70	
8	Cardiff City	46	18	14	14	66	49	+17	68	
9	Queens Park Rangers	46	19	11	16	57	55	+2	68	
10	Middlesbrough	46	18	10	18	55	53	+2	64	
11	Millwall	46	15	17	14	47	52	−5	62	
12	Luton Town	46	17	11	18	41	52	−11	62	
13	Preston North End	46	18	7	21	49	56	−7	61	
14	Stoke City	46	15	15	16	50	52	−2	60	
15	Blackburn Rovers	46	15	12	19	65	54	+11	57	
16	Coventry City	46	14	13	19	49	61	−12	55	
17	Nottingham Forest	46	12	16	18	37	45	−8	52	
18	Birmingham City	46	13	13	20	37	61	−24	52	
19	Bristol City	46	15	6	25	46	68	−22	51	
20	Huddersfield Town	46	12	13	21	50	71	−21	49	
21	Derby County	46	11	11	24	36	58	−22	44	
22	Wycombe Wanderers (R)	46	11	10	25	39	69	−30	43	Relegation to EFL League One
23	Rotherham United (R)	46	11	9	26	44	60	−16	42	Relegation to EFL League One
24	Sheffield Wednesday (R)	46	12	11	23	40	61	−21	41 (Note: Sheffield Wednesday received a 12 point deduction for breaching the League's Profitability and Sustainability Rules. This was later reduced to 6 points by an Independent League Arbitration panel.)	Relegation to EFL League One

Source: EFL Official Website
Rules for classification: 1) Points; 2) Goal difference; 3) Number of goals scored; 4) Head-to-head results; 5) Wins; 6) Away goals; 7) Penalty points (sec 9.5); 8) 12-point sending off offences
(C) Champions; (O) Play-off winners; (P) Promoted; (R) Relegated

== Play-offs ==
Semi-finals
3	Brentford	0	3	3
6	Bournemouth	1	1	2
4	Swansea City	1	1	2
5	Barnsley	0	1	1

Final
3	Brentford	2
4	Swansea City	0

First leg

17 May 2021
18:00

Bournemouth	1–0	Brentford
Danjuma 55'	Report

Dean Court, Boscombe
Attendance: 2,000
Referee: Tim Robinson
17 May 2021
20:15

Barnsley	0–1	Swansea City
	Report	A. Ayew 39'

Oakwell, Barnsley
Attendance: 4,000
Referee: Geoff Eltringham

Second leg

22 May 2021
12:30

Brentford	3–1	Bournemouth
Toney 16' (pen.); Janelt 50'; Forss 81'	Report	Danjuma 5'

Brentford Community Stadium, London
Referee: Jarred Gillett
22 May 2021
17:30

Swansea City	1–1	Barnsley
Grimes 39'		Woodrow 71'

Liberty Stadium, Swansea
Referee: John Brooks

=== Final ===
29 May 2021
15:00 BST

Brentford	2–0	Swansea City
Toney 10' (pen.); Marcondes 20'	Report

Wembley Stadium, London
Attendance: 11,689
Referee: Chris Kavanagh

== Results ==
Home \ Away	BAR	BIR	BLA	BOU	BRE	BRI	CAR	COV	DER	HUD	LUT	MID	MIL	NOR	NOT	PNE	QPR	REA	ROT	SHW	STO	SWA	WAT	WYC
Barnsley	—	1–0	2–1	0–4	0–1	2–2	2–2	0–0	0–0	2–1	0–1	2–0	2–1	2–2	2–0	2–1	3–0	1–1	1–0	1–2	2–0	0–2	1–0	2–1
Birmingham City	1–2	—	0–2	1–3	1–0	0–3	0–4	1–1	0–4	2–1	0–1	1–4	0–0	1–3	1–1	0–1	2–1	2–1	1–1	0–1	2–0	1–0	0–1	1–2
Blackburn Rovers	2–1	5–2	—	0–2	0–1	0–0	0–0	1–1	2–1	5–2	1–0	0–0	2–1	1–2	0–1	1–2	3–1	2–4	2–1	1–1	1–1	1–1	2–3	5–0
Bournemouth	2–3	3–2	3–2	—	0–1	1–0	1–2	4–1	1–1	5–0	0–1	3–1	1–1	1–0	2–0	2–3	0–0	4–2	1–0	1–2	0–2	3–0	1–0	1–0
Brentford	0–2	0–0	2–2	2–1	—	3–2	1–1	2–0	0–0	3–0	1–0	0–0	0–0	1–1	1–1	2–4	2–1	3–1	1–0	3–0	2–1	1–1	2–0	7–2
Bristol City	0–1	0–1	1–0	1–2	1–3	—	0–2	2–1	1–0	2–1	2–3	0–1	0–2	1–3	0–0	2–0	0–2	0–2	0–2	2–0	0–2	1–1	0–0	2–1
Cardiff City	3–0	3–2	2–2	1–1	2–3	0–1	—	3–1	4–0	3–0	4–0	1–1	1–1	1–2	0–1	4–0	0–1	1–2	1–1	0–2	0–0	0–2	1–2	2–1
Coventry City	2–0	0–0	0–4	1–3	2–0	3–1	1–0	—	1–0	0–0	0–0	1–2	6–1	0–2	1–2	0–1	3–2	3–2	3–1	2–0	0–0	1–1	0–0	0–0
Derby County	0–2	1–2	0–4	1–0	2–2	1–0	1–1	1–1	—	2–0	2–0	2–1	0–1	0–1	1–1	0–1	0–1	0–2	0–1	3–3	0–0	2–0	0–1	1–1
Huddersfield Town	0–1	1–1	2–1	1–2	1–1	1–2	0–0	1–1	1–0	—	1–1	3–2	0–1	0–1	1–0	1–2	2–0	1–2	0–0	2–0	1–1	4–1	2–0	2–3
Luton Town	1–2	1–1	1–1	0–0	0–3	2–1	0–2	2–0	2–1	1–1	—	1–1	1–1	3–1	1–1	3–0	0–2	0–0	0–0	3–2	0–2	0–1	1–0	2–0
Middlesbrough	2–1	0–1	0–1	1–1	1–4	1–3	1–1	2–0	3–0	2–1	1–0	—	3–0	0–1	1–0	2–0	1–2	0–0	0–3	3–1	3–0	2–1	1–1	0–3
Millwall	1–1	2–0	0–2	1–4	1–1	4–1	1–1	1–2	0–1	0–3	2–0	1–0	—	0–0	1–1	2–1	1–1	1–1	1–0	4–1	0–0	0–3	0–0	0–0
Norwich City	1–0	1–0	1–1	1–3	1–0	2–0	2–0	1–1	0–1	7–0	3–0	0–0	0–0	—	2–1	2–2	1–1	4–1	1–0	2–1	4–1	1–0	0–1	2–1
Nottingham Forest	0–0	0–0	1–0	0–0	1–3	1–2	0–2	2–1	1–1	0–2	0–1	1–2	3–1	0–2	—	1–2	3–1	1–1	1–1	2–0	1–1	0–1	0–0	2–0
Preston North End	2–0	1–2	0–3	1–1	0–5	1–0	0–1	2–0	3–0	3–0	0–1	3–0	0–2	1–1	0–1	—	0–0	0–0	1–2	1–0	0–1	0–1	0–1	2–2
Queens Park Rangers	1–3	0–0	1–0	2–1	2–1	1–2	3–2	3–0	0–1	0–1	3–1	1–1	3–2	1–3	2–0	0–2	—	0–1	3–2	4–1	0–0	0–2	1–1	1–0
Reading	2–0	1–2	1–0	3–1	1–3	3–1	1–1	3–0	3–1	2–2	2–1	0–2	1–2	1–2	2–0	0–3	1–1	—	3–0	3–0	0–3	2–2	1–0	1–0
Rotherham United	1–2	0–1	1–1	2–2	0–2	2–0	1–2	0–1	3–0	1–1	0–1	1–2	0–1	1–2	0–1	2–1	3–1	0–1	—	3–0	3–3	1–3	1–4	0–3
Sheffield Wednesday	1–2	0–1	1–0	1–0	1–2	1–1	5–0	1–0	1–0	1–1	0–1	2–1	0–0	1–2	0–0	1–0	1–1	1–1	1–2	—	0–0	0–2	0–0	2–0
Stoke City	2–2	1–1	1–0	0–1	3–2	0–2	1–2	2–3	1–0	4–3	3–0	1–0	1–2	2–3	1–1	0–0	0–2	0–0	1–0	1–0	—	1–2	1–2	2–0
Swansea City	2–0	0–0	2–0	0–0	1–1	1–3	0–1	1–0	2–1	1–2	2–0	2–1	2–1	2–0	1–0	0–1	0–1	0–0	1–0	1–1	2–0	—	2–1	2–2
Watford	1–0	3–0	3–1	1–1	1–1	6–0	0–1	3–2	2–1	2–0	1–0	1–0	1–0	1–0	1–0	4–1	1–2	2–0	2–0	1–0	3–2	2–0	—	2–0
Wycombe Wanderers	1–3	0–0	1–0	1–0	0–0	2–1	2–1	1–2	1–2	0–0	1–3	1–3	1–2	0–2	0–3	1–0	1–1	1–0	0–1	1–0	0–1	0–2	1–1	—

Updated to match(es) played on 8 May 2021. Source: "Championship Results". Sky Sports.
Legend: Blue = home team win; Yellow = draw; Red = away team win.
For upcoming matches, an "a" indicates there is an article about the rivalry between the two participants.

== Season statistics ==
=== Scoring ===
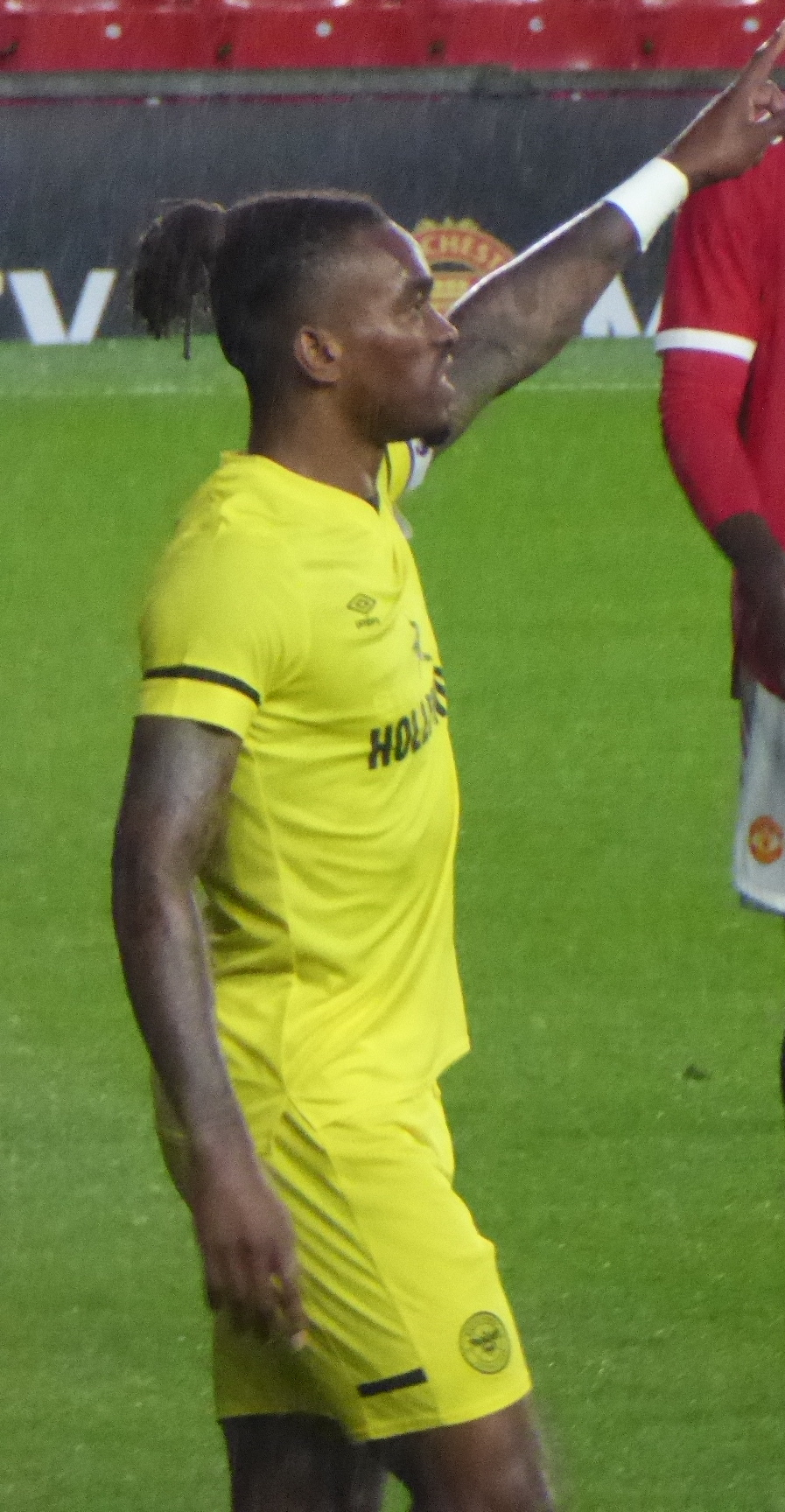
Ivan Toney won The Golden Boot for Brentford in his debut season at the club, scoring 33 goals for The Bees, as they won the play–offs to seal promotion to The Premier League, ending a seventy-four year absence from the top flight.

==== Top scorers ====
Rank	Player	Club	Goals
1	(England) Ivan Toney^{1}	Brentford	33
2	(England) Adam Armstrong	Blackburn Rovers	28
3	(Finland) Teemu Pukki	Norwich City	26
4	(Wales) Kieffer Moore	Cardiff City	20
5	(Angola) Lucas João	Reading	19
6	(Ghana) André Ayew^{2}	Swansea City	17
6	(Netherlands) Arnaut Danjuma^{1}	Bournemouth	17
8	(Argentina) Emiliano Buendía	Norwich City	15
8	(England) Dominic Solanke	Bournemouth	15
10	(Jamaica) Jamal Lowe	Swansea City	14

- ^{1} Includes 2 goals in The Championship play-offs.
- ^{2} Includes 1 goal in The Championship play-offs.

==== Hat-tricks ====
Player	For	Against	Result	Date
(England) Adam Armstrong	Blackburn Rovers	Wycombe Wanderers	5–0 (H)	19 September 2020
(Republic of Ireland) James Collins	Luton Town	Preston North End	3–0 (H)	12 December 2020
(Spain) Sergi Canós	Brentford	Cardiff City	3–2 (A)	26 December 2020
(England) Ivan Toney	Brentford	Wycombe Wanderers	7–2 (H)	30 January 2021
(Finland) Teemu Pukki	Norwich City	Huddersfield Town	7–0 (H)	6 April 2021
(England) Adam Armstrong	Blackburn Rovers	Huddersfield Town	5–2 (H)	24 April 2021
(Wales) Harry Wilson	Cardiff City	Birmingham City	4–0 (A)	1 May 2021
(England) Adam Armstrong	Blackburn Rovers	Birmingham City	5–2 (H)	8 May 2021

=== Clean sheets ===
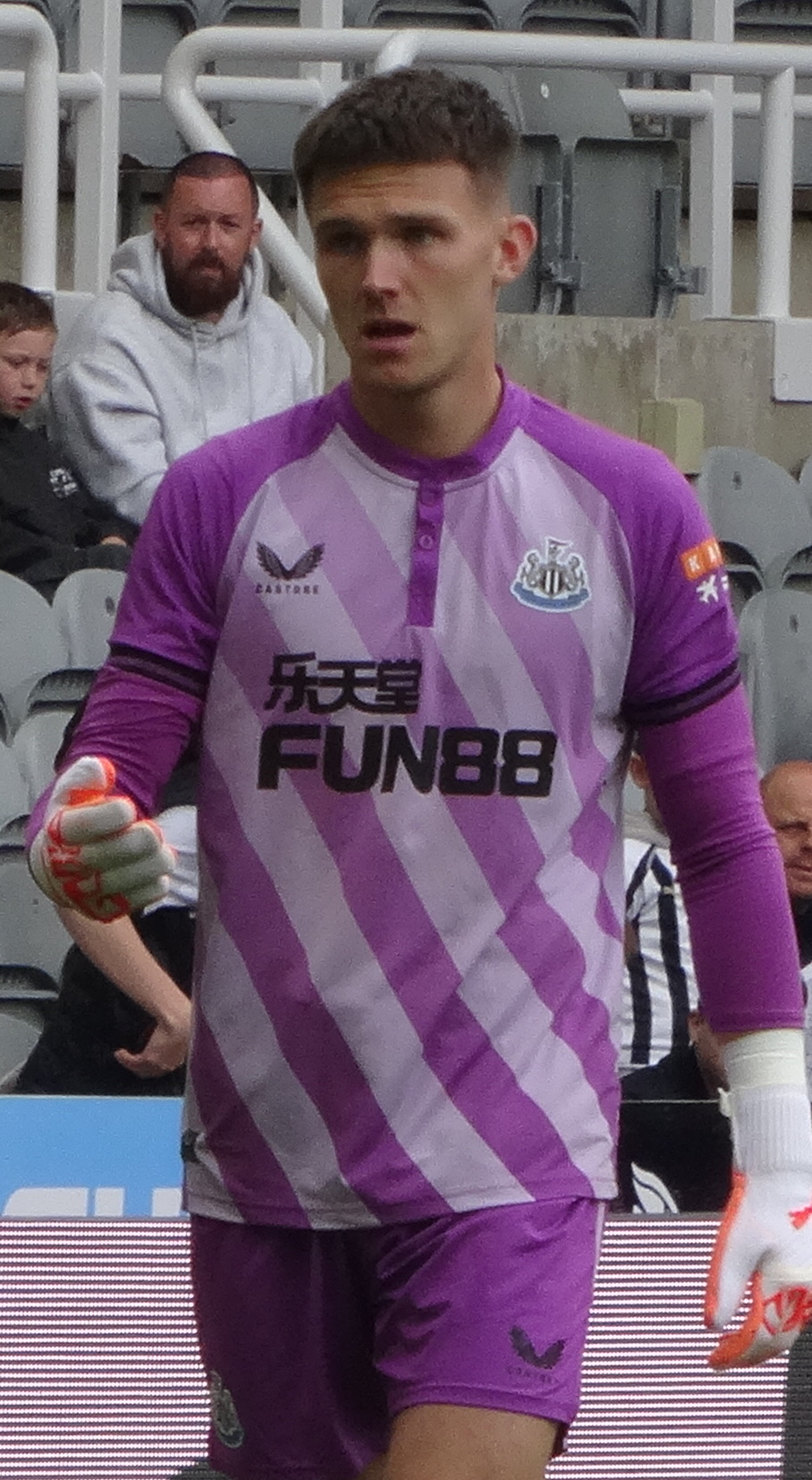
Freddie Woodman won The Golden Glove this season with 21 clean sheets, as he helped Swansea City reach the play-off final, whilst on loan from Premier League club Newcastle United.

Rank	Player	Club	Clean sheets
1	(England) Freddie Woodman^{1}	Swansea City	21
2	(Poland) Bartosz Białkowski	Millwall	17
2	(Netherlands) Tim Krul	Norwich City	17
2	(Brazil) Rafael	Reading	17
5	(Bosnia and Herzegovina) Asmir Begović^{1}	Bournemouth	16
5	(Spain) David Raya	Brentford	16
7	(France) Brice Samba	Nottingham Forest	14
8	(Austria) Daniel Bachmann	Watford	13
8	(England) Marcus Bettinelli	Middlesbrough	13
8	(Philippines) Neil Etheridge	Birmingham City	13

- ^{1} Includes 1 clean sheet in The Championship play-offs.

=== Discipline ===
==== Players ====
- Most yellow cards: 12
  - (England) Nathaniel Chalobah (Watford)
  - (England) Michael Ihiekwe (Rotherham United)
  - (Colombia) Jefferson Lerma^{1} (Bournemouth)
- Most red cards: 2
  - (Argentina) Emiliano Buendía (Norwich City)
  - (England) Kyle McFadzean (Coventry City)
- ^{1} Includes 1 yellow card in The Championship play-offs.

==== Club ====
- Most yellow cards: 80
  - Rotherham United
  - Watford
- Most red cards: 7
  - Sheffield Wednesday

== Awards ==
=== Monthly ===
Month	Manager of the Month		Player of the Month		Reference
September	(Serbia) Veljko Paunović	Reading	(England) Bradley Johnson	Blackburn Rovers	
October	(England) Neil Warnock	Middlesbrough	(England) Ivan Toney	Brentford	
November	(Serbia) Vladimir Ivić	Watford	(Wales) David Brooks	Bournemouth	
December	(Denmark) Thomas Frank	Brentford	(England) Duncan Watmore	Middlesbrough	
January	(Wales) Steve Cooper	Swansea City	(England) Matt Crooks	Rotherham United	
February	(Republic of Ireland) Mick McCarthy	Cardiff City	(Finland) Teemu Pukki	Norwich City	
March	(Spain) Xisco Muñoz	Watford	(England) Alex Mowatt	Barnsley	
April	(England) Jonathan Woodgate	Bournemouth	(Netherlands) Arnaut Danjuma	Bournemouth	

=== Annual ===
Award	Winner	Club
Player of the Season	(Argentina) Emiliano Buendía	Norwich City
Young Player of the Season	(France) Michael Olise	Reading

Championship Team of the season

Pos.	Player	Club	Ref.
GK	(Bosnia and Herzegovina) Asmir Begović	Bournemouth	
DF	(England) Max Aarons	Norwich City	
DF	(Scotland) Grant Hanley	Norwich City	
DF	(England) Sean Morrison	Cardiff City	
DF	(Morocco) Adam Masina	Watford	
MF	(Argentina) Emiliano Buendía	Norwich City	
MF	(France) Michael Olise	Reading	
MF	(England) Alex Mowatt	Barnsley	
FW	(Netherlands) Arnaut Danjuma	Bournemouth	
FW	(England) Ivan Toney	Brentford	
FW	(Finland) Teemu Pukki	Norwich City	
Manager	(Germany) Daniel Farke	Norwich City	

=== PFA Championship Team of the Year ===
Pos.	Player	Club
GK	(Netherlands) Tim Krul	Norwich City
DF	(England) Max Aarons	Norwich City
DF	(Jamaica) Ethan Pinnock	Brentford
DF	(Scotland) Grant Hanley	Norwich City
DF	(Jamaica) Rico Henry	Brentford
MF	(Argentina) Emiliano Buendía	Norwich City
MF	(France) Michael Olise	Reading
MF	(England) Oliver Skipp	Norwich City
FW	(England) Adam Armstrong	Blackburn Rovers
FW	(England) Ivan Toney	Brentford
FW	(Finland) Teemu Pukki	Norwich City
