= Holy Fools (novel) =

2003 novel by Joanne Harris

- Author: Joanne Harris
- Language: English
- Genre: Novel, historical fiction
- Publisher: Doubleday
- Publication date: April 2003
- Publication place: United Kingdom
- Media type: Print (hardback & paperback)

Holy Fools is a 2003 historical novel by British author Joanne Harris.

Set in France during the first decade of the 17th century, it follows the adventures of Juliette, a former street performer and adventuress, who, for her own safety and that of her young daughter Fleur, joins an island convent, posing as a widow. The kindly Abbess takes them in, but when the old Abbess dies, she is replaced by a twelve-year old noblewoman, intent on reforming the abbey. The new Abbess arrives accompanied by her confessor, Père Colombin, who reveals himself to be Juliette's former lover Guy LeMerle, a manipulative charlatan now posing as a priest as part of a complicated attempt at revenge against an old enemy. Unable to reveal his identity without putting her daughter in danger, Juliette must outwit LeMerle before his daring scheme plunges the whole convent into chaos.

== Background ==
Harris states that the idea for the book came to her from a reference in a French history text, describing "the stringent reform of an abbey in Port-Royal by a newly-appointed Mother Superior of only eleven years of age." She also states that she was put under pressure to change some of the darker elements of the novel, especially the character of the ruthless and unrepentant LeMerle, but that she resisted this, seeing him not just as a villain, but as "a kind of existential hero."

== Plot ==
The story begins in France in 1605. Juliette, a former rope-dancer and acrobat, now pregnant and on the run from the law, takes refuge in the convent of Sainte Marie-de-la-Mer on the island of Noirmoutier. Taking the name of Soeur Auguste, Juliette prepares to raise her daughter Fleur under the protection of the kindly old Abbess. But the murder of King Henri IV in 1610 precipitates a period of political upheaval, and the old Abbess is replaced by the twelve-year-old daughter of an influential family, bent on reform. The new Abbess, Isabelle, duly arrives, accompanied by her confessor, the charismatic Père Colombin. But Colombin is not what he seems: Juliette immediately recognizes him as her former lover Guy LeMerle, known as the Blackbird, a former actor and confidence trickster, now posing as a priest for reasons of his own. LeMerle soon recognizes Juliette, and in order to ensure her silence, arranges to have the five-year-old Fleur removed from the abbey and sent to live with a local family.

With the encouragement of her confessor, the young Abbess begins to enforce her new regime, which includes strict discipline, the banning of old traditions and casting a beloved statue of the island's Saint into the sea. In this new atmosphere of suspicion and resentment, LeMerle convinces the community of nuns that Satan has taken over the convent, triggering mass hysteria, visions, and accusations of demonic possession.

Juliette attempts to find Fleur while battling her own feelings for LeMerle, and learns that his actions are not motivated by simple mischief or cruelty, but by his desire for revenge against the Bishop of Évreux, Isabelle's uncle. As the climate of hysteria grows, the church authorities - including the Bishop - arrive to investigate the Satanic happenings, and suspicion of witchcraft falls on Juliette. However, Juliette's skill as an acrobat enables her to come up with a scheme to fool the authorities. She stages a fake miracle as a diversion and escapes before rejoining Fleur and fleeing with her to the mainland. LeMerle is unmasked and sentenced to death, but Juliette frees him to return to his original role as a travelling entertainer. The new Abbess leaves the convent, which goes back to its previous, gentler regime, and Juliette and Fleur go on to travel with LeMerle as he tries to rebuild his company.

== Themes ==
The novel's themes include: society's treatment of misfits, and "the conflict between the nomadic life and the desire to be rooted," as well as the idea that "evil can entrance the human soul." The New Zealand Herald mentions as a principal theme the conflict between the "earthy female culture" of the Abbey and the "male religious principles of penance and sin."

== Reception ==
The novel was well-received, with reviewers making comparisons with Aldous Huxley's The Devils of Loudun, Scaramouche, and Ken Russell's The Devils. A starred review from Publishers Weekly notes its "spicy characterizations, tart dark humor and seductively pungent prose." The Times praises the author's evocation of a closed convent community, and Helen Falconer in The Guardian says: "Harris always pays careful attention to physical and social detail, and writing a "historical" novel has brought out the best in her descriptive style." Clare Colvin in The Independent writes: "Some of the best writing is about the sequin and cardboard glitter of make-believe," although she is critical of what she calls its "Ken Russell-style nuttiness", calling the novel an "archetypal fable" rather than a true representation of its era.
