= Blueeyedboy =

2010 novel by Joanne Harris

- Author: Joanne Harris
- Language: English
- Genre: psychological thriller
- Set in: Malbry, Yorkshire
- Publisher: Doubleday
- Publication date: 31st March, 2010
- Publication place: UK
- Media type: Print (hardback & paperback)
- Pages: 416 pp
- ISBN: 978-0385609500

Blueeyedboy is a psychological thriller novel by British author Joanne Harris. It was first published in 2010 by Doubleday.

B.B. Winter is a man in his forties, who works as a hospital porter and lives with his cruel and domineering mother, Gloria. Unable to escape her, he escapes instead into an online fantasy world of villainy and murder, in which he is admired by his dozen or so followers, and interacts most frequently with another user called Albertine, who knows him in real life and has secrets of her own.

== Background ==
Harris states that her initial inspiration for Blueeyedboy came from a conversation with a taxi driver in Naples. In an interview with The Irish Examiner she says:

He was telling me about his hard childhood and about his two brothers who were close to him in age. His mother had decided they would each wear a particular colour through their childhood, so if anyone lost their clothes she would know who it was. I thought, what would that do to somebody as they grew up? I noticed he was dressed all in his colour, blue. Yet he was in his 50s and his mother had been dead for 20 years.

Harris has spoken of writing Blueeyedboy after a split with her agent, causing a spell of writer's block. She found release in online communities, and became interested in the way people present themselves online.

In an interview for the Oxford Mail she says: "A little tantrum in real life seems so much bigger online. A capitalised word can be misconstrued, a smiley... becomes a mocking emoticon." She goes on to describe the relationships we make online as: "a... false intimacy,...based on information you've received, essentially on trust, in most cases from somebody who is a complete stranger."

In The Guardian Harris has also spoken of having a kind of synesthesia in which "colours have smells and tastes."

The title of Blueeyedboy echoes the quotation from Buffalo Bill by e.e. cummings, which appears at the beginning of the book:

and what i want to know is

how do you like your blueeyed boy

Mister Death

== Plot ==
The narrative, which takes the form of online journal entries, each with its accompanying mood and musical soundtrack, is split between two unreliable narrators: the eponymous Blueeyedboy, and Albertine, both of whom know each other in real life, and who share an uncomfortable history.

Blueeyedboy, or "B.B." is a man in his forties, the sole survivor of three brothers, each of whom has been allocated a colour of clothing by Gloria Winter, their domineering and abusive mother. A single parent, Gloria has had to be both frugal and harsh in rearing her sons. Nigel, the eldest, wears black; Brendan, the middle son, wears brown, and Benjamin, the favourite, wears blue.

B.B. wears blue, still lives with Gloria, in a terraced house in a poor neighbourhood of Malbry, the town which serves as the location for Gentlemen & Players and the rest of Harris' St Oswald's books. Gloria is volatile and controlling, and B.B. dreams of escaping her, but does so only in fantasy, on a fiction website called Badguysrock, where he posts violent stories in which older women are murdered in a variety of ways, and where he devises cruel ways to manipulate his dozen or so admiring (mostly women) followers. Like Albertine, he also uploads "restricted" posts to his web journal, which are more personal in tone, and which deal with his daily life and his relationship with his mother.

A porter in a local hospital, B.B. is still haunted by a series of events that occurred in his childhood, including the disappearance of a blind child prodigy called Emily White, who was under the tutelage of Dr Graham Peacock, a local teacher studying the effects of synesthesia. For a time B.B. was also part of this study, but was replaced by the more appealing Emily, who, though blind, had the ability to "see" music. Now the past is beginning to catch up with B.B. We see him stalking a girl in a red coat, with whom he is obsessed, and who may or may not be Albertine. As we learn the truth about the deaths of B.B.'s brothers, the murders he describes on his website begin to spill out into reality.

It is revealed that B.B. is not Benjamin, as his clothing might indicate, but the middle son, Brendan, who after the death of his brother, took his place in the household, and is secretly responsible for the deaths of both his siblings. His mother, who has been watching and interacting with him via his website Badguysrock under the pseudonym Jenny Tricks (Genitrix), and who herself may be responsible for the real-life deaths in the village, evades his attempt to murder her and returns home to take revenge.

== Themes ==
Colour plays a large part among the themes of this book, as do synaesthesia, "dysfunctional families and online living," as well as themes of "identity, and the difficulties of ever really knowing someone else." The book also deals with online communities and how individuals choose to interact and portray themselves there, as well as what constitutes the truth and "the nature of fiction."

In an interview with Harris for The Independent, Christian House writes:

Harris's fiction has consistently created worlds centred on "the idea of stealing a soul" or drawing up "a cloak of disguise". "I think all of my books have been in some way about this," she says. "About the questions 'Who am I?' and 'Where did I come from?' and 'Why do I do the things I do?' This is a very old idea, in so many ways. It's one of the main themes of literature, isn't it?"

Music also plays a large part in the novel, with web diary entries accompanied by a musical track and a "mood."

== Reception ==
Harris has described reader response to the book as "literary Marmite," as fans "seem to either love it or hate it." The book received largely positive reviews, however, with critics commenting on the beauty of the prose, the darkness of the subject matter and the intricacy of the plotting, although some also found it "disturbing and confusing."

Several publications commented on how different the novel is to the author's previous work, with The Times saying: "If your knowledge of Joanne Harris is limited to the picturesquely foodie Chocolat trilogy, then the dark, twisted heart of Blueeyedboy may come as a surprise."

The Oxford Mail says: "Blueeyedboy is unquestionably a masterpiece of deception and fantasy."The Independent praised the "seductive cadences" of the writing, and the Daily Express commented on the novel's complexity and "clever plotting." The Guardian calls it "a strange and experimental work," concluding: "Beautifully written, at times unfocused but always intriguing, this is a rewarding read, if not a particularly easy one."
