= Broken Light =

2023 novel by Joanne Harris

- Author: Joanne Harris
- Genre: Psychological thriller; Magical realism
- Publisher: Orion (UK)
- Publication date: May 11, 2023
- ISBN: 978-1-639-36472-5

Broken Light is a 2023 novel by British author Joanne Harris. It is a psychological thriller, with aspects of magical realism, and deals with a woman approaching menopause who develops paranormal abilities.

== Plot ==
The book is written in a multiple-narrative technique, alternating first-person accounts between Bernie Moon and her old school friend Katie Hemsworth.

Bernie Moon is nearing fifty, lonely and menopausal. She lives in London with her husband Martin, has one son whom she seldom sees, works in a local bookshop and has virtually no friends. But the murder of a woman in a nearby park re-awakens a latent talent, and she begins to experience "flashes" that allow her to enter - and in some cases, influence - the minds of others.

She first uses this talent to identify a predator, Jim "Woody" Wood, a friend of Martin's, who she thinks may be the murderer of the woman in the park. She realizes that he is not, but that he does mean to spike the drink of a young woman, Iris, who works in a local coffee shop. Bernie follows Iris and Woody to their date, and intervenes psychically to protect Iris, with the result that Woody passes out, and continues to do so every time he thinks about harming a woman. Iris and Bernie become friends. When she finds out about Bernie's "superpower", Iris is eager for Bernie to use it again.

As Bernie starts to understand her powers, we find that she developed them as a child, and has suppressed them, following an early incident involving a boy called Adam Price, and a later one, in which a predatory schoolteacher took his own life. We also learn that Bernie shared her ability with a friend, Katie, from whom she is now estranged. Katie still lives in Bernie's home town, and has an apparently perfect life, which Bernie envies. We also learn that Martin, whom Bernie met while they were at school, nurses a secret infatuation for Katie. Bernie and Martin married when Bernie fell pregnant at eighteen, and Bernie sacrificed her chance of going to university to look after their son. Now, as their 30-year high school reunion party approaches, she realizes that she has spent her life looking after other people.

Encouraged by Iris, and motivated by the approach of the high school reunion, Bernie sets out to change. She uses her powers benignly to help the bookshop sell more books, and enjoys vicarious experiences by observing the habits of others. She joins a running club and discovers the comradeship of other women. Meanwhile, Woody is still suffering unexplained episodes of narcolepsy. Martin invites him to stay for a few days, and he moves in, to Bernie's dismay. Weeks pass, and Woody, increasingly dysfunctional, becomes convinced that he was drugged as part of a nefarious plan by women to emasculate and enslave men. His social media accounts and podcast are filled with these conspiracy theories, which begin to gain a following, especially among young men.

Woody makes his dislike of Bernie clear, although he has no memory of her intervention. Bernie wants to make him leave, but is afraid of doing further damage. Finally, emboldened by her friendship with Iris, she finds the courage to tell him to go without using her superpowers, and he moves out, though he remains convinced that she is connected to the conspiracy. Meanwhile, Martin is making plans for the 30-year high school reunion, during which he intends to reform his high school band, and recreate the set they played at the original graduation party, when he first became attracted to Katie.

As the date of the reunion party approaches, Bernie, encouraged by Iris, begins to enjoy her powers. She runs a 5k with her running group, gets singing lessons, gets a tattoo and becomes reunited with her son. But when Iris steals a designer dress for her during a shopping expedition, she begins to suspect that Iris's personality change is a result of her own intervention. Her suspicions are confirmed when a client of Martin's, an author known for his misogynistic behaviour, begins to behave erratically following a visit to their home, and when Woody, whose own behaviour has become increasingly strange, is killed in a stabbing incident in a women-only gym.

Convinced now that her powers are both toxic and somehow infectious, Bernie tries to concentrate on the reunion party, which she hopes will bring her closer to Martin. She lets him travel to their home town of Malbry without her, meaning to surprise him later with her transformation. She disconnects from Iris, breaking the psychic link between them, and travels to Malbry, where she appears at the party and performs the song she has been practicing. On stage, she enters Katie's mind and understands why her friend abandoned her. She too is a victim of date rape, this time by Martin when they were both at university, and Katie has internalized the guilt, believing herself to be at fault.

But Adam Price, the boy on whom their first psychic experiment was directed, has never forgotten the incident. Obsessed with Woody's podcast and his conspiracy theories, he is certain that Bernie and Katie are responsible for the failures in his life. He attempts to stab Katie onstage, but Bernie intervenes, and sacrifices herself in the attempt, having realized that Adam is a victim, and not a predator.

== Themes ==
The backdrop of lockdown, the #MeToo campaign and the murder of Sarah Everard during the COVID-19 pandemic has been cited as the context for Harris' writing of Broken Light. The novel also deals with the theme of women in menopause and the invisibility of the older woman. In an interview with Dr Louise Newson, Harris speaks about Bernie's superpowers as "a metaphor for the anger of women in later life who are too often silenced in art and reality". It also deals with the impact of social media, gender politics, friendship and self-discovery.

== Carrie ==
In a guest post for the Nerd Daily, Harris acknowledges the debt of Broken Light to Stephen King's Carrie, saying:

...menopause triggers Bernie's powers just as puberty triggers Carrie's: both are a metaphor for rage, though Carrie's rage is reactive, directed against the bullies at school, her mother and ultimately herself, whilst Bernie's rage, though quieter, is both feminist and political; the rage of a woman forced to endure forty years of gaslighting from a patriarchy that insists that women's experience doesn't count; that we are somehow in a minority.

In an interview with The Guardian, Harris says she began the book after re-reading Carrie during lockdown, and during her cancer treatment, which she says was "like menopause, but worse".

== Reception ==
Publishers Weekly called Broken Light "an intricate, brilliantly plotted thriller". The Telegraph said that the book "landed polemical blows", but dismissed the concept as "cartoonish". Author Ian Rankin named Broken Light as one of his best books of the year in the New Statesman, saying, "This is Angela Carter meets Carrie and it is done with dizzying aplomb. Bernie Moon is a compelling and complex creation."

The audiobook of the novel, narrated by Imogen Stubbs, was selected as one of the Best Summer Audiobooks of 2023 by the Financial Times.
