= Grimm & Co. (writing organisation) =

Grimm & Co is a non-profit creative writing organisation based in Rotherham, South Yorkshire. It was founded in 2016, and focuses on encouraging literacy skills and confidence in young people aged 7–18, with a focus on those who are disadvantaged.

== Overview ==
Grimm & Co was founded by Deborah Bullivant. In 2009 Bullivant was asked by Rotherham Council to lead a study into the effect of creative literacy approaches on Year 6 SATs results, due to low results in the borough. Funded by the Regional Development Agency, she led a study alongside the University of Sheffield, and discovered that the most effective way to improve literacy skills was one-on-one mentoring and the use of creative stimuli. The 'Inspire Rotherham' model was trialled across all primary schools in Rotherham, and results in English Reading and Writing Key Stage 2 attainment levels improved within the year. After the trial had ended, Bullivant looked to continue creative approaches to building literacy skills. Inspired by other creative writing charities such as the Ministry of Stories and the TED Talk 'Once Upon a School' led by American author Dave Eggers, founder of 826 Valencia, she secured funding from Arts Council England to create a partner organisation for Yorkshire with the theme of an apothecary for magical beings. To achieve this vision she partnered with Sheffield-based design company Side By Side and a team of volunteers to renovate a disused pub in Rotherham town centre. Grimm & Co's Apothecary opened on 29 February 2016.

Grimm & Co has recently received further funding from the Arts Council and purchased Grade II-listed Talbot Lane Methodist Church located opposite Rotherham Town Hall. Grimm & Co plans to move its writing centre to the new premises in 2021.

Since opening, Grimm and Co has offered workshops to 10,837 children and young people from across the north of England. Grimm and Co is supported by over 150 volunteers and has a number of patrons including Joanne Harris, Ian McMillan, Paul Clayton, Sir Paul Collier, Abi Elphinstone, Mark Gatiss and Chris Mould.

In 2019 Grimm & Co received funding from the education charity SHINE, through their Bridging the Gap fund. Working with the design company Side by Side, Grimm & Co built a portable Grimm & Co experience which was taken into seven different schools in South Yorkshire

In May 2020, working with patron Paul Clayton, Grimm & Co hosted a showcase of young people's writing called ‘Here Not There’ where young people's stories were read by a number of notable actors and writers including Gary Oldman, Olivia Colman, Mark Gatiss, David Mitchell, Indira Varma, Jeremy Dyson, Joanne Harris and Lucy Benjamin.

== Programmes ==
=== Workshops ===
Grimm & Co run workshops, out of school clubs and school visits to pupils across Yorkshire. Grimm & Co’s aim in the programmes is to develop confidence and creativity around writing. Their motto is ‘changing lives one story at a time’.

== Apothecary ==
Grimm & Co operates an apothecary, a gift shop open to the general public. The apothecary is the entrance to the charity's workshops. Proceeds from sales in the apothecary help to fund the charity's workshops and clubs.
