= Runelight =

2011 children's novel by Joanne Harris

- First edition cover
- Author: Joanne Harris
- Language: English
- Genre: fantasy novel
- Publisher: Doubleday
- Publication place: United Kingdom
- Preceded by: Runemarks
- Followed by: The Gospel of Loki

Runelight is a 2011 fantasy novel by Joanne Harris and is the second in her RUNE series, following her previous novel, Runemarks. The book centers on Maddy Smith, and her twin sister, Maggie Rede, both on opposing sides of a war between the new gods and the old, who must both face powerful forces in order to save everything they hold dear. Harris began working on the sequel due to feeling "that it wasn't finished as a story, that there was one chapter in the story that might continue".

== Description ==
Three years after the events in Runemarks, the Middle World has changed again. After the destruction of the Order, the surviving gods, having rescued their friends from the Black Fortress of Netherworld, have regrouped in the village of Malbry. The General is dead and chances of rebuilding Asgard seem remote. But a prophecy, coupled with the appearance of unnatural creatures in the Middle Worlds, reveal a breach in Chaos, which may lead to another Apocalypse. Once more, Maddy and her friends are forced to confront an enemy. This time, the enemy is one of their own, a renegade from World's End - Maddy's twin sister. They are both the daughters of Thor.

== Reception ==
Tanja Jennings of School Librarian magazine said Runelight had "a Tolkienesque structure of maps and ancient runes". Peter Burton of the Daily Express said it has a "lack of plot and thin character development", and was a "distinct disappointment". The journalist Valentine of The Guardian praised it, saying it is "rich with mythology and description" and they were "enraptured by this wonderful book". Angela Youngman of the Monsters and Critics online magazine wrote that while the book was "not an easy read ... it is worth persevering".
