= Five Quarters of the Orange =

2001 novel by Joanne Harris

- First edition cover
- Author: Joanne Harris
- Cover artist: Stuart Haygarth
- Language: English
- Genre: Historical fiction
- Publisher: Doubleday
- Publication date: 2001
- Publication place: United Kingdom
- Media type: Print (Hardback & Paperback)
- Pages: 307 pp
- ISBN: 0-552-99883-4
- OCLC: 48026119
- Preceded by: Blackberry Wine

Five Quarters of the Orange is a novel written by English author Joanne Harris and first published by Doubleday in 2001. It also exists as an audiobook, narrated by the author.

The novel is set in France, in the small village of Les Laveuses on the river Loire. With two alternating timelines throughout the story, Five Quarters of the Orange may be described as historical fiction. One narrative strand follows Framboise Dartigen's childhood during the German Occupation. Framboise remembers her difficult relationship with her mother and two siblings as well as her dangerous friendship with a young German officer. The other part of the story is set in present-day France, now following the life of the widowed Framboise Simon, who returns under an alias to the village of her childhood. Framboise opens a small restaurant, cooking the recipes left to her by her mother, but conceals her identity, lest she be recognized as the daughter of the woman who once brought shame and tragedy upon the village.

== Themes ==
As with her other works, Blackberry Wine and Chocolat, Joanne Harris places strong emphasis on the symbolic and emotional importance of food and cooking throughout the novel. For Framboise's mother, cooking is a means of expressing her love for her children, whereas others use food as a weapon, for bartering and blackmail. Food also serves its purpose as a gateway to the past and is a significant key to tying the two time lines together. Other themes have been identified as: "misfortune, mystery and intense family relations."

== Background ==
Harris has stated in interview that the novel was inspired by the stories her French grandfather told her when she was a child. He had fought in the war, and been decorated. During the Occupation he and his family had been denounced to the Gestapo and forced to go into hiding on a relative's farm. This story, among others, provided the inspiration for Mirabelle's farm in Five Quarters of the Orange.

== Plot ==
The story is narrated in the first person over two time sequences by Framboise Dartigen, the youngest child of Mirabelle Dartigen, a woman still remembered and hated for an incident that happened when Framboise was nine, in the tiny French village of Les Laveuses, during the Second World War.

Framboise has been profoundly marked by this incident and the events leading up to it. Now a widow of twenty years, she returns to the village on the Loire to restore the family's burnt-out farm. She uses her married name, Francoise Simon, as she does not want the villagers to know her real identity. She opens a small restaurant, cooking her mother's recipes. Business is successful; a notable food critic brings it to prominence in a national magazine. This results in a visit from her nephew, Yannick, and his wife, Laure, who are eager to profit from Framboise's sudden popularity. Their arrival threatens the new life Framboise has built for herself.

Framboise, her brother Cassis and her sister Reine-Claude lost their father early. Their mother, Mirabelle Dartigen, was a difficult woman, prone to crippling migraines and more tender with her fruit trees than with her own children. Faced with having to bring up three children and run a farm alone, Mirabelle had to be very tough; sadly, this toughness translated into a lack of outward affection towards her children. When the war came and the Germans occupied Les Laveuses, Mirabelle had to be tougher than ever; the children, with no-one to supervise them, ran wild, eventually falling under the spell of a young German soldier, Tomas, who first bribed them with black-market goods like oranges or chocolate, then manipulated them into secretly giving him information about their friends and neighbours. Framboise, the youngest child, whose relationship with her mother was especially tortuous, became closest to Tomas, and now blames herself for the series of events that resulted in Tomas's death, the retribution killing of ten villagers by the Gestapo and Mirabelle's flight from the family home.

Now, 56 years later, Framboise relives these traumatic events and tries to understand how they have shaped her life and relationships. Eventually, as the truth emerges, she learns how to face down the bullies who threaten her, as well as to forgive herself and her mother, to give herself permission to love, to reconnect with her two estranged daughters and to finally put the past to rest.

== Characters ==
=== Framboise Dartigen ===
The youngest of three, she is most like her mother in spirit. She is defiant, secretive, independent, and tough, often taking the lead with her siblings. She has the maturity and the ruthlessness of a much older child and is used to acting on her own. She is not above lying, stealing or otherwise breaking the rules to get what she wants, and shows as little affection towards her mother as her mother shows to her. She is, however, more sensitive than she would first appear. She barely remembers her father, but misses his influence terribly. This is what initially draws her to the young Tomas Leibniz, who becomes a father-substitute, best friend and elder brother-figure all in one.

The older Framboise has matured into another version of her mother. Repeating the pattern of Mirabelle's behaviour, she finds it hard to express affection for her two daughters, or to rely on anyone. She is prickly, cynical and tough, the toughness hiding the scars of her past, which she still feels keenly.

=== Tomas Leibniz ===
The young German officer who becomes friends with the children. He first spots Framboise in the market in Les Laveuses stealing an orange, but doesn't call her on it. Later he's intrigued by her character, and the kids trade information about the people in the village with him for trinkets and magazines. He is an ambivalent character, pursuing his own interests, indifferent to Nazi ideology, unafraid of the negative consequences of his actions. He is a skilled manipulator of people and is not averse to using children to achieve his ends, but he is also kind to Framboise and understands her better than anyone else.

=== Paul Hourias ===
Initially a childhood friend of the Dartigen siblings, he drifted away as he remained "on the outside" of their game. He resurfaces when Framboise returns to town, decades later, and helps her to deal and cope with Laure and Yannick's campaign to make her sell them her mother's story. He had been in love with her sister, but now loves her, as he finally confesses at the end of the story.

=== Mirabelle Dartigen ===
Framboise, Cassis and Reine's mother. A complicated woman, more at home in the garden or the kitchen than the nursery. She has had to be strong to survive, but her children do not understand how much she genuinely cares for them. She believes in treating children like fruit trees - they benefit from harsh pruning - and so gives them no sign of affection. Instead she expresses her love through cooking - although the children do not understand this. Mirabelle is generally not liked in the village, partly because she does not attend church and partly because for a woman running a farm alone was thought at that time to be slightly indecent. She suffers from terrible headaches, often heralded by the phantom scent of oranges, which cause her to be out of action for days at a time. She keeps a diary among her recipes, written in a secret code.

=== Cassis Dartigen ===
The oldest of the children, he misses his father the most, and wants to be the man of the household. But Framboise is the stronger character, and soon takes over leadership of the siblings.

=== Reine-Claude Dartigen ===
The middle child, she is the opposite of Framboise. She is very pretty, feminine and biddable, and Mirabelle favours her over Framboise because Framboise reminds her too much of herself.

=== Yannick Dessanges ===
Cassis's son. A weak and feckless man, in thrall to his forceful wife, Laure.

=== Laure Dessanges ===
Yannick's wife. A ruthless, greedy woman, out to exploit Framboise's reputation and hoping to inherit her money.

== Reception ==
The book was shortlisted for the 2002 WH Smith Literary Award for fiction, and was longlisted for the Orange Prize. Critical reception was divided: The Guardian criticized elements of the plotting and pacing, saying: "The story has (just) enough action to avoid tedium and induce some sort of tension, but the pace is jog rather than sprint and the relief at getting to the end is that of arrival, not understanding," whereas Publishers Weekly praises the "multilayered plot" and says of the novel: "This intense work brims with sensuality and sensitivity." The New York Times says: "Harris takes her time to get to the point... but the ending is unexpectedly sweet and powerful, a reward for the patient reader."
