= David Miller (editor) =

British writer and journalist

- Occupation: Journalist/Author

David Miller is a British writer and journalist based in Wimbledon, London.

== Journalism ==
David Miller has contributed to many publications including the magazines Film Review, TV Zone and Starburst (where his work includes interviews with Sir Ian McKellen, Tom Baker and Ray Harryhausen).

Until 2007 he was editor of the UK-based horror genre magazine Shivers. He then became editor for the last few issues of The Poirot Collection, a partwork which presented the Agatha Christie's Poirot television episodes. He is editor of The Agatha Christie Collection partwork for Chorion, which brings together and presents the newer episodes of Poirot and Marple; the 1983 series Partners in Crime, and Agatha Christie film adaptations such as the Margaret Rutherford Miss Marple films and the all-star adaptations of The Mirror Crack'd, and Murder On The Orient Express.

== Books ==
Miller co-wrote the book They Came From Outer Space! with Mark Gatiss (of The League of Gentlemen), and is author of The Complete Peter Cushing; an overview of the life and works of the actor Peter Cushing. This was originally published as The Peter Cushing Companion in 2000, and re-released as Peter Cushing: A Life in Film (Titan Books, 2013).

== Bibliography ==
- The Complete Peter Cushing (original title: The Peter Cushing Companion) (ISBN 978-1903111031)
- They Came From Outer Space!: Alien Encounters In The Movies (with Mark Gatiss) (ISBN 978-1901018004)
