= Runemarks =

2007 novel by Joanne Harris

- First edition cover
- Author: Joanne Harris
- Cover artist: David White
- Language: English
- Genre: fantasy novel
- Publisher: Doubleday
- Publication date: 2 August 2007
- Publication place: United Kingdom
- Pages: 500 pp
- ISBN: 978-0-385-61130-5
- OCLC: 124958523
- Followed by: Runelight

Runemarks is a 2007 fantasy novel by Joanne Harris. The book was published on 2 August 2007 by Doubleday Publishing and is set in a world where the Norse gods still survive as outlaws, their powers diminished, while a new and more powerful religion, the Order, tries to wipe out magic from the world. Harris has stated that she was inspired to write the book due to her love of Norse mythology as a child, with the book being loosely based on a novel she wrote in her late teens.

The book was followed up with a 2011 sequel entitled Runelight.

== Description ==
Runemarks follows Maddy, a young loner who has been ostracised from her town for the rust-coloured rune mark she carries on her left hand. Animals born with a rune mark on their bodies are seen as cursed or deformed and are usually quickly slaughtered. Maddy is allowed to live because she is human, but is always viewed with suspicion despite this. Her village does not follow the Norse Gods, as the puritanical regime known as the Order has mandated that no one is to speak or acknowledge any of the old ways, let alone use magic. It is only after she helps rid the local inn's cellar of goblins that Maddy discovers her latent magic, with it quickly becoming something that is occasionally useful to herself and those around her. As the book progresses Maddy flashes back to her childhood where she learned about runes and Norse legends through the old traveller One-Eye, who later reveals himself to Maddy as Odin and involves her in a quest to find a treasure buried beneath Red Horse Hill. As they search, they come across several other Norse gods and are led into a confrontation with the Order and their leader.

== Characters ==
- Maddy Smith: A troubled, defiant, lonely child who will not go to church and is described by others as "imaginative", which is thought almost as bad as "giving herself airs". Her father does not love her, believing her birth to have caused her mother's death. She is considered ugly, made worse by the fact that her sister is both popular and very pretty. She has no friends and seeks refuge in stories and things of the imagination, all of which are viewed as dangerous by the society in which she lives.
- Odin/One-Eye/the General: A traveller who educates Maddy in the use of the runes, and eventually turns out to be the leader of the gods in disguise. He is wily, sometimes unscrupulous, occasionally manipulative. He befriends Maddy and helps her, but also plans to use her for his own ends. Weakened after the End of the Worlds, he has lost most of his powers, but still has ambitions to rebuild his empire.
- Loki, the Trickster: Half-demon, half-god, escaped by devious means from the Fortress of Netherworld. Charming, dishonest and unscrupulous; a villain who ends up being a very reluctant hero.
- Skadi: Huntress and goddess of hunting. Hates Loki.
- Freyja: Goddess of Desire. Vain and shallow. Hates Loki.
- Heimdall: watchman of the gods. Hates Loki most of all.
- Sugar-and-Sack: A goblin and a reluctant hero, enlisted by Maddy.
- Adam Scattergood: a boy in Maddy's village. A bully, the son of the local innkeeper and Maddy's principal tormentor.

== Reception ==
Critical reception for Runemarks has been mostly positive. Publishers Weekly gave it a starred review, saying: "Playing fast and loose with Norse mythology, (Harris) creates a glorious and complex world replete with rune-based magical spells, bickering gods, exciting adventures and difficult moral issues." The Guardian praised the novel, stating it "has a narrative nonchalance which just about evens out its ponderous infrastructure." The SF Gate wrote that Runemarks "comes up short in terms of thematic rigor and depth of imagination" but that it also "delivers an adventure that will please a wide array of readers".
