= Bestseller Awards =

British book awards

The Bestseller Awards, previously the Nielsen Bestseller Awards and the Whitaker Awards, are given annually for books sold in the United Kingdom on the basis of their total number of sales, both in print and as e-books, as measured by BookScan. In 2024 the awards are hosted by Nielsen BookData and BolognaBookPlus.

A book may be given an award if it sells 250,000 (silver), 500,000 (gold) or 1,000,000 copies (platinum). Initially this had to be within a period of five years, but in 2017 this was extended to the period for which BookScan sales records were held: 1998 for print books and 2014 for e-books.

The awards were established in 2001 as the Whitaker Awards: Nielsen BookData traces its origins to the foundation of the trade magazine The Bookseller in 1858 by Joseph Whitaker, the creator of Whitaker's Almanack. They were later known as the Nielsen Book Gold and Platinum Awards, and relaunched in 2017 as the Nielsen Bestseller Awards, with the addition of a silver award and the inclusion of e-books as well as print sales.

It has been announced that the 2024 awards will be announced on 22 January 2024 in London, hosted by Neilsen BookData (owned by NielsenIQ) and BolognaBookPlus. A press-release described this as "the first in-person Bestseller Awards in three years, the last two having been held virtually or as individual presentations", and the official website of the awards, as of January 2024, lists the 2021 virtual ceremony as the most recent. The 2021 awards were announced in March 2021.
