= George Washington University =

Private university in Washington, D.C., US

- Former names: Columbian College (1821–1873); Columbian University (1873–1904)
- Motto: Latin: Deus Nobis Fiducia
- Motto in English: "God is Our Trust"
- Type: Private federally chartered research university
- Established: February 9, 1821; 205 years ago
- Accreditation: MSCHE
- Academic affiliations: AAU; CUWMA; NAICU; ORAU
- Endowment: $3.6 billion (2026)
- President: Ellen Granberg
- Provost: Edward J. Balleisen
- Students: 24,500 (2025)
- Undergraduates: 11,148 (2025)
- Postgraduates: 12,936 (2025)
- Location: Washington, D.C., U.S.
- Campus: 43 acres (17 ha); Large city
- Newspaper: The GW Hatchet
- Colors: Buff and blue
- Nickname: Revolutionaries
- Sporting affiliations: NCAA Division I – A-10; CWPA; EARC; EAWRC
- Mascot: George
- Website: gwu.edu

The George Washington University (GW or GWU) is a private federally chartered research university in Washington, D.C., United States. Chartered in 1821 by the United States Congress as the Columbian College, it is the first university founded under Washington, D.C.'s jurisdiction and one of six federally chartered universities in the United States.

GW is classified among "R1: Doctoral Universities – Very High Research Activity". It is a member of the Association of American Universities. The university offers degree programs in seventy-one disciplines, enrolling around 11,500 undergraduate and 15,000 graduate students. The school's athletic teams, the George Washington Revolutionaries, play in the NCAA Division I Atlantic 10 Conference. GW also annually hosts numerous political events, including the World Bank and International Monetary Fund's Annual Meetings.

Several notable individuals have served as trustees, including two presidents, John Quincy Adams and Ulysses S. Grant, as well as Alexander Graham Bell. GW has over 1,100 active alumni in the U.S. Foreign Service and is one of the largest feeder schools for the diplomatic corps. In the 2023–2024 academic year, GW had $227 million in externally funded research.

== History ==
=== Founding ===
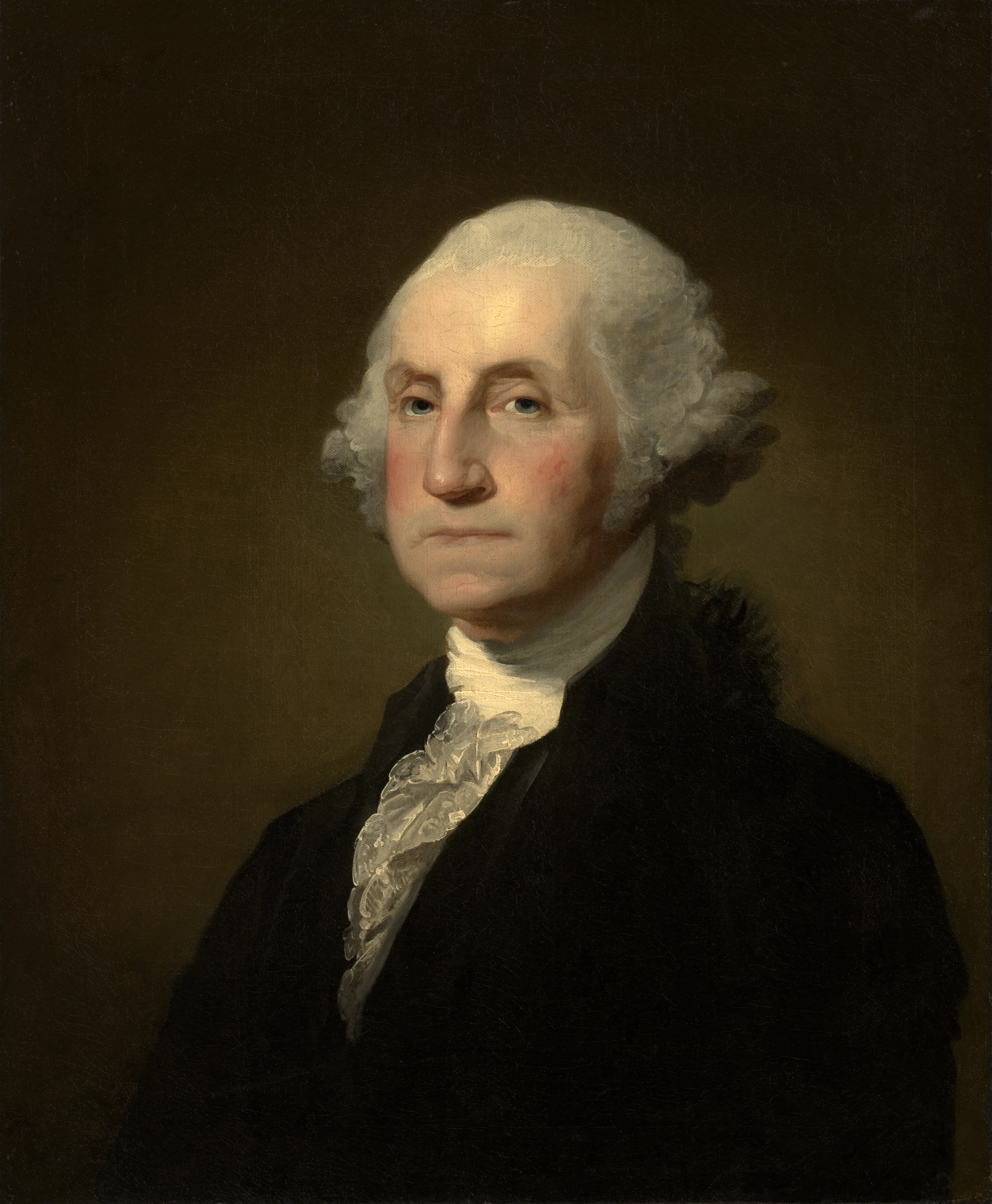
In July 1799, in his last will and testament, President George Washington left shares to endow a university in the nation's new capital.

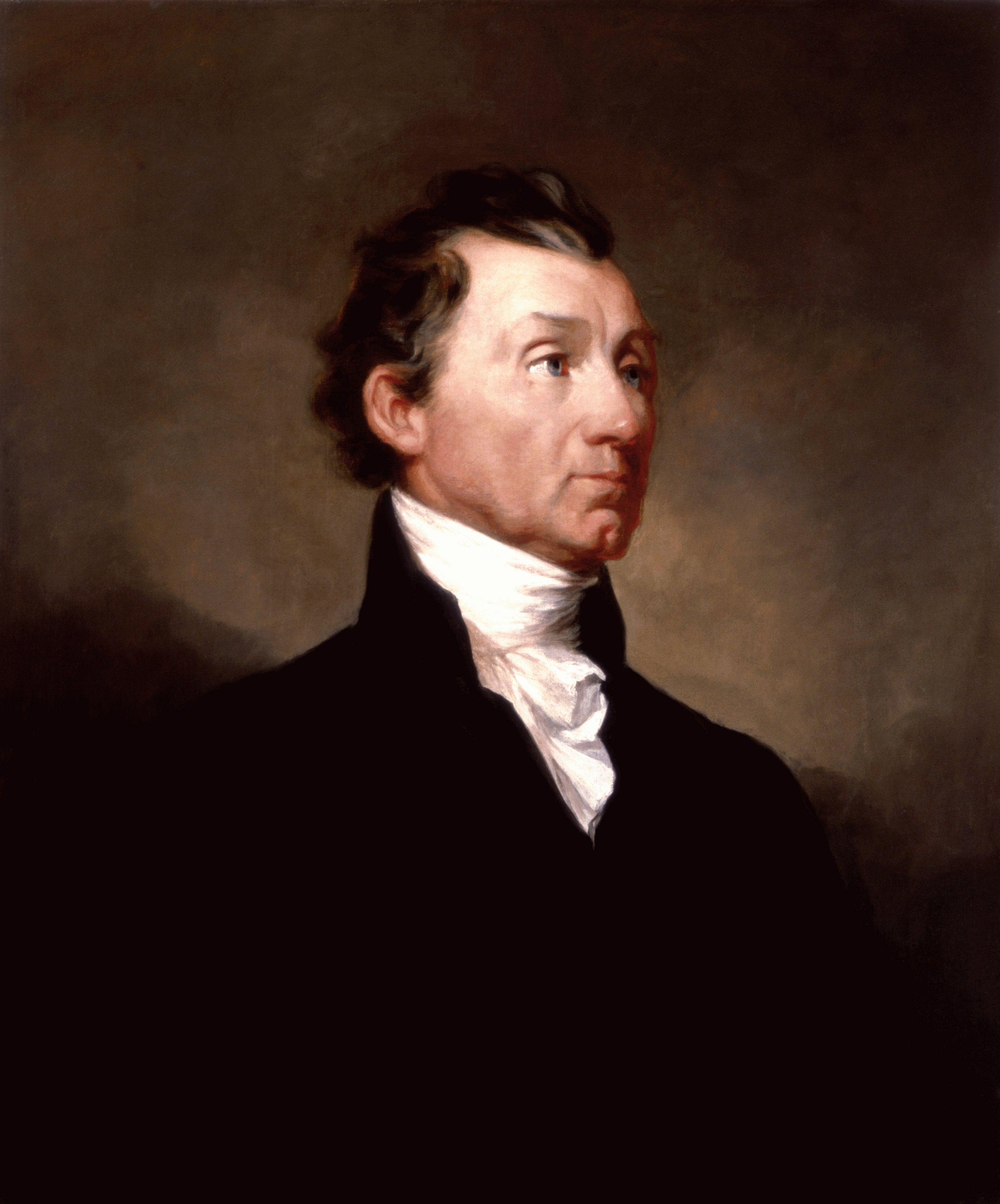
President James Monroe, one of the university's founding benefactors, approved the university's Congressional Charter. Monroe's house is located on the university's Foggy Bottom campus.

The first president of the United States, George Washington, long favored the establishment of a university in a central part of the United States. He advocated for its establishment to the U.S. Congress and others throughout his political career. Washington envisioned the new university would be in a central part of the new national capital, and he hoped the university would educate the most promising students from across the country while reaping the benefits of its location in Washington, D.C.

On December 14, 1799, George Washington died at his home in Mount Vernon. Washington included a bequest of his shares in the Potomac Company to establish the university in his last will and testament, though the shares lost their value and no educational institution ever benefited from them. Following his death, his desire was shared and encouraged by U.S. presidents Thomas Jefferson and James Madison, who both expressed the need to carry out Washington's plans.

In 1821, the Baptist missionary and leading minister Luther Rice secured funds from James Monroe, John Quincy Adams, John C. Calhoun, and other benefactors for a college to educate citizens from throughout the young nation in Washington, D.C. A large building was constructed on College Hill, which is now known as Meridian Hill. On February 9, 1821, President Monroe approved the congressional charter, creating the non-denominational Columbian College. Washingtonians, Congress, and the academic community celebrated this new institution as the fulfillment of Washington's vision. In 1824, the first commencement was considered an important event for the young city. In attendance were President Monroe, John C. Calhoun, Henry Clay, the Marquis de Lafayette, and other dignitaries.

=== 19th century ===
During the 19th century, most of the university's students came from the South. As the American Civil War commenced in 1861, many left their studies to join the Confederate States Army. Professor of anatomy A. Y. P. Garnett left the university to serve as Jefferson Davis' physician, and Robert King Stone stayed in Washington, D.C., serving as physician to Abraham Lincoln. The college was temporarily turned into a Union Army military camp during the Civil War. Poet Walt Whitman worked at this camp while visiting his wounded brother. In 1873, following the Civil War, Columbian College was renamed Columbian University and moved to an urban downtown location centered on 15th and H streets.

=== 20th century ===
In 1904, Columbian University was renamed George Washington University following an agreement with the George Washington Memorial Association. In honor of George Washington, funds from the memorial association were donated to construct Lisner Auditorium.

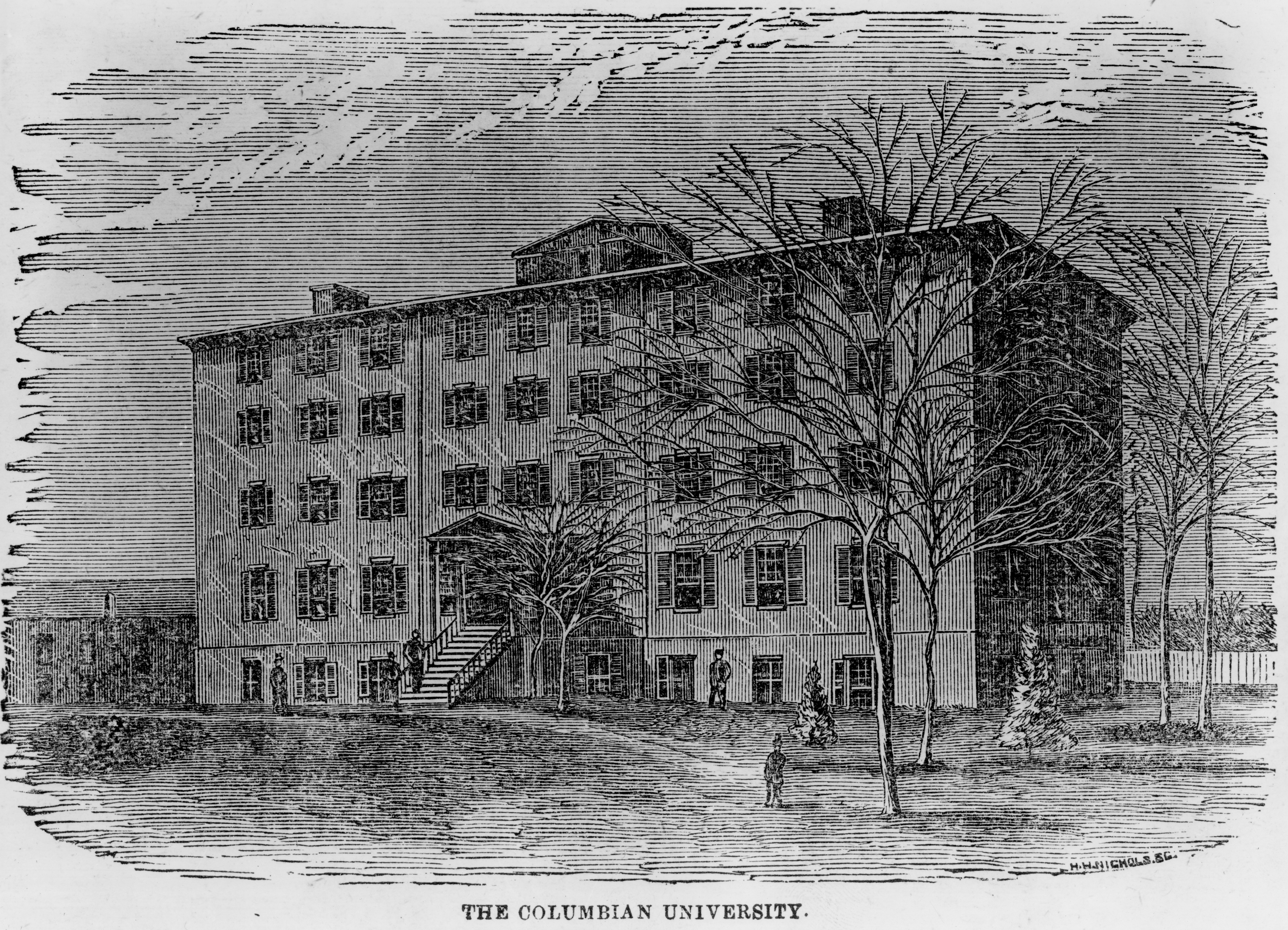
An engraving of the university's first building on Meridian Hill, c. 1821

In 1912, the university moved its principal operations to the Foggy Bottom neighborhood of Washington, D.C. Many of the colleges of the George Washington University are notable for their age and history. The law school is the oldest law school in the District of Columbia. The medical school is the 11th-oldest medical school in the nation and the first established in the nation's capital. The Columbian College was founded in 1821 and is the oldest unit of the university. The Elliott School of International Affairs was formalized in 1898.

In the 1930s, the university was a major center for theoretical physics. George Gamow, a cosmologist, developed the Big Bang theory at the university in the 1930s and 1940s. On January 26, 1939, Niels Bohr announced that Otto Hahn had successfully split the atom at the Fifth Washington Conference on theoretical physics in the Hall of Government.

During the Vietnam War era, Thurston Hall, an undergraduate dormitory housing 1,116 students at 1900 F Street NW, located three blocks from the White House, was a staging ground for student anti-war demonstrations. In 1996, the university purchased the Mount Vernon College for Women in the city's Palisades neighborhood that became the school's coeducational Mount Vernon Campus. The campus was first utilized in 1997 for women only but became co-educational in a matter of years. The Mount Vernon campus is now totally integrated into the GW community, serving as a complement to the Foggy Bottom campus. In 1999, GW hosted the Town Hall with President Clinton, the first presidential town hall to ever be webcast live.

=== 21st century ===
In December 2006, the university appointed Johns Hopkins University provost Steven Knapp as the 16th President of the George Washington University, and his presidency began August 1, 2007. In 2017, Thomas LeBlanc, provost of the University of Miami, was named the President of the George Washington University. In 2016 the University closed the food court named J Street at its Foggy Bottom campus. In 2023 a new dining hall, inside Shenkman Hall, opened. During the period in between, on-campus food options were limited.

In July 2020, the university began forming special committees to look at possible name changes to an on-campus building and the school moniker. In a statement on the university's website, LeBlanc said one of the panels would examine the Colonials moniker, which critics said conjured up racism, violence, and genocide. In 2022, the Colonials name was officially retired. The following year, in 2023, the new nickname, the George Washington Revolutionaries, was announced. Another panel looked into renaming the Marvin Center, which was named after former school President Cloyd Heck Marvin, a segregationist.

In January 2022, LeBlanc was succeeded by former Washington University in St. Louis Chancellor Mark S. Wrighton as interim university president. A year later, in January 2023, the university named Ellen Granberg, provost at Rochester Institute of Technology, as the university's new president, with a start date of July 1, 2023. George Washington University joined the Association of American Universities in 2023.

In February 2025, Leo Terrell, the head of the Trump administration's Task Force to Combat Antisemitism, announced that he would investigate George Washington University as part of the U.S. Department of Justice's broader investigation into antisemitism on college campuses. In December 2025, the Russian government designated the university as an "undesirable organization" on charges of promoting anti-Russian sentiment and false claims about the Russian invasion of Ukraine. In April 2026, GW announced that tuition would be free for families making less than $100,000 and half for families making $150,000, marking the most generous financial aid program in the District of Columbia. The university also announced a large expansion of merit aid.

== Campuses ==
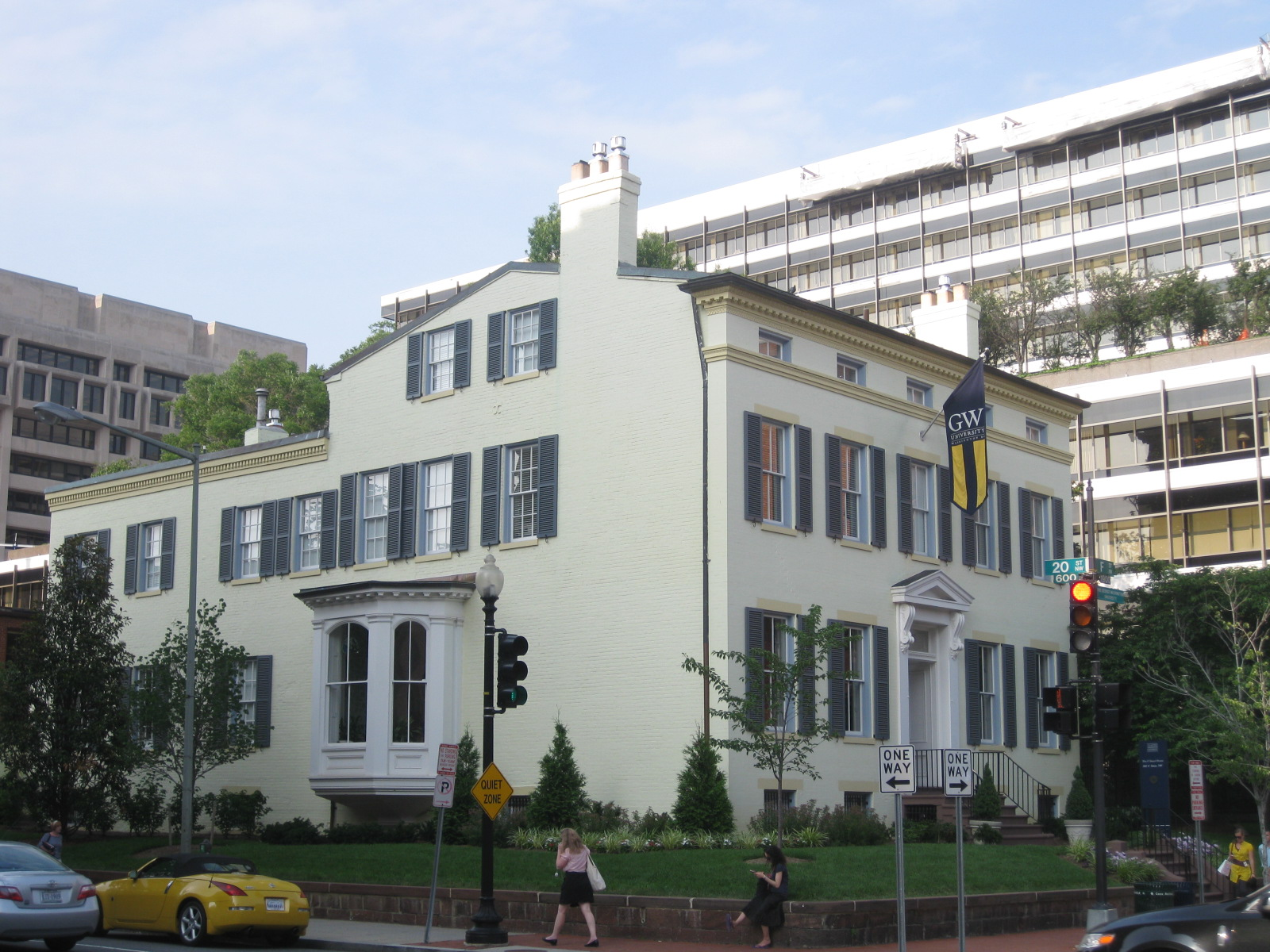
F Street House, the residence of George Washington University's president with the global headquarters of the International Monetary Fund visible in the background

GW has three fully integrated campuses in the Washington, D.C. area: the Foggy Bottom campus, the Mount Vernon campus, and the Virginia Science and Technology campus. The Foggy Bottom Campus houses the vast majority of academic programming. Residence halls exist on the Foggy Bottom and Mount Vernon campuses.

The GW library system contains the Gelman Library, the Himmelfarb Health Sciences Library, the Burns Law Library, Eckles Library, and the Virginia Science and Technology Library. The GW Library System is a constituent member of the Washington Research Library Consortium, which allows for resource sharing among the university libraries of the Washington metropolitan area.

=== Foggy Bottom ===
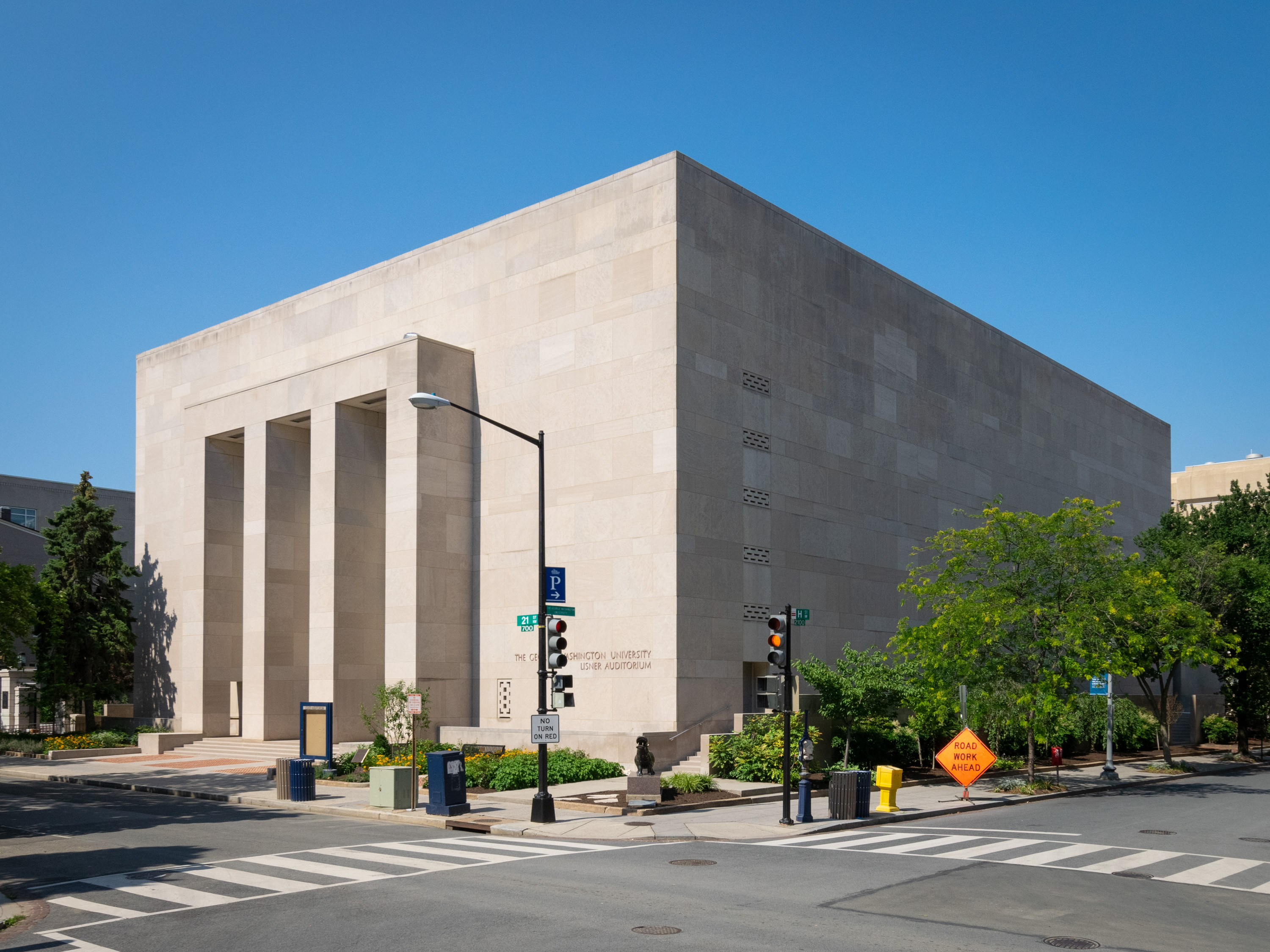
Lisner Auditorium

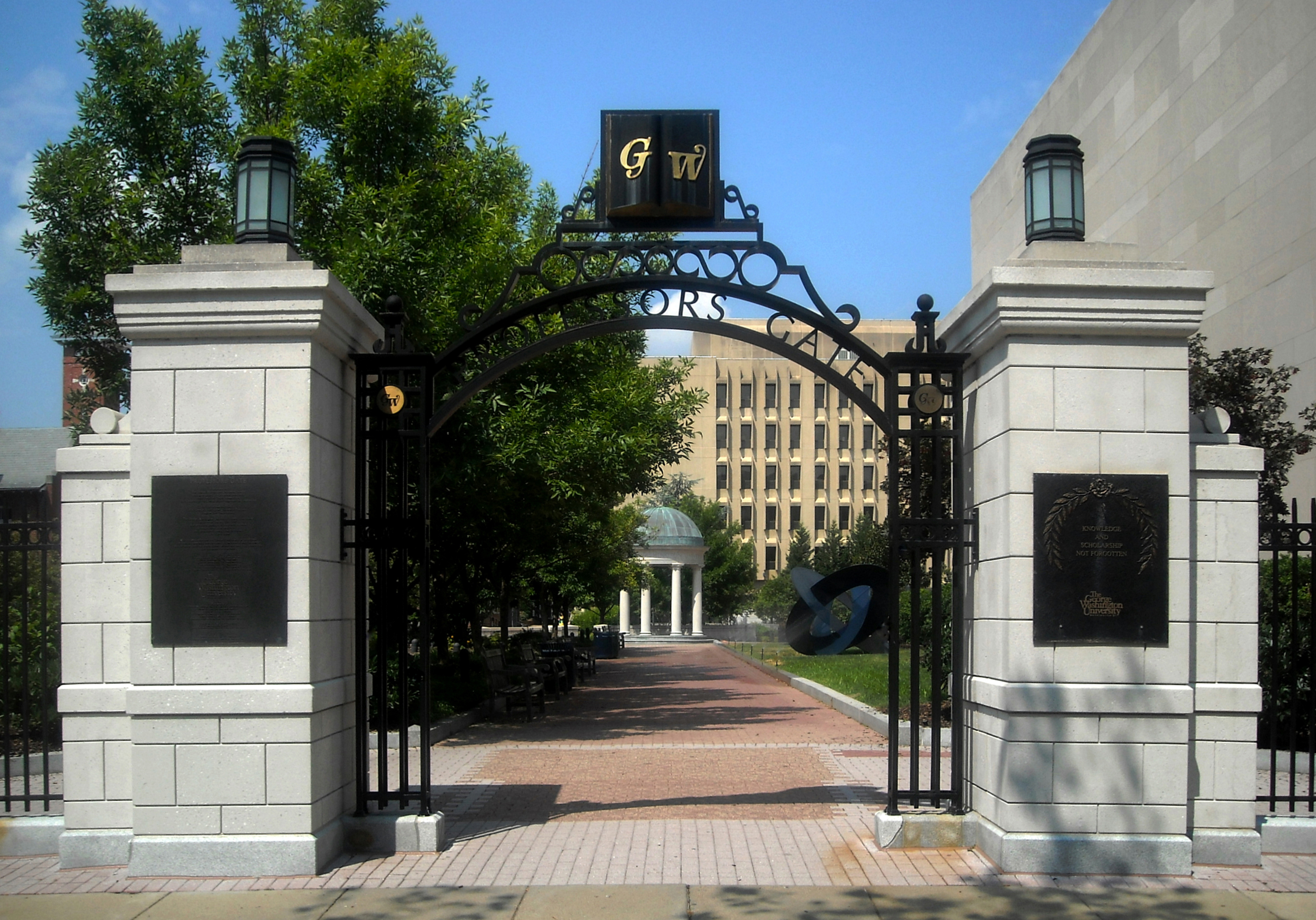
The Professors' Gate on the campus at 21st Street, N.W.

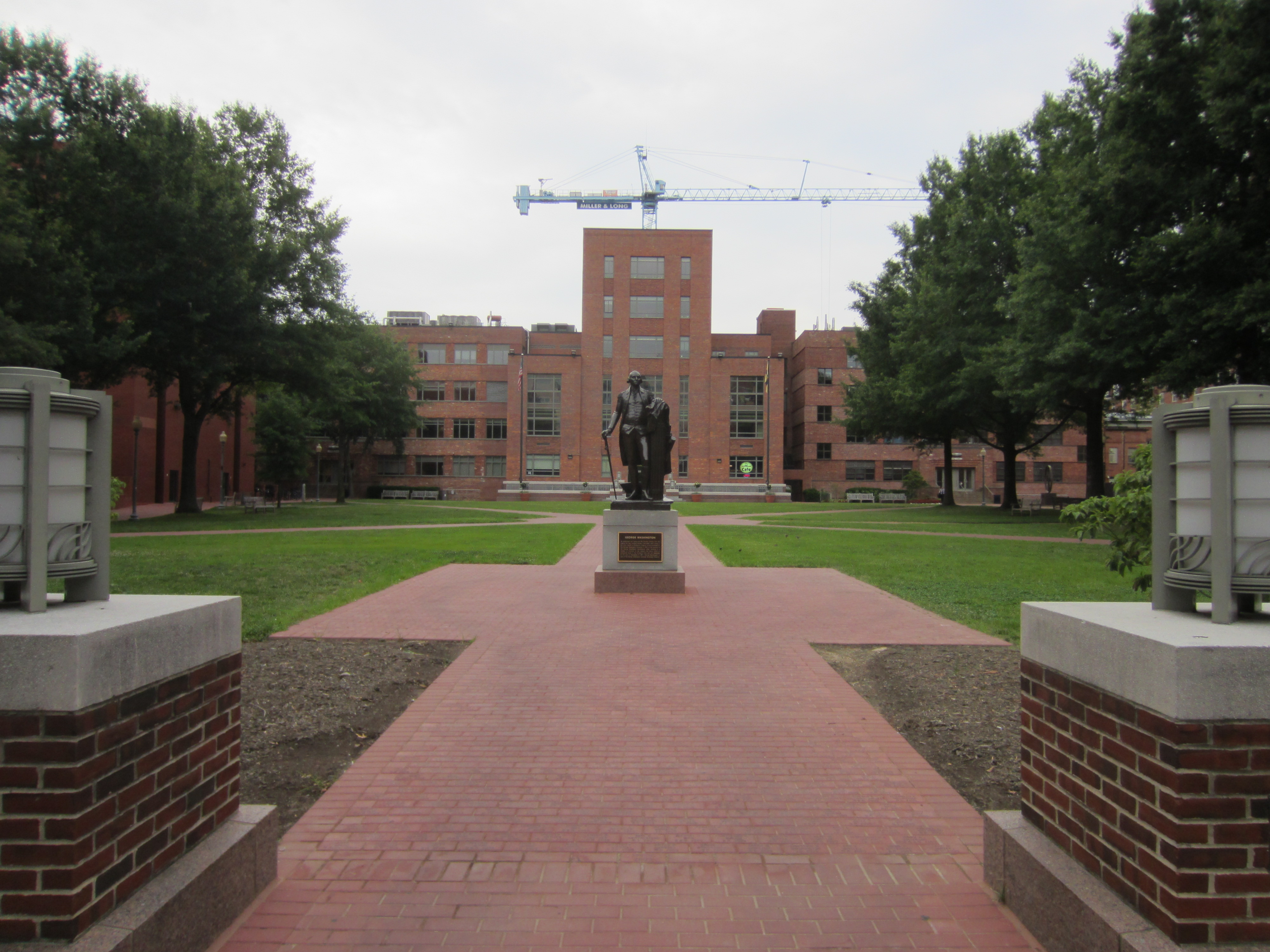
University Yard

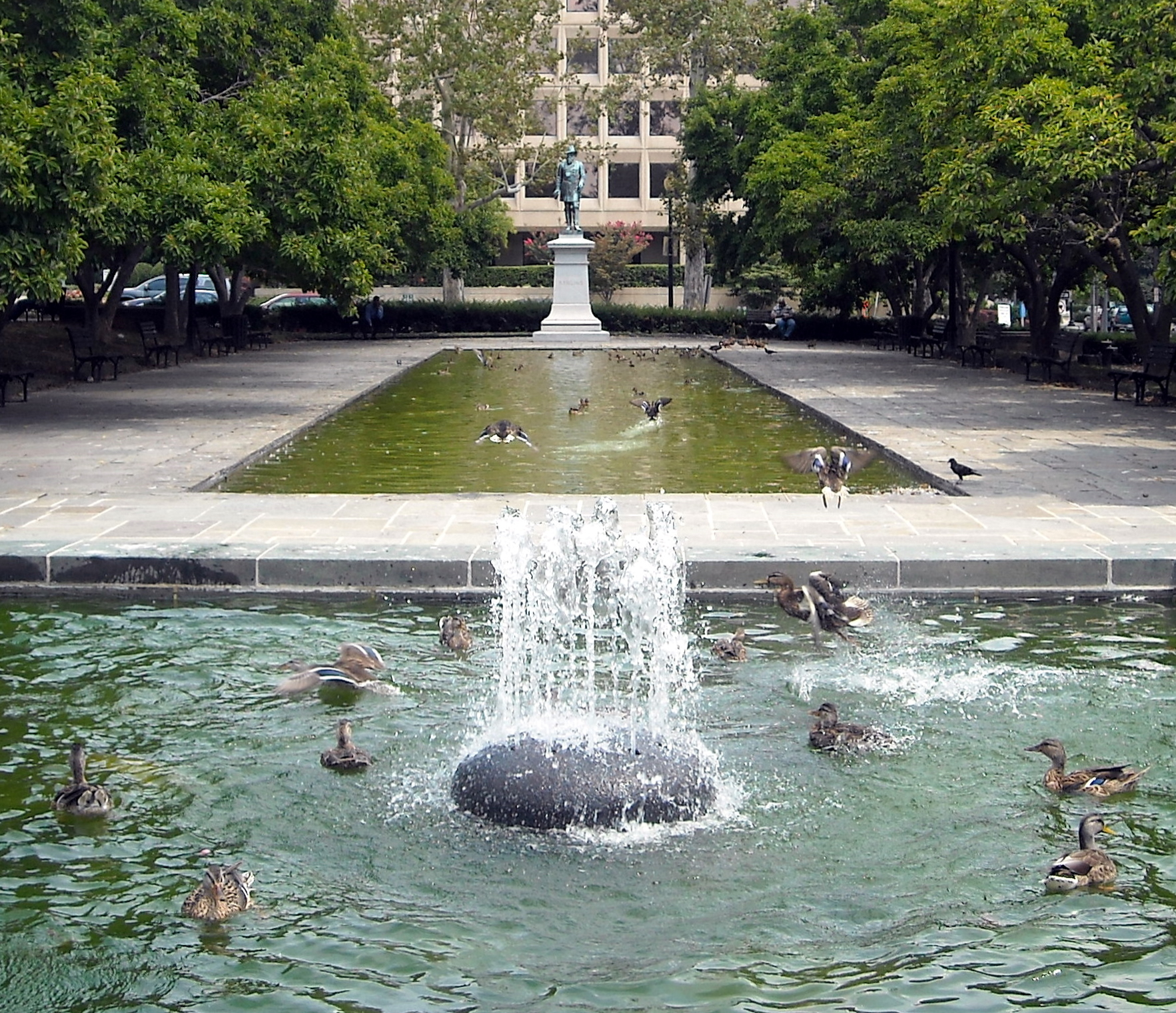
Rawlins Park, located between the Elliott School of International Affairs and the U.S. Department of the Interior

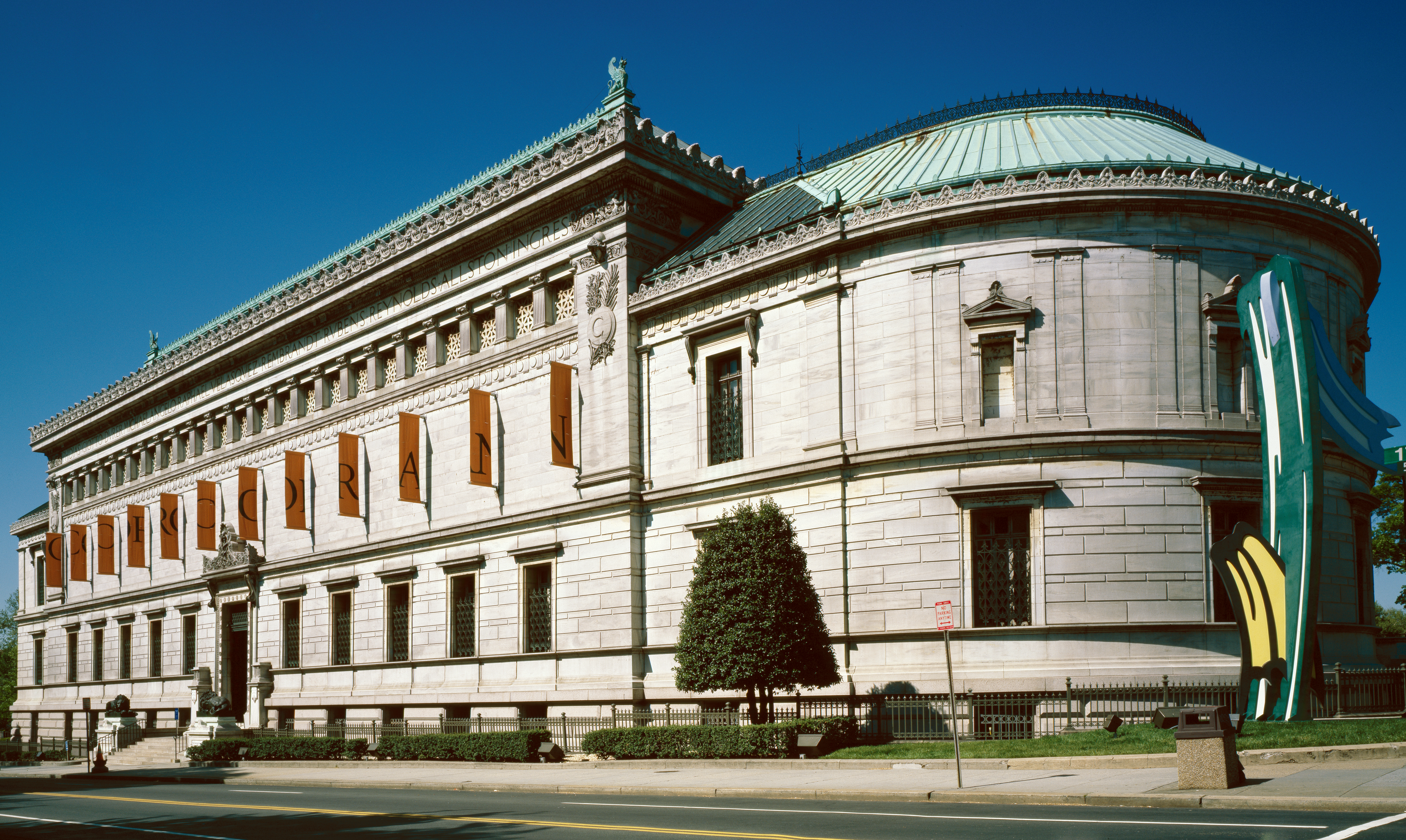
The Corcoran School of the Arts and Design in the Corcoran Gallery, the city's oldest private cultural institution and a National Historic Landmark, located on The Ellipse, facing the White House

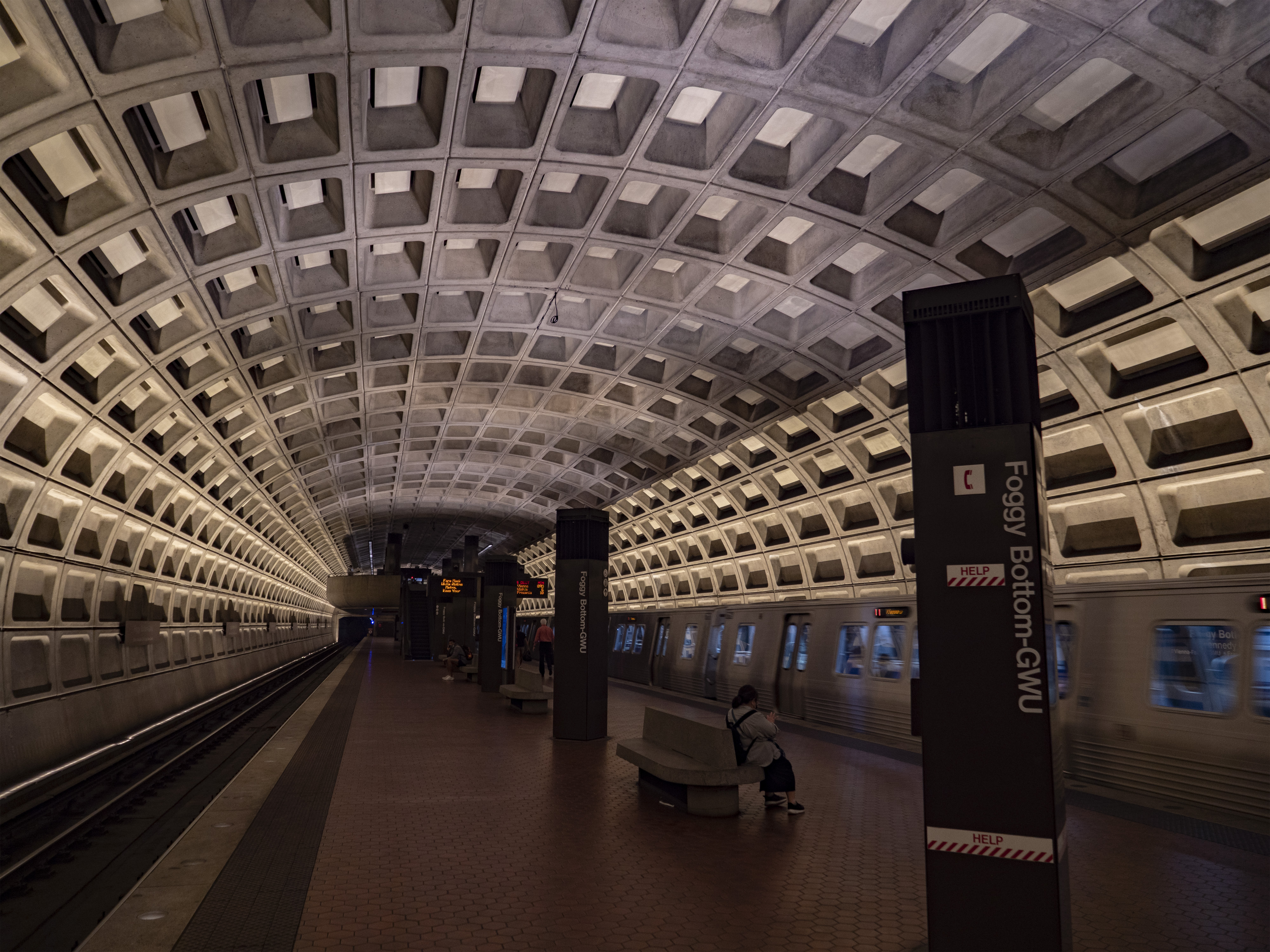
Washington Metro's Foggy Bottom–GWU station on the university's campus

The main GW campus consists of 43 acres (170,000 m^{2}) in historic Foggy Bottom and is located a few blocks from the White House, the World Bank, the International Monetary Fund, State Department and the National Mall. Barring a few outlying buildings, the boundaries of campus are delineated by (running clockwise from Washington Circle) Pennsylvania Avenue, 19th Street, E Street, Virginia Avenue, 24th Street, and New Hampshire Avenue. The university owns much of the property in Foggy Bottom and leases it to various tenants, including the World Bank and the International Monetary Fund. Other institutions in proximity include the U.S. State Department, the Kennedy Center, the U.S. Institute of Peace, the Watergate complex, and embassies of Bosnia and Herzegovina, Mexico, Saudi Arabia, Spain, and Uruguay. The University Yard is the main open space and historic heart of the university. Along with George Washington's main library, Gelman Library, it constitutes the hub of the main campus. The seven-story Gelman Library building contains over two million volumes and is constructed in the Brutalist architectural style of the 1970s. It features a concrete façade punctuated by windows that are divided by projecting vertical slabs. For most of the year, parts of the library are open 24 hours a day, seven days per week for use by students, faculty, and staff. The library's seventh floor includes the Special Collections Research Center, National Security Archives, Global Resources Center, and Kiev Library.

The National Security Archives (NSA) is a research institution that publishes declassified U.S. government files concerning selected topics of American foreign policy. It was a National Security Archive Freedom of Information Act request that eventually made the Central Intelligence Agency's so-called "Family Jewels" public.

Close to the library is Lisner Auditorium and a large open area between them is known as Kogan Plaza. Southeast of the plaza and located near Monroe Hall and Hall of Government is the Monroe Court, a landscaped area with a large fountain. The Foggy Bottom–GWU Washington Metro station is located at the intersection of 23rd and I Streets NW due south of Washington Circle, and provides access to the Orange, Blue and Silver lines. The University Hospital is located next to the Metro station entrance.

The Foggy Bottom campus contains most of the residence halls in which GW students live. The most notable include Shenkman Hall, Thurston Hall, Madison Hall, Potomac House, Fulbright Hall, Mitchell Hall, Munson Hall, Jacqueline Bouvier Kennedy Onassis Hall, Phillip Amsterdam Hall, Guthridge Hall, Madison Hall, Townhouse Row, South Hall, and the newest, District House, which opened in 2016.

In late 2007, construction began on a large mixed-use residential, office and retail development located on the site of the old GW Hospital (Square 54) and just east of the Foggy Bottom–GW Metrorail station. It was the second-largest undeveloped lot in the District of Columbia at the time of initial construction activity. In 2014, the university assumed ownership of the Corcoran Gallery of Art, the oldest private art museum in Washington, D.C. and independent college of art and design. The college of art and design became The Corcoran School of the Arts and Design under the Columbian College of Arts and Sciences. The National Gallery of Art will acquire many of the 17,000 pieces of art from the Corcoran and the rest will be donated to other museums around the country. In May 2014, GW opened the Milken Institute School of Public Health, a nine-story building that received LEED certification for sustainability features including a green roof, rainwater collection system, and special heating and air conditioning technologies that helps mass air displacement. The Textile Museum reopened to the public in March 2015 after the institution merged with the university in 2011 and closed it for renovations two years later.

=== Mount Vernon ===
In 1996, the university purchased the Mount Vernon College for Women in the city's Palisades neighborhood that became the school's coeducational Mount Vernon Campus. Initially, the Mount Vernon Campus remained exclusively a women's college until 1999 when GW changed its operations to a co-ed facility. It was purchased so that the university could gain more space and valuable land for athletics, such as for the women's soccer team. Now known as the Mount Vernon campus, it is totally integrated into the GW community, serving as a complement to the Foggy Bottom campus. The campus has transportation systems connecting the students to the GW campus in Foggy Bottom. It also includes Eckles Library, six residence halls, Lloyd Gymnasium, The GW-Mount Vernon Athletic Complex and other various campus facilities.

=== Virginia ===
The George Washington University also operates a research and graduate campus in Ashburn, Virginia (near Dulles International Airport) which was established in 1991. Starting with a donation of 50 acres (20 ha) from Robert H. Smith, the campus grew to 101 acres (41 ha) by 2010. Besides graduate education, this campus also offers undergraduate education to students, including Health Science, Cybersecurity & Information Technology, and Nursing.

Additionally, the university also operates several other graduate satellite education centers. These include the Alexandria Graduate Education Center in Alexandria, the Graduate Education Center in Arlington, and the Hampton Roads Center in Newport News. The Virginia Science and Technology Campus hosts research and educational partnerships with industry and government officials and offers more than 20 graduate degrees.

The Virginia Science and Technology Campus is home to the first walkable solar-power sidewalk in the world. The project began in 2012 and was completed two years later, inaugurated in October 2014. In February 2026, the university sold the campus to Amazon Data Services, which plans to develop a data center on the land, for $427 million. The contract allows the university to remain on the property for up to five years to allow programs to relocate. On October 20, 2026, Amazon agreed to withdraw permits and drop legal actions for building datacenters on this site due to public sentiment. The collaboration with Loudon County, named Project Potomac Promise, includes transferring 25 acres of the land back to the county, with the remaining 97 acres planned for mixed use development.

== Organization ==
George Washington University is governed by the GW Board of Trustees, the President of the George Washington University, provost, deans, and department chairs. The university employs over 6,000 faculty members, administrators, and support staff. In 2007, Steven Knapp was named the university's sixteenth president; he had previously taught at the University of California, Berkeley and was later the provost at Johns Hopkins University. The current President of the George Washington University is Ellen Granberg. Ulysses S. Grant was a member of the Board of Trustees, and his Grandson, Ulysses S. Grant III, was Vice President of GW. John Quincy Adams was also a member of the board of trustees.

=== Schools and colleges ===
Schools of The George Washington University
| Name | Year founded |
|---|---|
| Columbian College of Arts and Sciences | 1821 |
| Corcoran School of the Arts and Design | 1878 |
| School of Business | 1928 |
| Elliott School of International Affairs | 1989 |
| Milken Institute School of Public Health | 1997 |
| School of Engineering and Applied Science | 1884 |
| School of Nursing | 2010 |
| School of Media and Public Affairs | 1938 |
| Graduate School of Political Management | 1987 |
| School of Medicine & Health Sciences | 1824 |
| Law School | 1865 |
| Graduate School of Education & Human Development | 1909 |
| Trachtenberg School of Public Policy and Public Administration | 2003 |
| College of Professional Studies | 2001 |

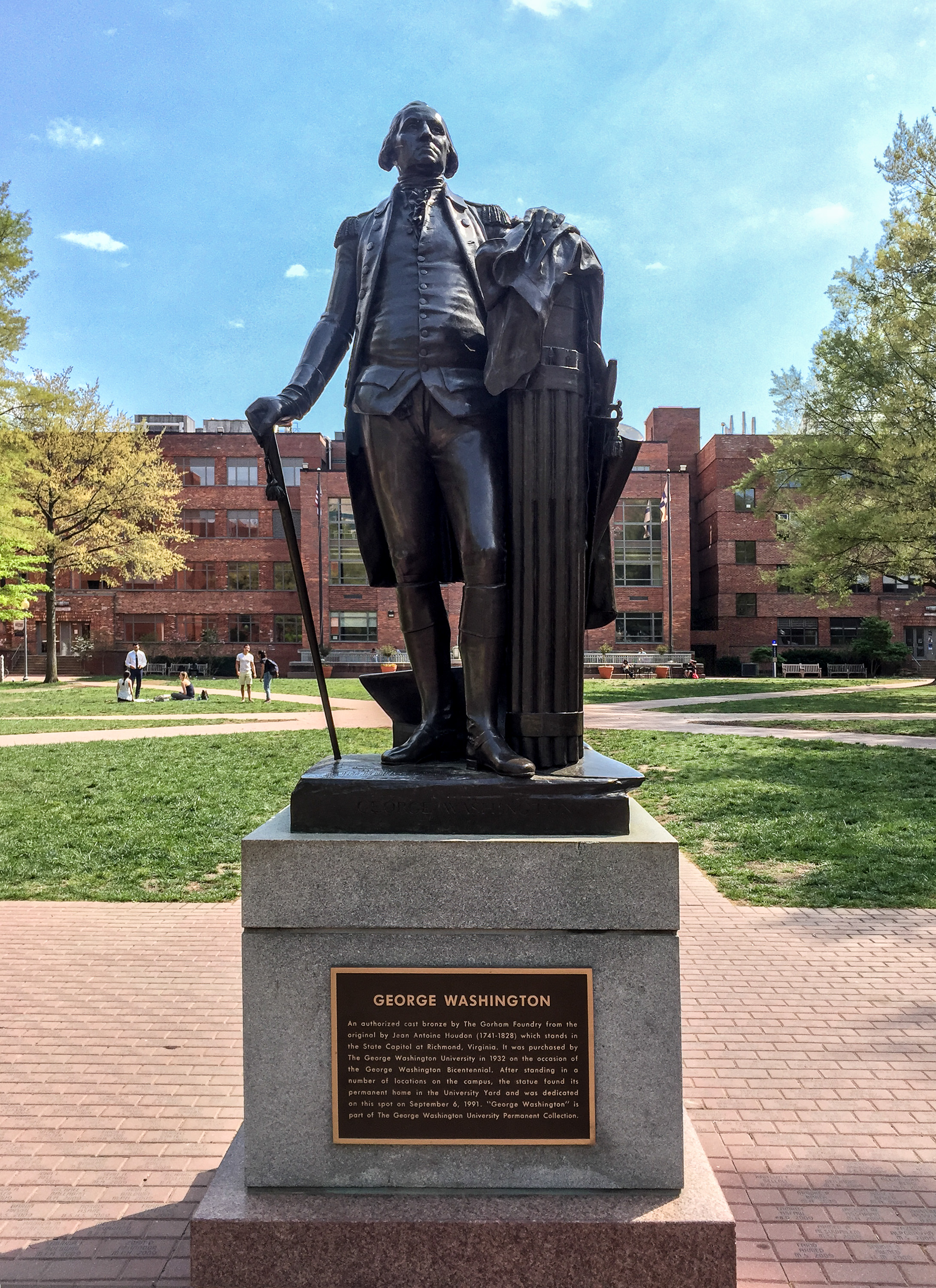
Jean-Antoine Houdon's George Washington, a statue of George Washington in University Yard

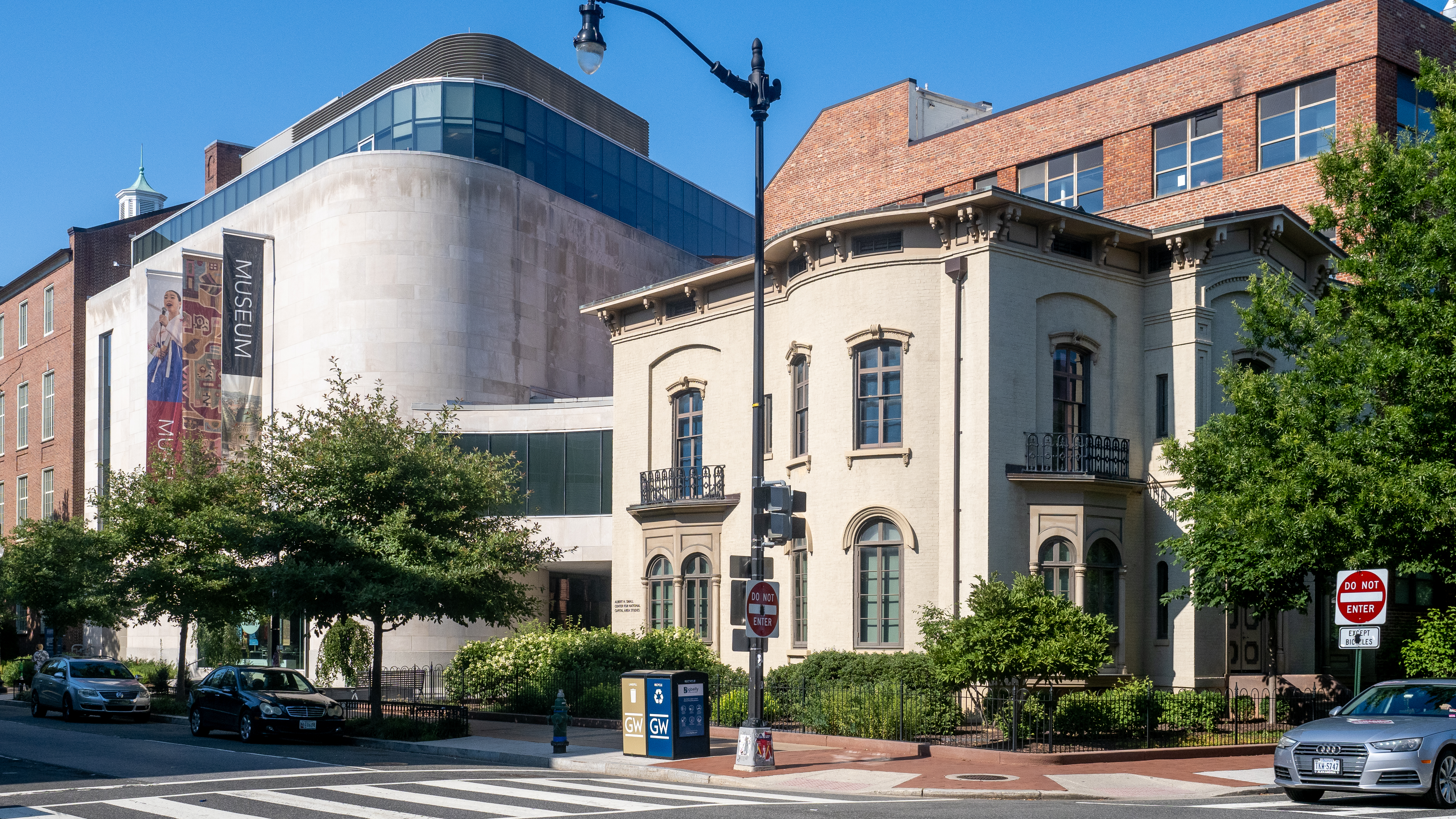
The George Washington University Museum

GW is organized into fourteen schools and colleges, each with a different dean and organization. The Columbian College of Arts and Sciences was the original academic unit of the university. The Medical School is the 11th oldest medical school in the nation and the first to open in the District of Columbia. The Law School was also the first law school in the District of Columbia. Each academic unit has a distinct identity within the broader university. The Graduate School of Political Management and the Corcoran School of the Arts and Design were organized outside of the university, later to join in 1987 and 2014, respectively.

==== Columbian College of Arts and Sciences ====
The Columbian College of Arts and Sciences (CCAS) is the oldest and largest college in the university. It was founded in 1821; at the beginning of the university's history, there was no distinction between this college and the university. The School of Media and Public Affairs (SMPA), and the Trachtenberg School of Public Policy and Public Administration (SPPPA) belong to this college, although they are run separately. The Columbian College was among the first American institutions to grant a Doctor of Philosophy (Ph.D.), in 1888. The Columbian College is notable for its academic diversity, and offers a wide range of majors and courses of study. The Columbian College contains the Trachtenberg School of Public Policy and Public Administration, the School of Media and Public Affairs, and the Corcoran School of the Arts and Design. The Columbian College is primarily housed in Philips Hall, Rome Hall, Smith Hall of Art, MPA Building, Monroe Hall, Hall of Government, 1922 F Street, Corcoran Hall, Bell Hall, Samson Hall, Lisner Hall, and many other places around campus. The college is also present on the Mount Vernon and Virginia Campuses.

===== Trachtenberg School of Public Policy and Public Administration =====
The Trachtenberg School of Public Policy and Public Administration is a graduate school in the Columbian College of Arts and Sciences. Consistently ranked as one of the top Public Affairs Schools in the United States, it is ranked 11th nationwide by U.S. News & World Report. The Trachtenberg School offers Master of Public Policy, Master of Public Administration, and PhD degrees in Public Policy and Public Administration. The school works in partnership with the Elliott School of International Affairs, the School of Public Health and Health Services, and the Graduate School of Education & Human Development to offer a variety of concentrations for its graduates.

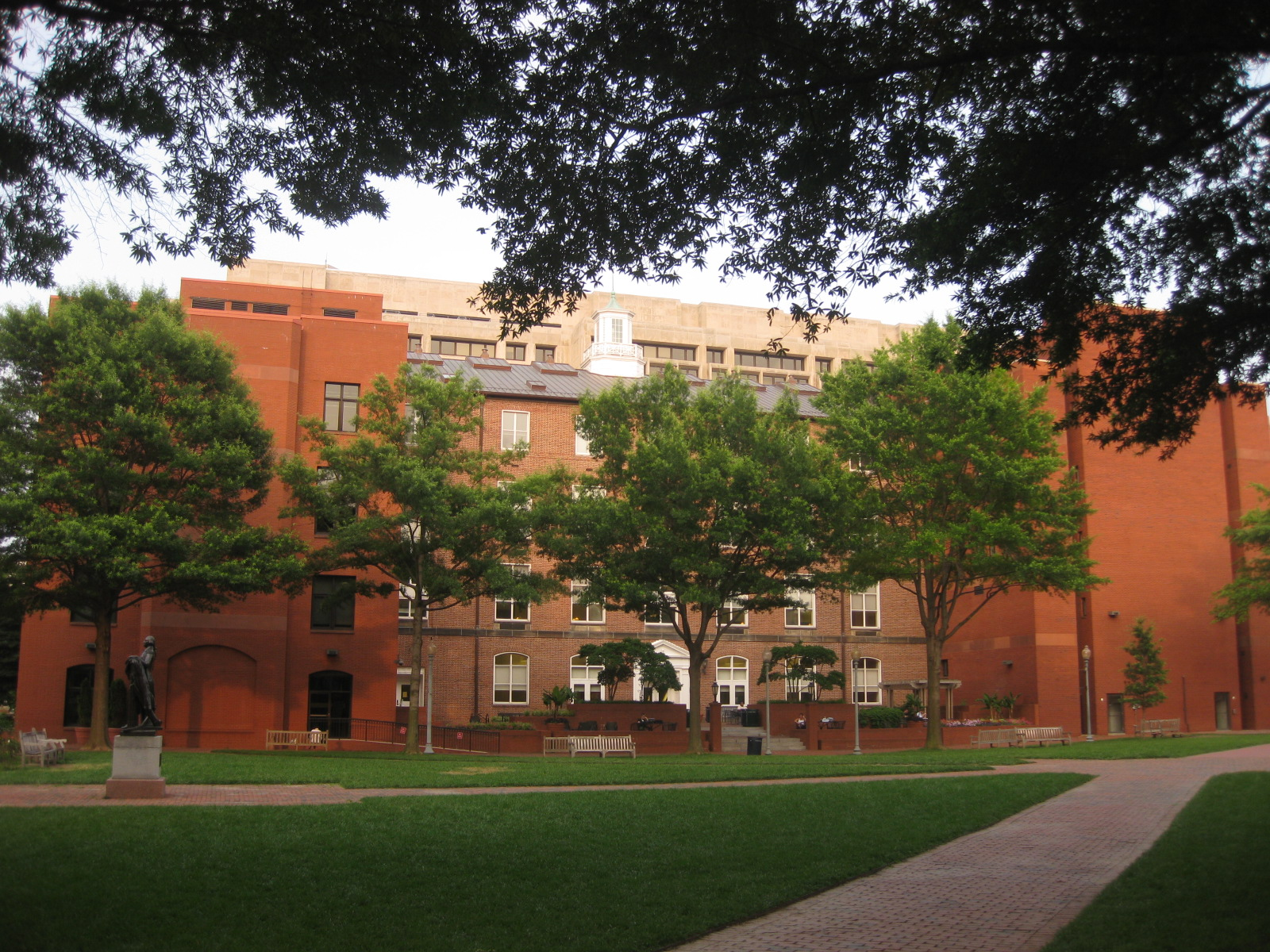
Stockton Hall

===== School of Media and Public Affairs =====
The School of Media and Public Affairs (SMPA), although run separately, belongs to the Columbian College of Arts in Sciences. It offers two undergraduate degrees, Journalism and Mass Communication and Political Communication and a master's degree in Media and Public Affairs. It is housed in the same building as the Graduate School of Political Management. The Public Affairs Project at GW, part of SMPA, is responsible for the creation and production of the PBS special, Planet Forward. School of Media and Public Affairs (SMPA) was the first in the nation to offer a bachelor's degree in Political Communication. The program boasts a faculty of retired and current professionals – including CNN correspondents, journalists, political analysts, and campaign professionals. The school is consistently ranked in the top 10 programs in the nation.

===== Corcoran School of the Arts and Design =====
The Corcoran School of the Arts and Design is one of the oldest arts education institutions in the United States. It is a school of the Columbian College of Arts and Sciences. It is housed in the Corcoran Gallery of Art, the oldest private cultural institution in Washington, D.C.

Formerly an independent institution, known as the Corcoran College of Art and Design, the institution later merged the college operations with the George Washington University. The school retained over 20 full-time faculty members, and the college will continue to function as a separate entity within the university. The school has a historic building facing the White House on 17th Street.

==== School of Business ====
The George Washington School of Business was established in 1928 with a $1 million gift by the Supreme Council of Scottish Rite Freemasonry Southern Jurisdiction. On February 6, 2006, the chairman and CEO of FedEx, Frederick W. Smith, opened a new complex for the school called Ric and Dawn Duquès Hall, which today houses the business school along with the Norma Lee and Morton Funger Hall.

As of January 2018, GW's undergraduate business program was ranked 42nd nationally and its International Business program was ranked ninth by U.S. News & World Report.

==== School of Medicine and Health Sciences ====
Founded in 1824, the School of Medicine and Health Sciences (SMHS), or simply the George Washington School of Medicine, was the first school of medicine in Washington, D.C.

In 1981, George Washington University Hospital became the center of the national spotlight when President Ronald Reagan was rushed to the emergency room after an attempted assassination.

GW Hospital's emergency department was later renamed the Ronald Reagan Institute of Emergency Medicine. Other politicians, such as former Vice President Dick Cheney, come to GW for routine and emergency procedures. Cheney and wife Lynne Cheney helped to start the Richard B. and Lynne V. Cheney Cardiovascular Institute in 2006. Others notable patients include former First Lady Laura Bush, who was treated for a pinched nerve. SMHS is primarily housed in the GW Hospital, Ross Hall, and many other centers along K Street and throughout the city.

GW was once home to the George Washington Dental College, but this department would close in 1921 due to budget constraints.

==== School of Engineering and Applied Science ====
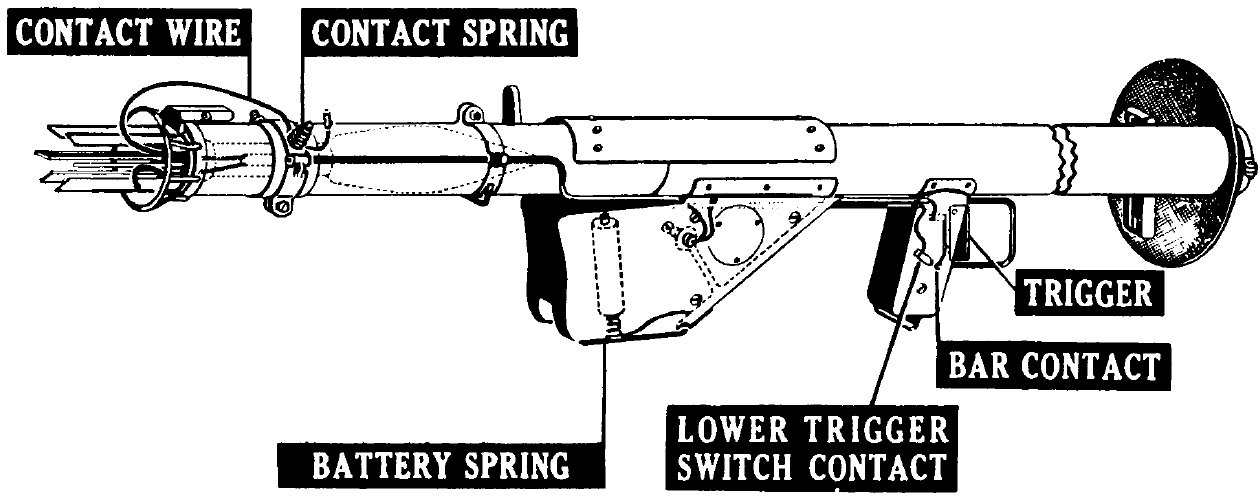
University faculty developed the recoilless anti-tank rifle, popularly known as the bazooka

The School of Engineering and Applied Science (SEAS) was founded on October 1, 1884, as the Corcoran Scientific School of Columbian University. The school separated from the Columbian College in 1962 and was one of the first to accept women for degree candidacy in engineering. The bazooka was invented at the SEAS in 1942. The school moved into the new Science and Engineering Hall in D.C. in March 2015.

==== Elliott School of International Affairs ====
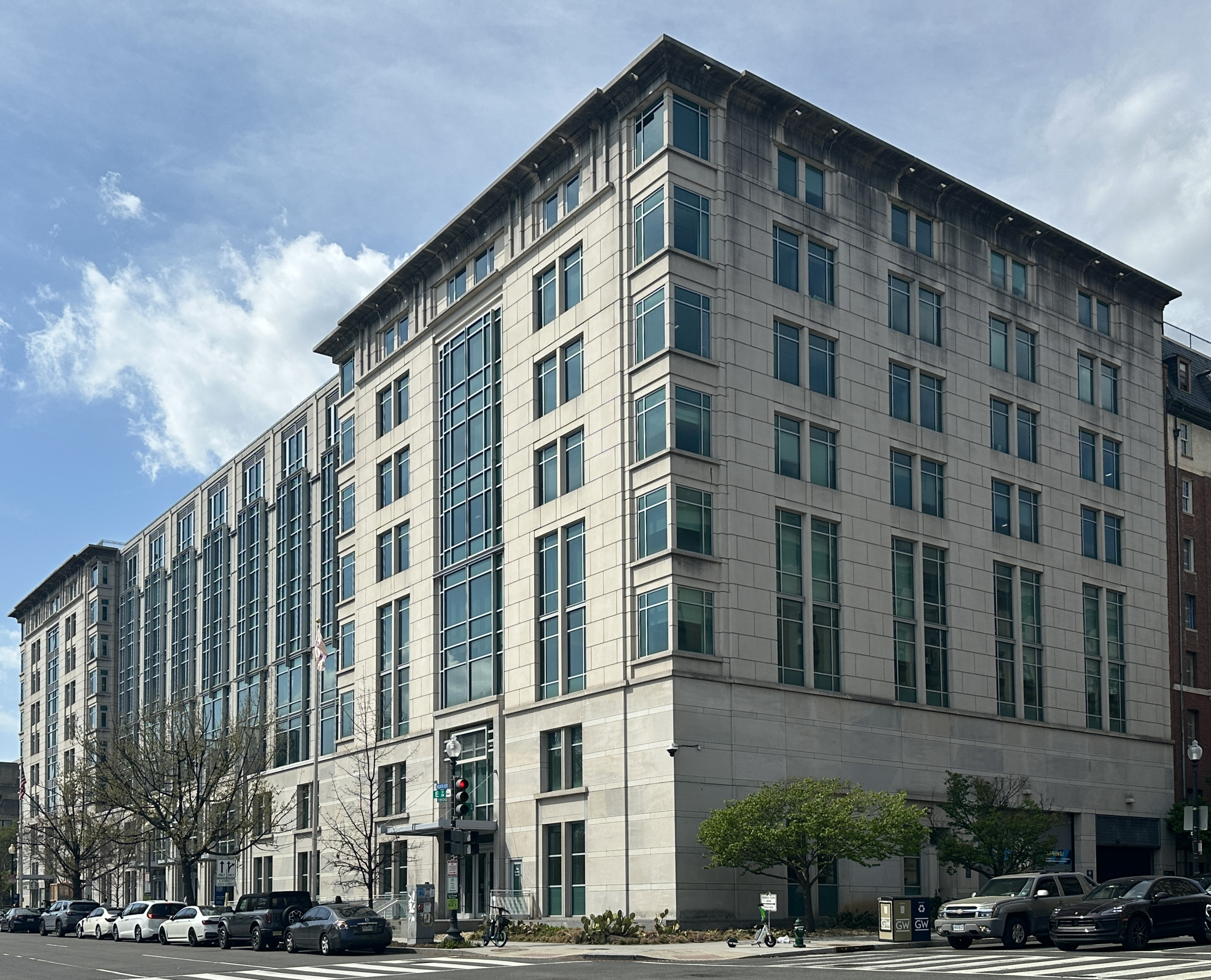
The Elliott School of International Affairs, one of the world's most highly ranked schools of international relations and the largest in the U.S.

The Elliott School of International Affairs (ESIA) was founded in 1898, as the School of Comparative Jurisprudence and Diplomacy. Under President Lloyd Elliott, the school separated from Columbian College. On September 3, 2003, alumnus Colin Powell opened a new complex for this school at 1957 E Street NW in front of the Department of State. As of February 2015, its undergraduate program was ranked eighth globally by Foreign Policy magazine, while the graduate program is currently ranked seventh in the world. ESIA is primarily housed in Elliott Hall at 1957 E St.

==== School of Nursing ====
The history of nursing education at GW spans more than 100 years. In 2002, Jean Johnson, Ph.D., RN, FAAN, then senior associate dean for Health Sciences, met with the nursing faculty to assess GW's capacity to create GW's degree programs. The faculty moved forward to develop an MSN in the GW School of Medicine and Health Sciences with programs in adult nurse practitioner, family nurse practitioner, nursing leadership and management, and clinical research administration. The first MSN class was admitted in 2004.

Meanwhile, approval was also obtained to develop a Department of Nursing Education. As the first and only chair of the department, Ellen Dawson, Ph.D., RN, ANP, led the MSN program to accreditation in time for the graduation of the first class in 2006. Also, she spearheaded the development of both the doctor of nursing practice (DNP) program and the 15-month (four consecutive semesters) accelerated second-degree bachelor of nursing science (ABSN) program located in Ashburn, VA. The first classes for these degrees were admitted in 2007 and 2009, respectively. In 2010, the GW School of Nursing was re-established and is now the university's tenth academic institution, with Jean Johnson and Ellen Dawson as the founding deans.

==== Law School ====
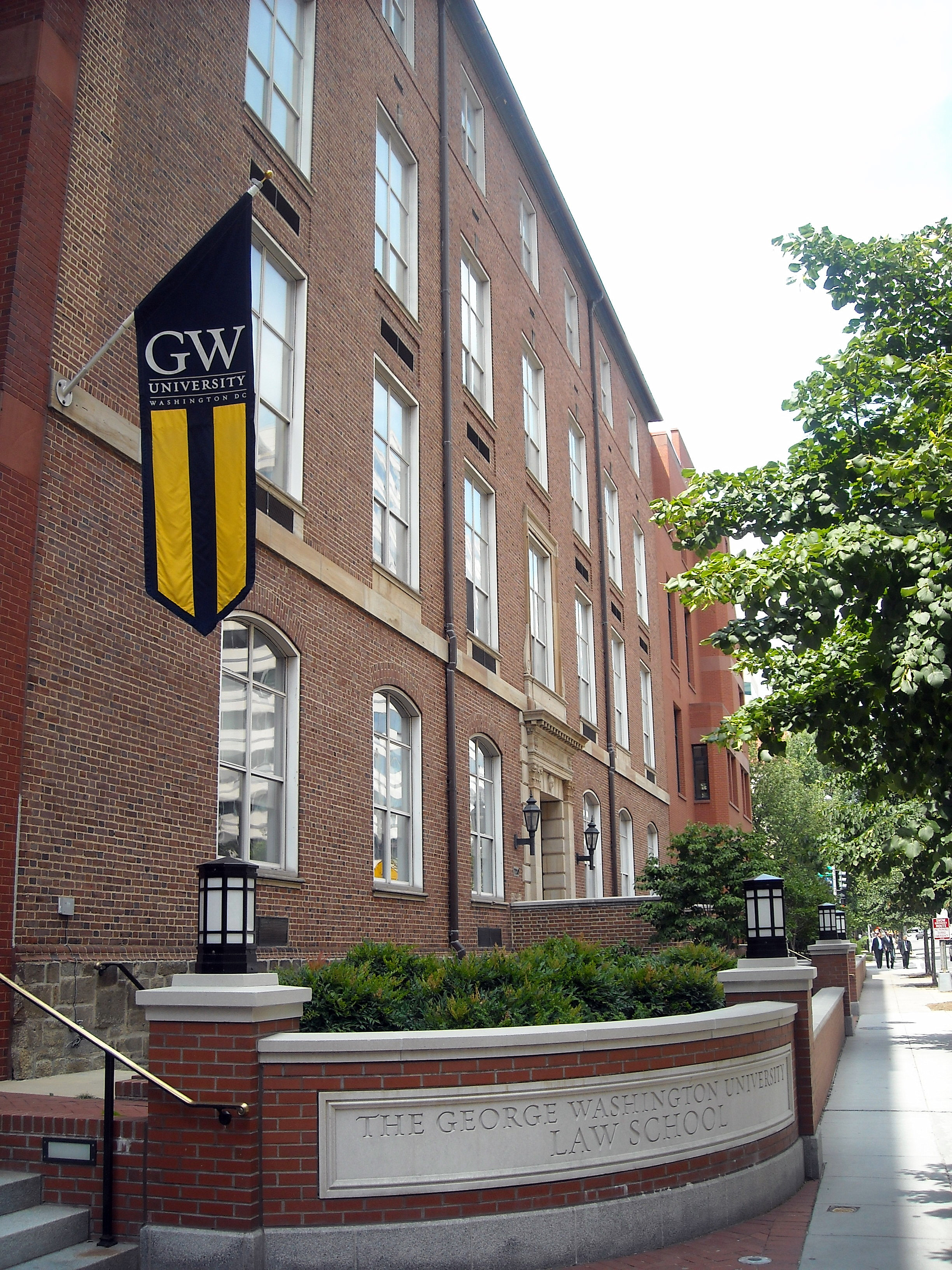
George Washington University Law School, the oldest law school in the nation's capital

The George Washington University Law School was established in 1826 and is the oldest law school in the District of Columbia. Supreme Court Justices Clarence Thomas, William Strong, David J. Brewer, Willis Van Devanter and John Marshall Harlan were among those who served on its faculty. Chief Justice John Roberts, Justice Sonia Sotomayor, Justice Samuel Alito, and Justice Antonin Scalia presided over its moot court in 2006, 2007 and 2009, respectively. The law school is located primarily on the east side of University Yard.

==== Graduate School of Education and Human Development ====
Although teacher education has been offered since the university's founding in 1904, the education division would only become a separate school in 1909 as the Teachers' College, which then became the School of Education in 1928. In 1994, the school became the Graduate School of Education and Human Development to reflect its increased focus on graduate education.

==== College of Professional Studies ====
The George Washington University College of Professional Studies (CPS) was founded during the Trachtenberg Presidency. The Graduate School of Political Management is included within the college. CPS offers courses on the Foggy Bottom and Virginia campuses.

===== Graduate School of Political Management =====
The Graduate School of Political Management (GSPM) is an academic unit of the College of Professional Studies. GSPM offers graduate degrees in legislative affairs, political management, and other related disciplines. The current director is Lara Brown.

==== Milken Institute School of Public Health ====
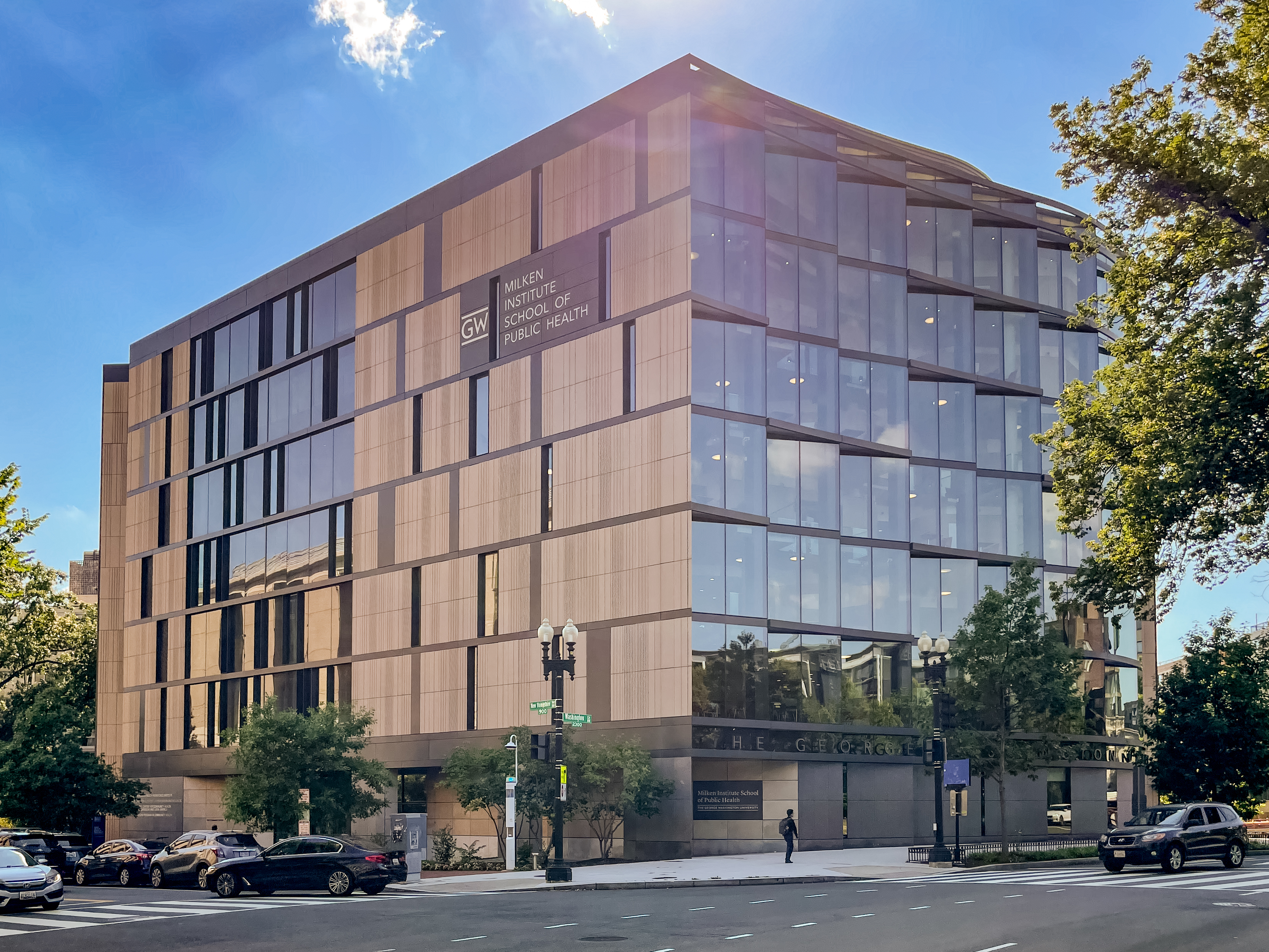
The Milken Institute School of Public Health on Washington Circle

Established in July 1997, and renamed in March 2014, the Milken Institute School of Public Health brought together three longstanding university programs in the schools of medicine, business, and education that have since expanded substantially. Today, more than 900 students from nearly every U.S. state and more than 35 nations pursue undergraduate, graduate, and doctoral-level degrees in public health. Its student body is one of the most ethnically diverse among the nation's private schools of public health.

The School also offers an array of joint degree programs, allowing students to couple a Juris Doctor (JD) with the Master of Public Health (MPH), or to combine an MPH with a Doctor of Medicine (MD) or an MA in International Affairs. An MPH/Physician Assistant program, the first in the world, is available at the Milken Institute SPH, as is the opportunity to serve as a Peace Corps volunteer while pursuing an MPH.

== Academics ==
Demographics of the student body (2023)
| | Undergraduate | Graduate | U.S. (2020) |
|---|---|---|---|
| White | 49.29% | 41.29% | 57.84% |
| Asian | 14.95% | 11.11% | 5.92% |
| Hispanic | 13.09% | 7.83% | 18.73% |
| Black | 7.65% | 12.06% | 12.05% |
| Two or More Races | 5.48% | 2.95% | 4.09% |
| American Indian | 0.05% | 0.17% | 0.68% |
| Pacific Islander | 0.07% | 0.13% | 0.19% |
| International | 7.68% | 19.19% | N/A |
| Unknown | 1.73% | 5.28% | N/A |
| Male | 36.80% | 39.50% | 49.50% |
| Female | 63.20% | 60.50% | 50.50% |

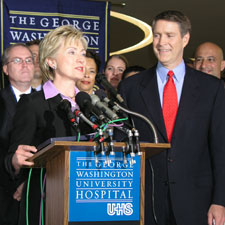
Hillary Clinton presenting the Clinton health care plan of 1993 at GW Hospital; her mother died at the hospital in 2011.

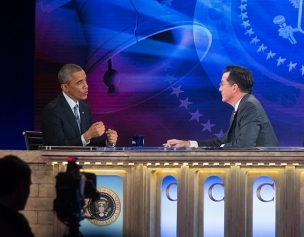
A conversation between U.S. President Barack Obama and Stephen Colbert held at Lisner Auditorium in 2014

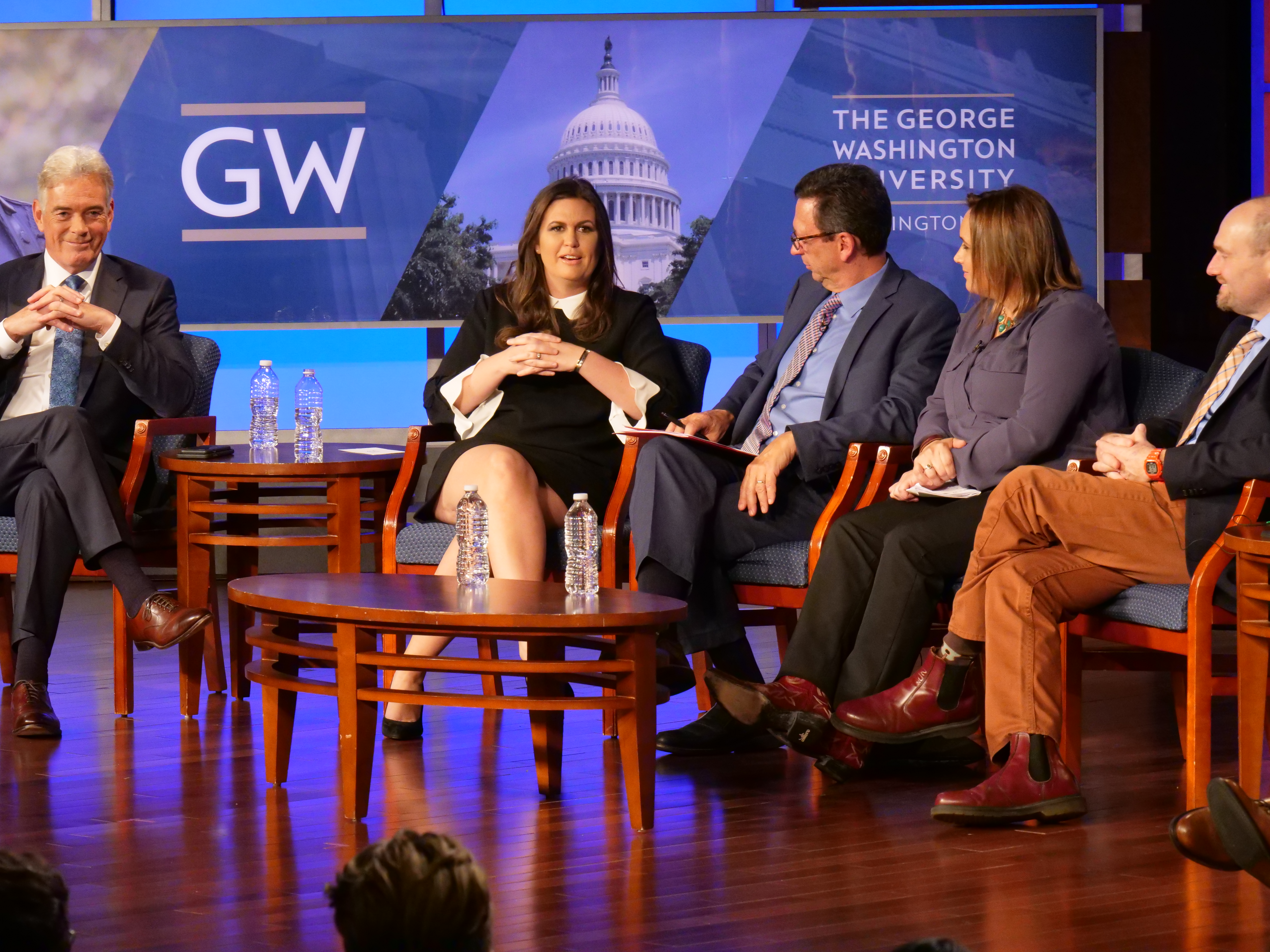
"Trump's First Year," a 2017 School of Media and Public Affairs event with White House press secretary Sarah Huckabee Sanders and chief correspondents from The New York Times, CNN, Fox News, and the president of the White House Correspondents' Association

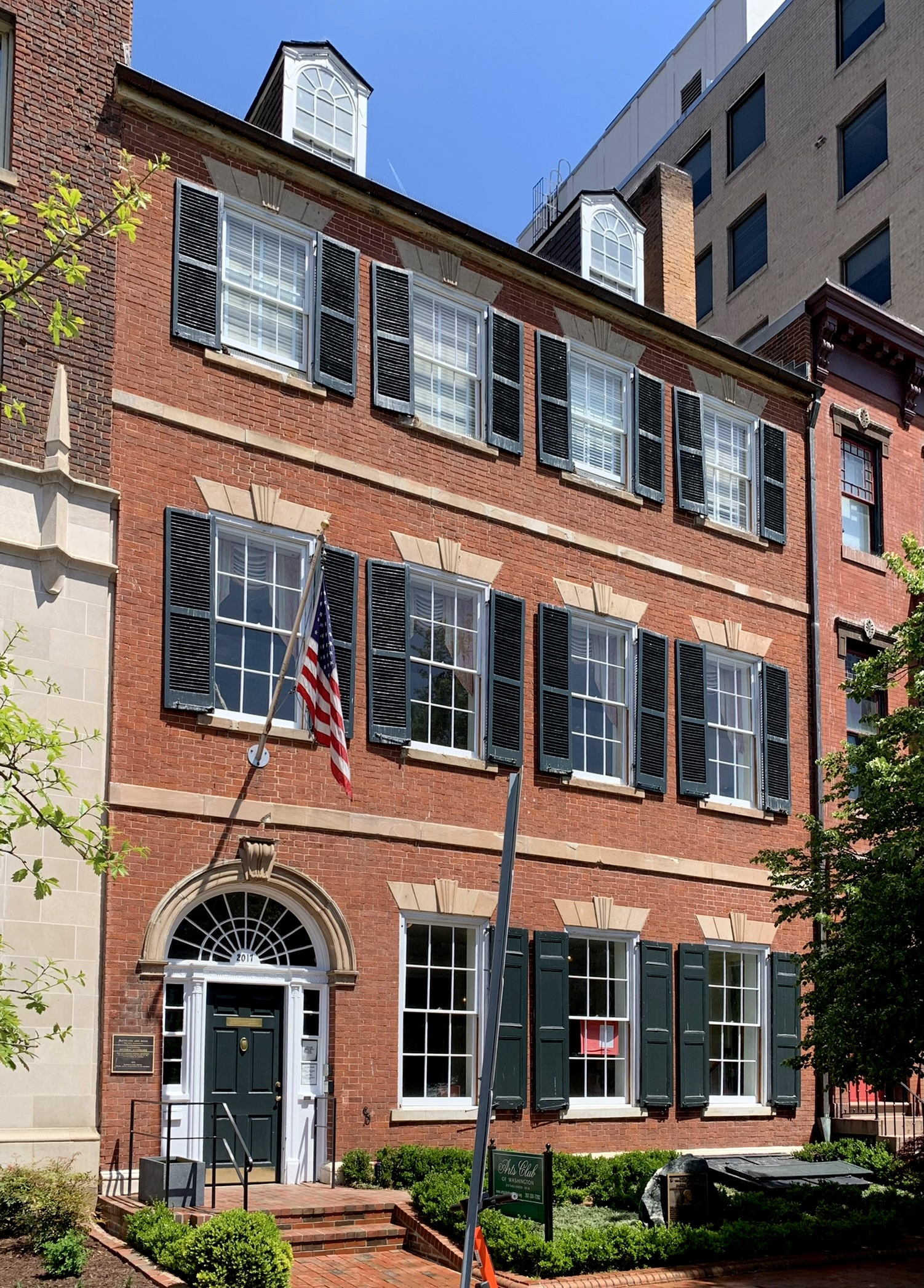
The former home of James Monroe

=== Admission ===
GW is the largest higher education institution in Washington, D.C. There are approximately 10,000 full-time undergraduates studying at George Washington University, and 14,000 graduate students. These students come from all 50 states and over 120 countries. Nearly 900 students participate in GW's Study Abroad Programs each semester in 50 countries. As of 2015, George Washington University no longer required the SAT and ACT test scores for applicants in order to boost the enrollment of disadvantaged students. GW tuition was guaranteed to remain at the freshman rate for up to ten continuous (full-time) semesters of undergraduate attendance at the university. GW no longer offers fixed tuition. The 2021–2022 academic year tuition rate was $59,780. Students were awarded $308.1 million in financial-aid during the 2017–2018 academic year. For the FY2011 cohort of students, the student loan default rate was 1.4, one of the lowest in the nation. For the 2010–2011 school year, the freshman retention rate was 94.3%. GW requires that students live on campus for their first two years of enrollment as undergraduates. According to self-provided data by George Washington University, as of the 2011–2012 academic year, the acceptance rate for the Medical School was 3%, receiving 10,588 applications. GW Law School's acceptance was 23%, receiving 10,021 applications. GW's Undergraduate studies' acceptance rate was 32%, receiving 21,433 applications.

In September 2013, The GW Hatchet reported that the university had a need-aware admissions policy, even though it claimed to have a need-blind policy at the time. The university subsequently admitted that its admissions policy was, in fact, need-aware.

For the 2024–2025 academic year, enrolled students had a 50th percentile SAT composite score of 1420, with SAT Evidence-Based Reading and Writing scores ranging from 680 (25th percentile) to 750 (75th percentile) and a 50th percentile of 720, and SAT Math scores ranging from 670 (25th percentile) to 750 (75th percentile) and a 50th percentile of 710.

=== Enrollment ===
During the 2013–2014 academic year, there were 5,015 undergraduates enrolled in the Columbian College of Arts and Sciences, 2,005 in the Elliott School of International Affairs, 1,566 in the School of Business, 774 in the School of Engineering and Applied Science, 367 in the George Washington University School of Medicine and Health Sciences, 174 in the Milken Institute School of Public Health, and 153 in the School of Nursing.

Students come from all 50 U.S. states. The top states include New York, California, New Jersey, Pennsylvania, Massachusetts, Florida, Illinois and Connecticut.

George Washington University has many international students at both the undergraduate and graduate levels. During the 2013–2014 academic year, there were over 130 countries represented among the student body. The most represented countries represented were China, South Korea, India, Saudi Arabia, Canada, Mexico, United Kingdom, Turkey, France, Nigeria, Pakistan, Japan, Iran, Germany, Brazil, Colombia, and Vietnam.

=== Rankings and reputation ===
Academic rankings

National
- U.S. News & World Report: 59
- Washington Monthly: 28
- WSJ/College Pulse: 58

Global
- QS: 358
- THE: 201–250
- U.S. News & World Report: 245 (tie)

GW was ranked tied for 59th by U.S. News and World Report in 2025 on its National University list.

GW was ranked 28th in "2024 National University Rankings" in Washington Monthly.

Forbes ranked GW 67th in 2025.

Misreported admissions data

In 2012, the university received national attention when GW officials announced that they had misreported admissions data on their student body for over a decade, overstating the number of students who had graduated from high school in the top ten percent of their classes due to a "data reporting error". Consequently, U.S. News & World Report removed the school from its rankings and altered the GW's entry to being unranked for the 2013. The university was reinstated a year later in the 2014 rankings.

Program rankings

The Princeton Review ranked GW first for "Top Colleges or Universities for Internship Opportunities." GW is consistently ranked by The Princeton Review in the top "Most Politically Active" Schools.

U.S. News & World Report ranks GW's international business program as eighth best in the world, its MBA program as 51st best, and its undergraduate business program as 38th best. The Financial Times ranks GWSB as the 47th best business school in the United States.

Foreign Policy ranks the Elliott School's Masters in International Affairs as the seventh best in the world in its 2018 "Inside the Ivory Tower" annual report. Foreign Policy ranks the Elliott School as being the eighth in the "Top U.S. Undergraduate Institutions to Study International Relations 2018."

U.S. News & World Report ranks the Trachtenberg School of Public Policy and Public Administration as the 10th best public affairs school in the United States and as having the 6th best Global Policy program, 11th best public management program, the 14th best health policy program, and the 20th best social policy program in the U.S.

The 2020 U.S. News & World Report ranks GW Law School as fifth best in the U.S. for its international law program, fifth best for intellectual law, second best for part-time law, and as the 22nd best law school in the United States. The National Law Journal ranked GW Law 21st for law schools that sent the highest percentage of new graduates to NLJ 250 law firms, the largest and most prominent law practices in the U.S.

George Washington is ranked 61st for the "Best Global Universities for Social Sciences and Public Health 2018" by U.S. News & World Report.

The Times Higher Education ranks GW as having the 64th best law program in the world in 2019.

== Research ==
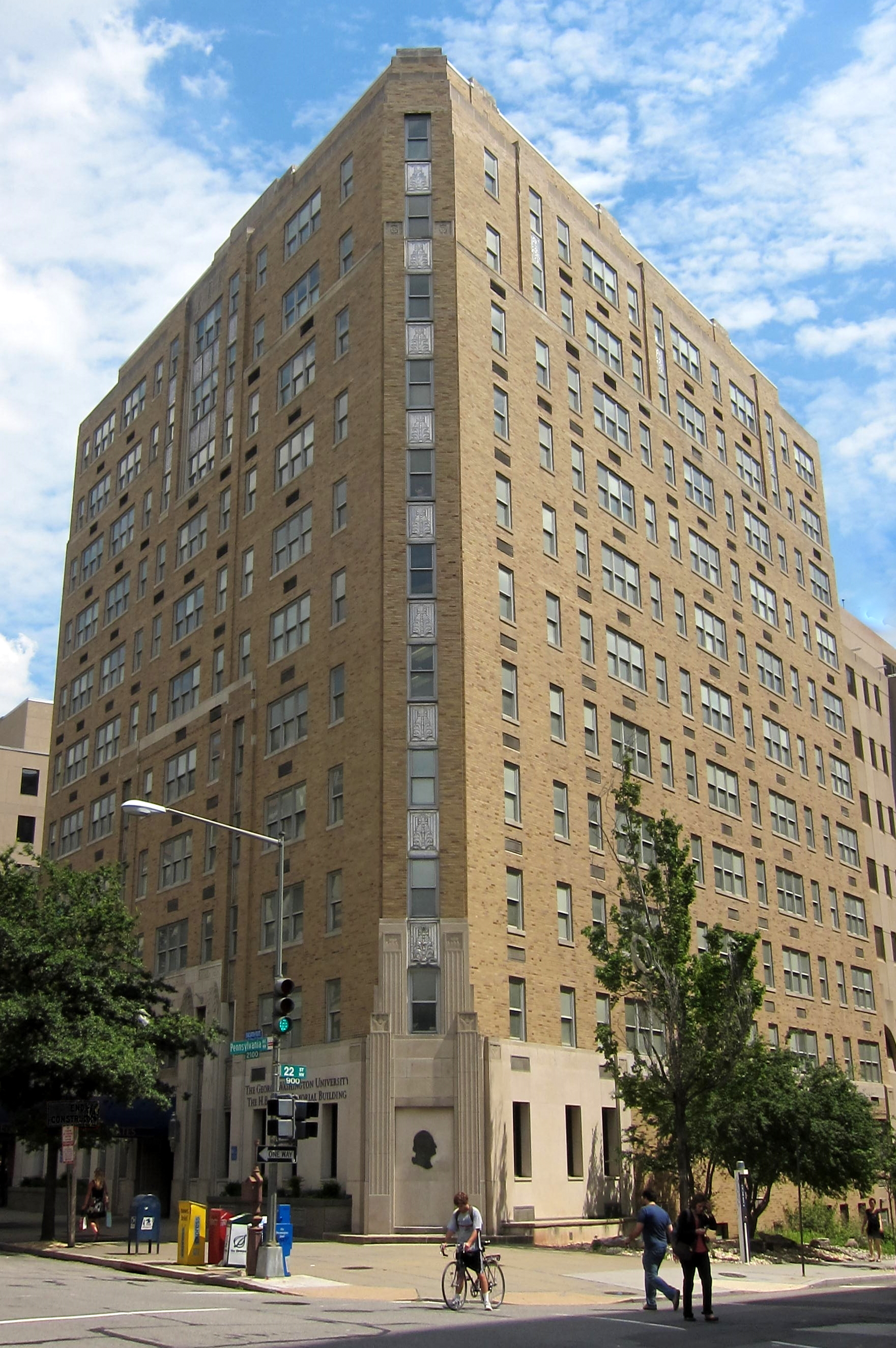
The Burns Building, which houses several medical research centers

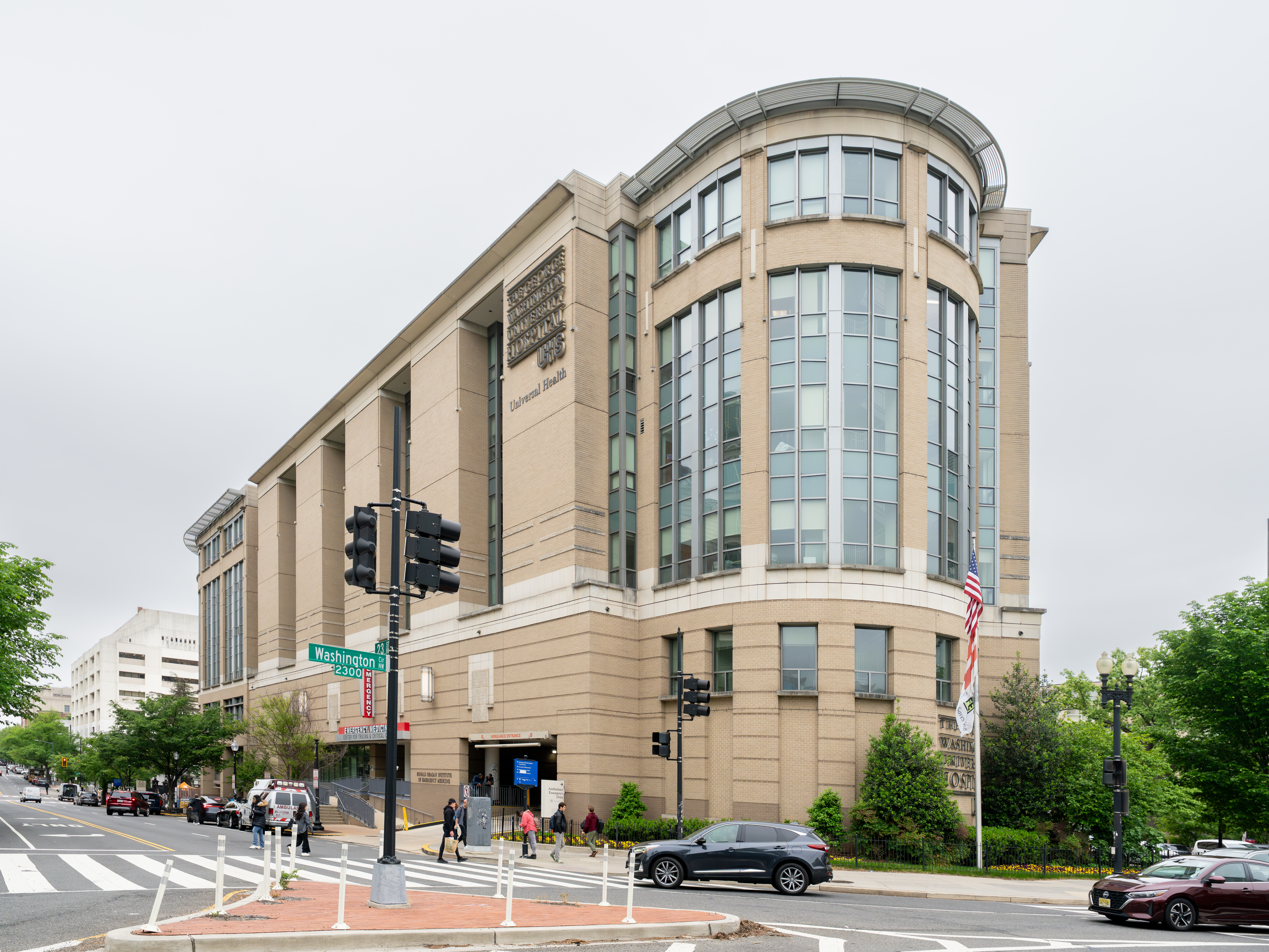
George Washington University Hospital, which houses several medical programs and occasionally serves the U.S. President's medical needs

George Washington University is the largest research university in Washington, D.C. According to the National Science Foundation, the university spent $260 million on research and development in 2018, ranking it 89th in the nation. In 2023, GW was invited to join the Association of American Universities.

=== Centers and institutes ===
George Washington University has many research centers, including:

Centers

- Sigur Center for Asian Studies
- Center for the Advanced Study of Human Paleobiology
- GW Cancer Center
- Center for Aging, Health, & Humanities
- Center for Equity and Excellence in Education
- GW Institute for Biomimetics and Bioinspired Engineering
- Center for Otolaryngology Microsurgery Education & Training (COMET)
- The Dr. Cyrus & Myrtle Katzen Cancer Research Center
- McCormick Genomic and Proteomic Center (MGPC)
- National Crash Analysis Center
- Biostatistics Center
- Regulatory Studies Center
- Center for the Connected Consumer
- The Project on Forward Engagement
- GW Project on Extremism
- Eleanor Roosevelt Papers Project
- Jackie Robinson Project
- First Federal Congress Project
- The Gill-Lebovic Center for Community Health

Institutes

- Institute for International Economic Policy
- Institute for Public Diplomacy and Global Communication
- Institute for Security and Conflict Studies
- Institute for International Science and Technology Policy
- Institute for Global and International Studies
- Institute for Disaster and Fragility Resilience
- Institute for European, Russian, and Eurasian Studies
- Institute for Middle East Studies
- Institute for African Studies
- Institute for Korean Studies
- Cisneros Hispanic Leadership Institute
- George Washington Institute for Neuroscience
- George Washington Institute for Public Policy
- GW Cancer Institute
- GW Solar Institute
- GW Institute for Biomedical Sciences
- GW Institute for Biomedical Engineering
- Rodham Institute
- Ronald Reagan Institute of Emergency Medicine
- Space Policy Institute
- Institute for Politics, Democracy & the Internet
- Institute for Security and Conflict Studies
- Computational Biology Institute
- Institute for Biomedical Engineering
- Jacobs Institute of Women's Health
- Washington Institute of Surgical Education (WISE)
- Global Food Institute

=== University press ===
The George Washington University Press is a university press affiliated with George Washington University. Established in 1934, the press's first publication was the work Modern Hispanic America (edited by A. Curtis Wilgus). The last major publication by the first iteration of the press was Elmer Louis Kayser's A Medical Center (1973). The press was later re-established, functioning as a "teaching press" that provides students with experience producing academic scholarship. This iteration of the George Washington University press is an introductory member of the Association of University Presses.

== Student life ==
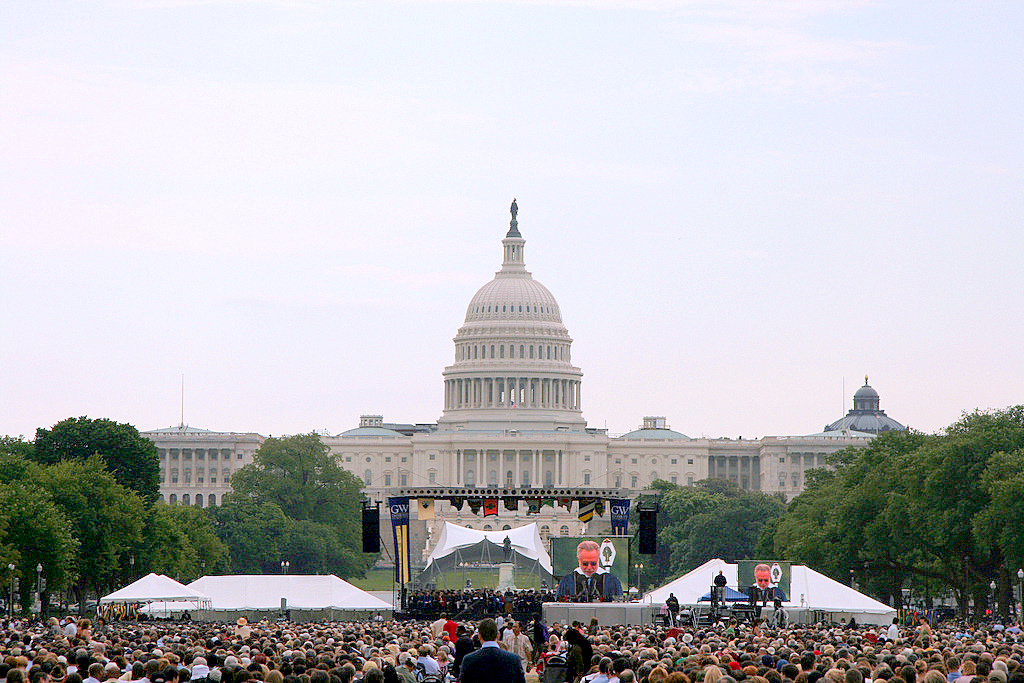
The university's commencement ceremony on the National Mall in front of the U.S. Capitol

The university is located in downtown Washington, D.C., near the Kennedy Center, embassies, and other cultural events. Students are known as highly politically active; Uni in the USA stated that "politics at George Washington is about as progressive as it gets".

GW has a Division I athletics program that includes men's baseball, basketball, cross country, golf, gymnastics, women's lacrosse, women's rowing, soccer, women's softball, swimming, women's tennis, women's volleyball and men's water polo. Revolutionaries athletics teams compete in the Atlantic 10 Conference. The Division II men's and women's Rugby Teams both compete in the Potomac Rugby Union.

=== Student organizations ===
Most student organizations are run through the George Washington University Student Government Association (SGA). The SGA is fashioned after the federal government with an executive, legislative, and judicial branch. There are over 500 registered student organizations on campus. The largest student organization on campus, the GW College Democrats have hosted speakers such as CNN contributor Donna Brazile and former DNC Chairman Howard Dean among many others. Likewise, the GW College Republicans, the largest CR chapter in the nation, have been visited by politicians like John Ashcroft, former Florida Governor Jeb Bush, and former President George W. Bush. The International Affairs Society (IAS) runs the university's internationally top-ranked Model United Nations team, in addition to hosting yearly high school and middle school Model UN conferences on campus. This organization also hosts various foreign dignitaries, US Government officials, and subject matter experts to further inform and foster international understanding both in the university's student body and the greater D.C. community.

There are also several a cappella performance groups on campus. The GW Sons Of Pitch are GW's only tenor/baritone/bass group and have released three EPs, in addition to placing as semifinalists in the 2025 ICCA competition. The university's school-sponsored a cappella group, the co-ed GW Troubadours, has been a presence on campus since the mid-1950s. A female group, the GW Pitches, was founded in 1996. The GW Sirens, another all-girls group, and the GW Motherfunkers, a coed top 40 group, were created in 2003 and 2012, respectively. Each year, the groups duke it out at the Battle of the A-Cappella groups, one of the biggest student events on GW's campus. The Sons of Pitch are the Reigning Champions. Additionally, the university is home to the Voice gospel choir, a group that focuses on soulful music.

Another student group, the Emergency Medical Response Group (EMeRG) provides an all-volunteer 24/7 ambulance service for the campus and the Foggy Bottom/West End community at no cost. EMeRG has been active on campus since 1994 and has advanced from bike response into a two-ambulance system that is sanctioned by the District of Columbia Department of Health and DC Fire and EMS (DCFEMS). EMeRG also plays an active role in special events in around the DC area including the Marine Corps Marathon, National Marathon, Cherry Blossom Race, commencement, inauguration, and other events in downtown D.C. and on the National Mall.

GW has a large Greek community with over 3,000 students consisting of just under 27 percent of the undergraduate population. Greek organizations are divided between and governed by the Inter-Fraternity Council with 8 chapters, the Panhellenic Association with 10 chapters, the National Pan-Hellenic Council with seven chapters, and the Multicultural Greek Council with seven chapters. The university is also home to the Epsilon Chapter of Sigma Chi, founded in 1864, one of the oldest continuously active fraternity chapters at the university and among the earliest Sigma Chi chapters nationally. Other Greek life, known as "Alternative Greek Life" or simply "Alt-Greek", exists on campus in the form of professional, community service–based, and honor groups; these are not under the university's traditional Greek life governing structure and are instead considered separate student organizations.

=== Scholarly societies ===
There are chapters of many varied academic groups at the university. The local chapter of the Society of Physics Students was at one time under the auspices of world-renowned scientists like George Gamow, Ralph Asher Alpher, Mario Schoenberg and Edward Teller, who have all taught at the university. The Enosinian Society, founded in 1822, is one of the university's oldest student organizations. Invited speakers included Daniel Webster.

=== Campus media ===
There are four major news sources on campus: the independent student-run newspaper The GW Hatchet, which publishes articles online daily and a print edition weekly; The Rival GW, an online-only student-run publication; the online-only radio station, WRGW; and the university's official news source, GW Today. GW also publishes a peer-reviewed journal, The International Affairs Review, which is run by graduate students at the Elliott School.

==== WRGW ====
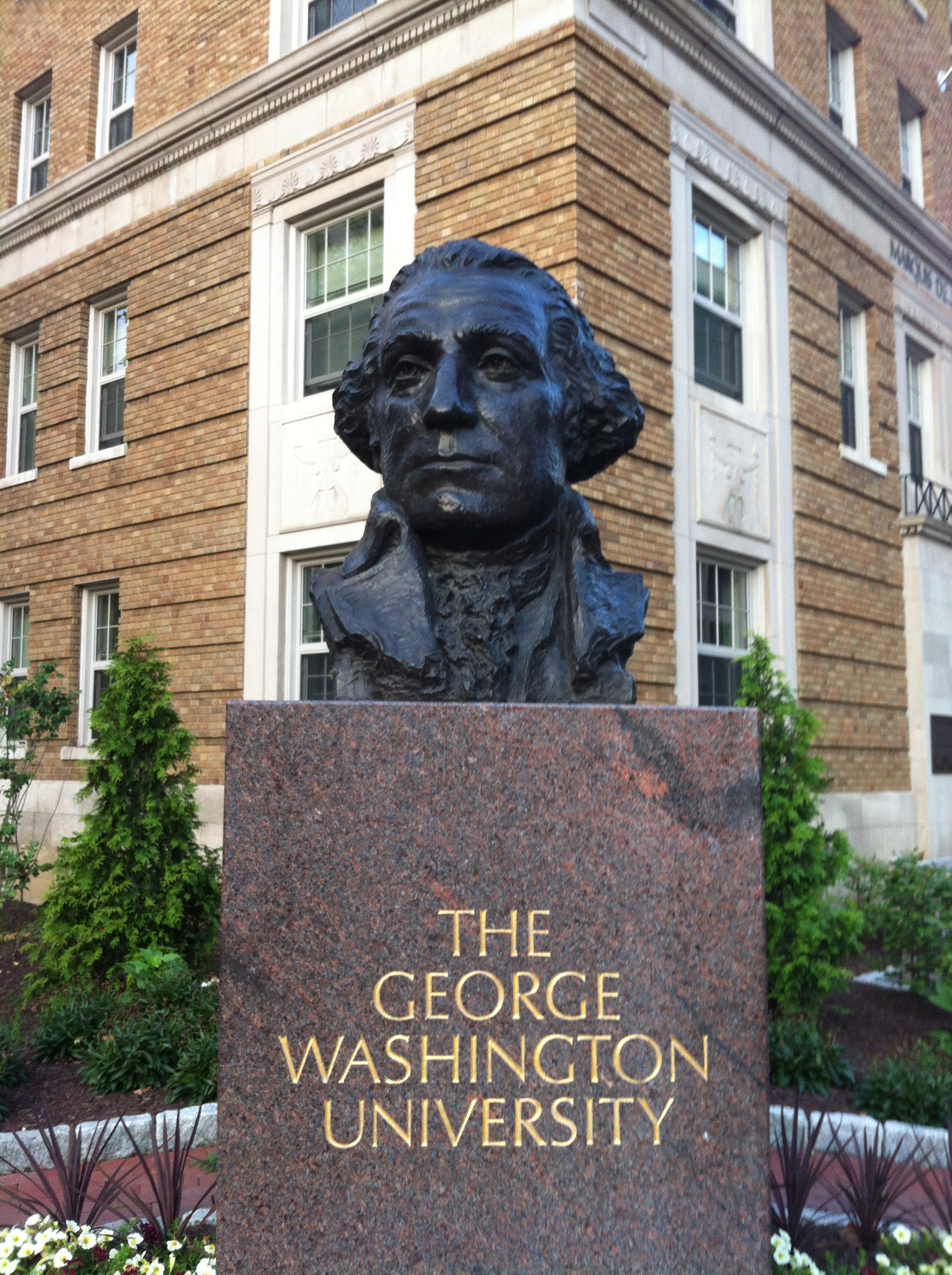
Avard Fairbanks's Busts of George Washington, located on the border of the Foggy Bottom campus

WRGW is the student-run radio station of George Washington University. It broadcasts live every day online throughout the school year between 8am and 2am. The studio is in the ground floor of the University Student Center, where it has been located since 1999. While now only available on the internet, the online broadcasts are named for a carrier current radio station that first operated on campus in 1958. That station was created as a result of efforts by GWU's Radio Club, which was founded in February 1929.

=== Environmental sustainability ===
George Washington University was ranked number 12 on The Sierra Club's magazine "Cool Schools List" for 2014 and was included in the Princeton Review's Guide to 322 Green Schools for 2013. The campus has a campus-wide building energy efficiency program along with nine LEED-certified buildings including the Milken Institute School of Public Health building. In 2016, university officials rejected demands by the student body for the university to divest from fossil fuels.

=== Religious organizations ===
George Washington University has an active Newman Center that supports the growing Catholic student community on campus.

GW Hillel serves more than 3,000 Jewish students and is one of the largest campus Hillel International organizations in the United States. In 2021, a multistory building was erected in the middle of GW's campus.

== Athletics ==
GW athletics teams, collectively known as the Revolutionaries

George Washington University is a member of the Atlantic 10 Conference and most of its teams play at the NCAA Division I level. All indoor sports play at the Charles E. Smith Center, an indoor arena on the Foggy Bottom campus. Outdoor events are held at the Mount Vernon campus Athletic Complex. The university's colors are buff and blue, with buff sometimes represented as gold or yellow. The colors were taken from the colors of George Washington's uniform during the Revolutionary War.

The official fight song is "Hail to the Buff and Blue", composed in 1924 by GW student Eugene F. Sweeney and rewritten in 1989 by Patrick M. Jones. The song is tolled twice-daily by bells atop Corcoran Hall, at 12:15pm and 6:00pm.

=== Baseball ===
The GW baseball team, founded in 1891, is a member of the Atlantic 10 Conference, which is part of the National Collegiate Athletic Association's Division I. The team plays its home games at Barcroft Park in Arlington County, Virginia, and Gregg Ritchie is the team's coach.

=== Football ===
The university had a college football team from 1881 to 1966. The team played home games primarily at Griffith Stadium and later at Robert F. Kennedy Memorial Stadium. In 1966, the football program was discontinued due to a lack of adequate facilities and the university's desire to develop an on-campus fieldhouse for basketball and other sports. GW has one alumnus in the Pro Football Hall of Fame, Alphonse "Tuffy" Leemans.

=== Men's basketball ===
The George Washington Revolutionaries men's basketball team is coached by Chris Caputo, former coach at the University of Miami.

=== Spirit programs ===
The GW Spirit Program includes a co-ed Cheer Team, the First Ladies Dance team, and the university mascot. The Revolutionaries mascot is named George, and is portrayed by a student wearing an outfit inspired by a uniform worn by General Washington. In 2012, George took first place at the National Cheerleaders Association Mascot Competition and is the university's first national champion. The spirit program also includes the GW Brass, directed by Professor Benno Fritz.

== Club sports ==
The university also has various club sports, which are not varsity sports, but compete against other colleges. Examples include: boxing, basketball, volleyball, ice hockey, figure skating, fencing, lacrosse, rugby, soccer, triathlon, tennis, ultimate frisbee, cricket, Brazilian jiu-jitsu, water polo, equestrian, and others.

== Notable people ==
=== Notable alumni ===
Notable George Washington University alumni include:

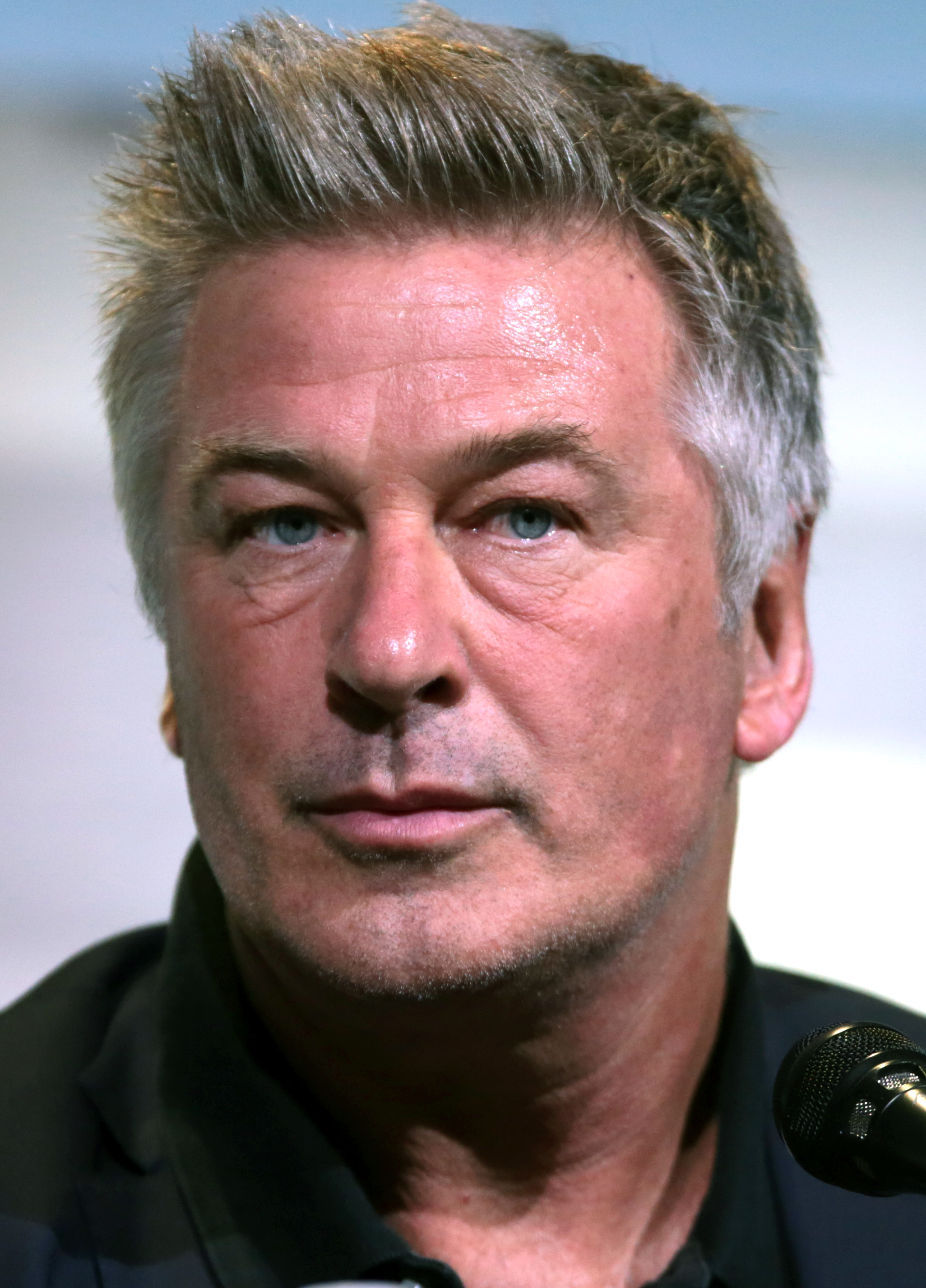
Alec Baldwin, actor; Columbian College

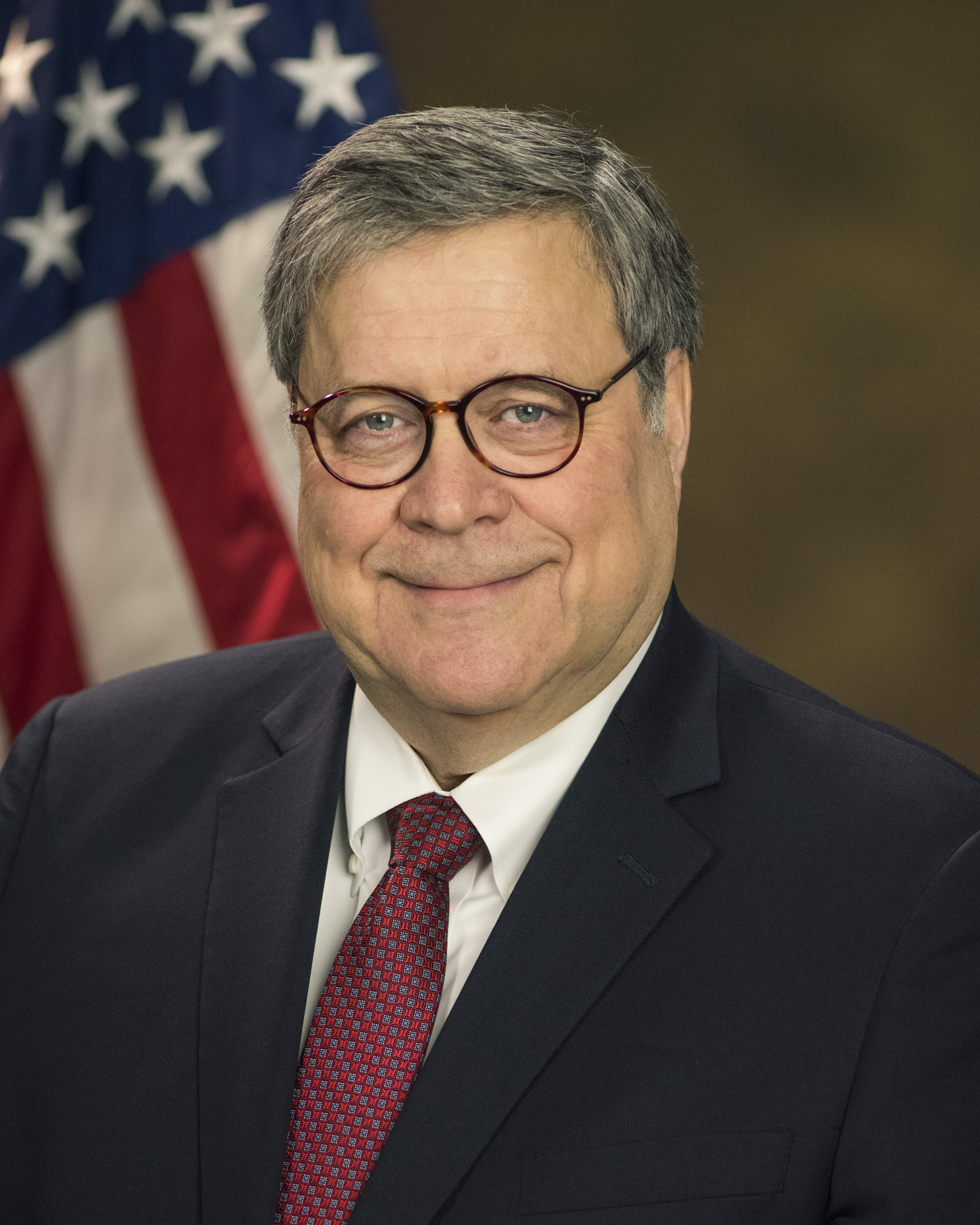
William Barr, U.S. Attorney General; Law School

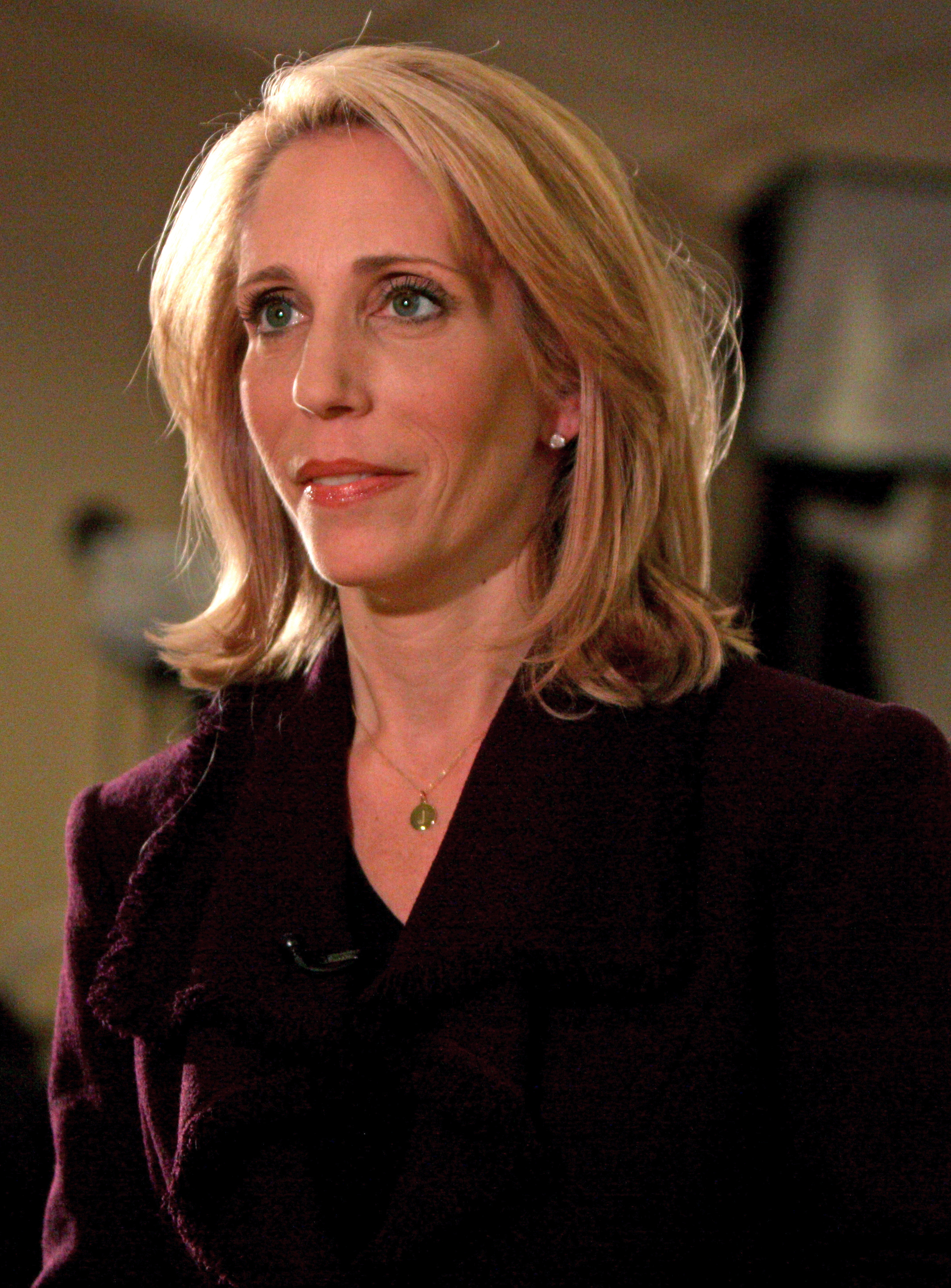
Dana Bash, news anchor; School of Media and Public Affairs

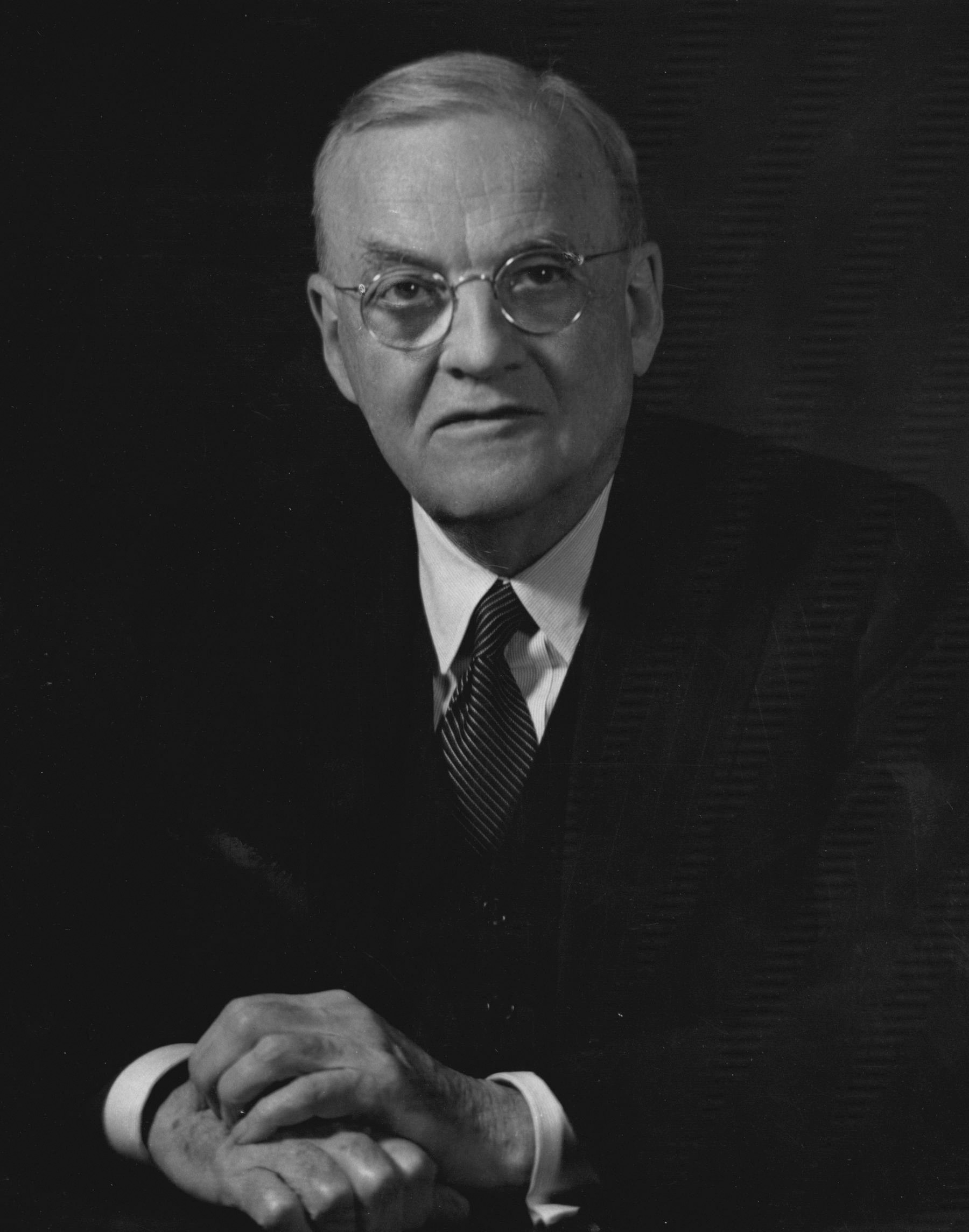
John Foster Dulles, 52nd U.S. Secretary of State; Law School

William Greenleaf Eliot, founder of Washington University in St. Louis; Columbian College

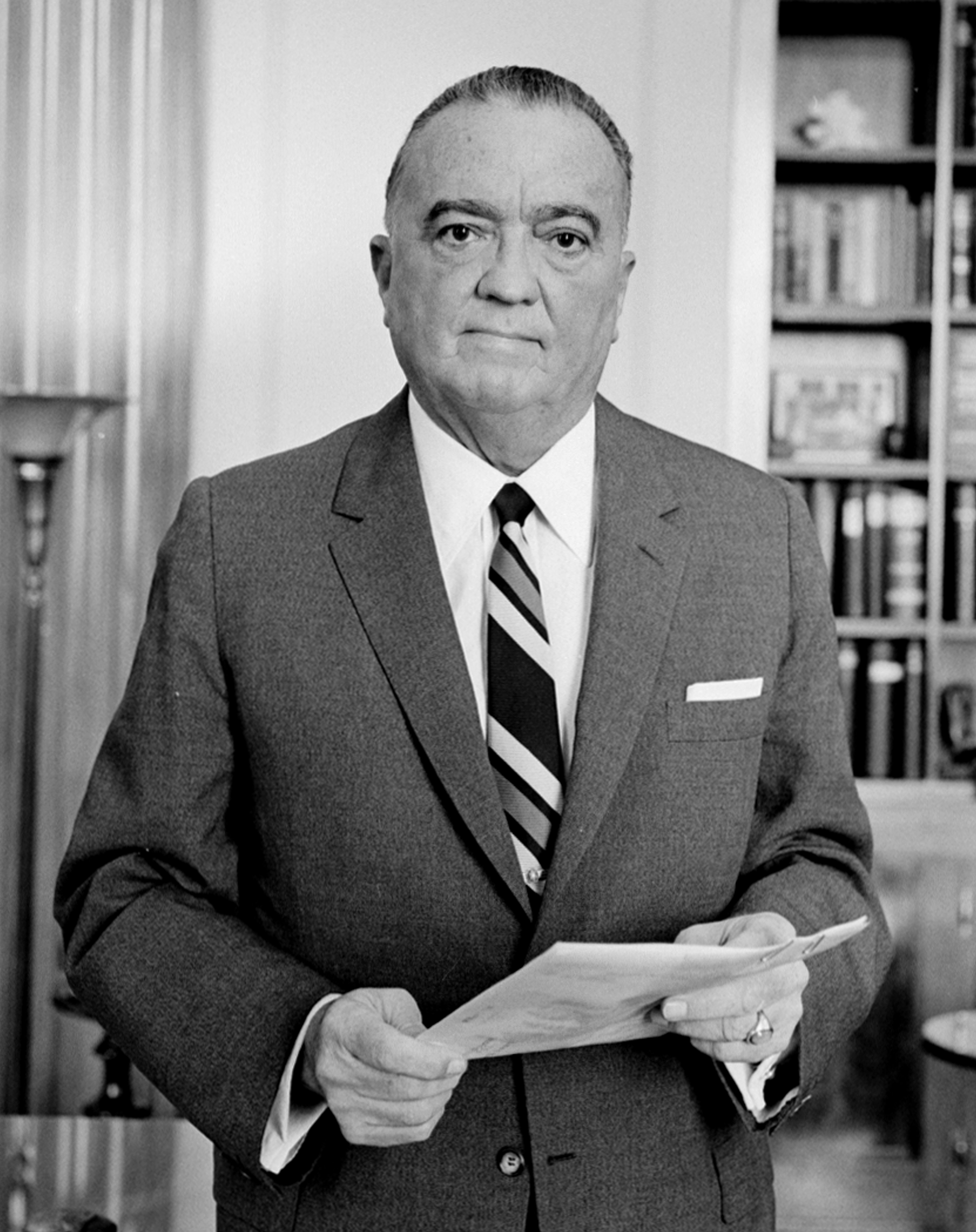
J. Edgar Hoover, first FBI Director; Law School

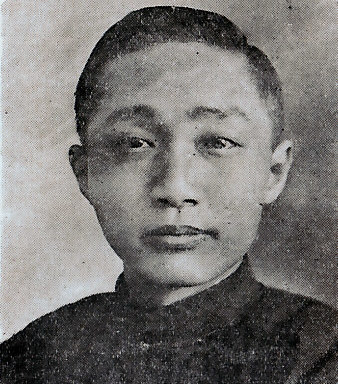
Hsu Mo, founding judge of the International Court of Justice; Law School

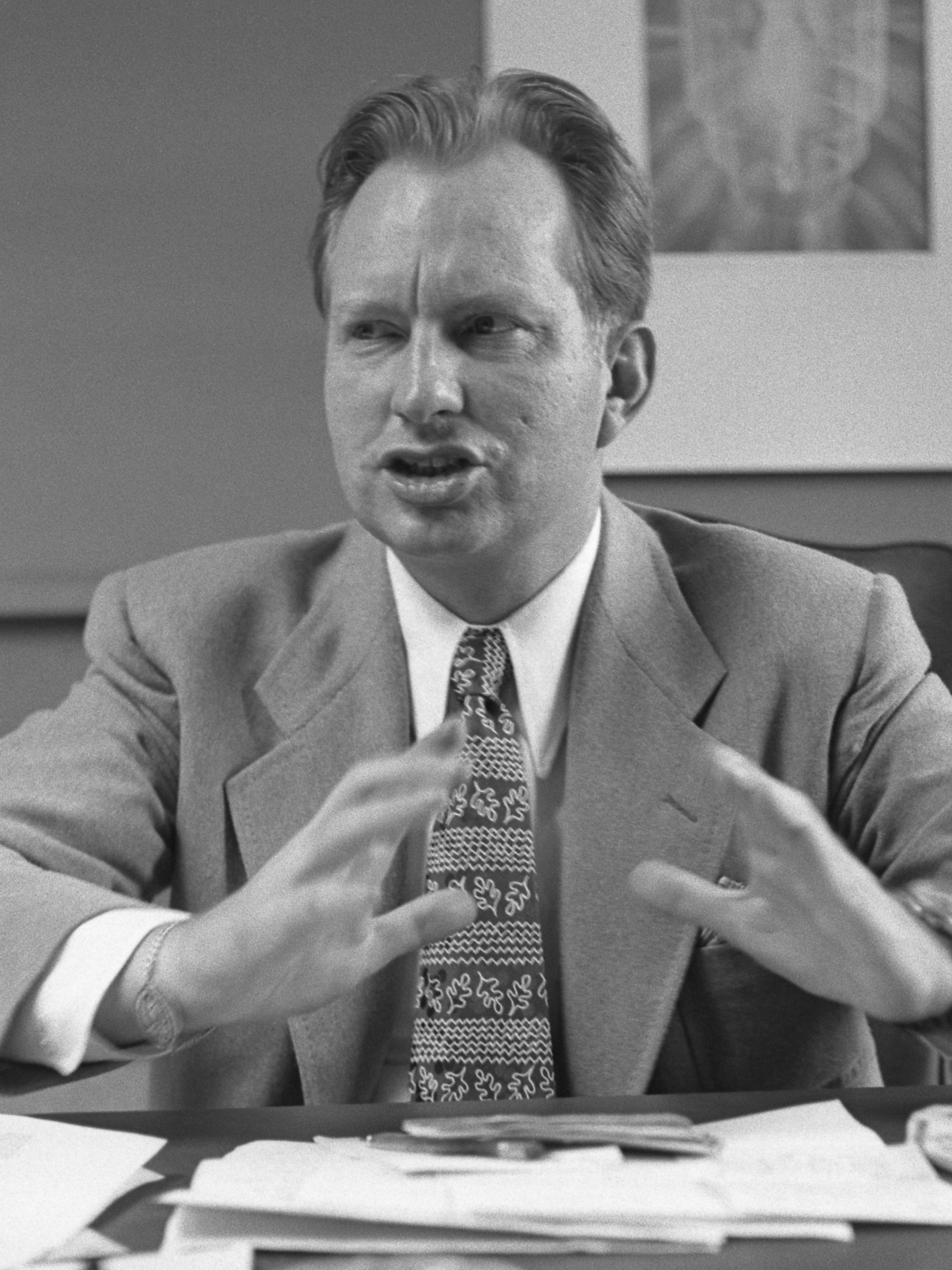
L. Ron Hubbard, Church of Scientology founder; Columbian College

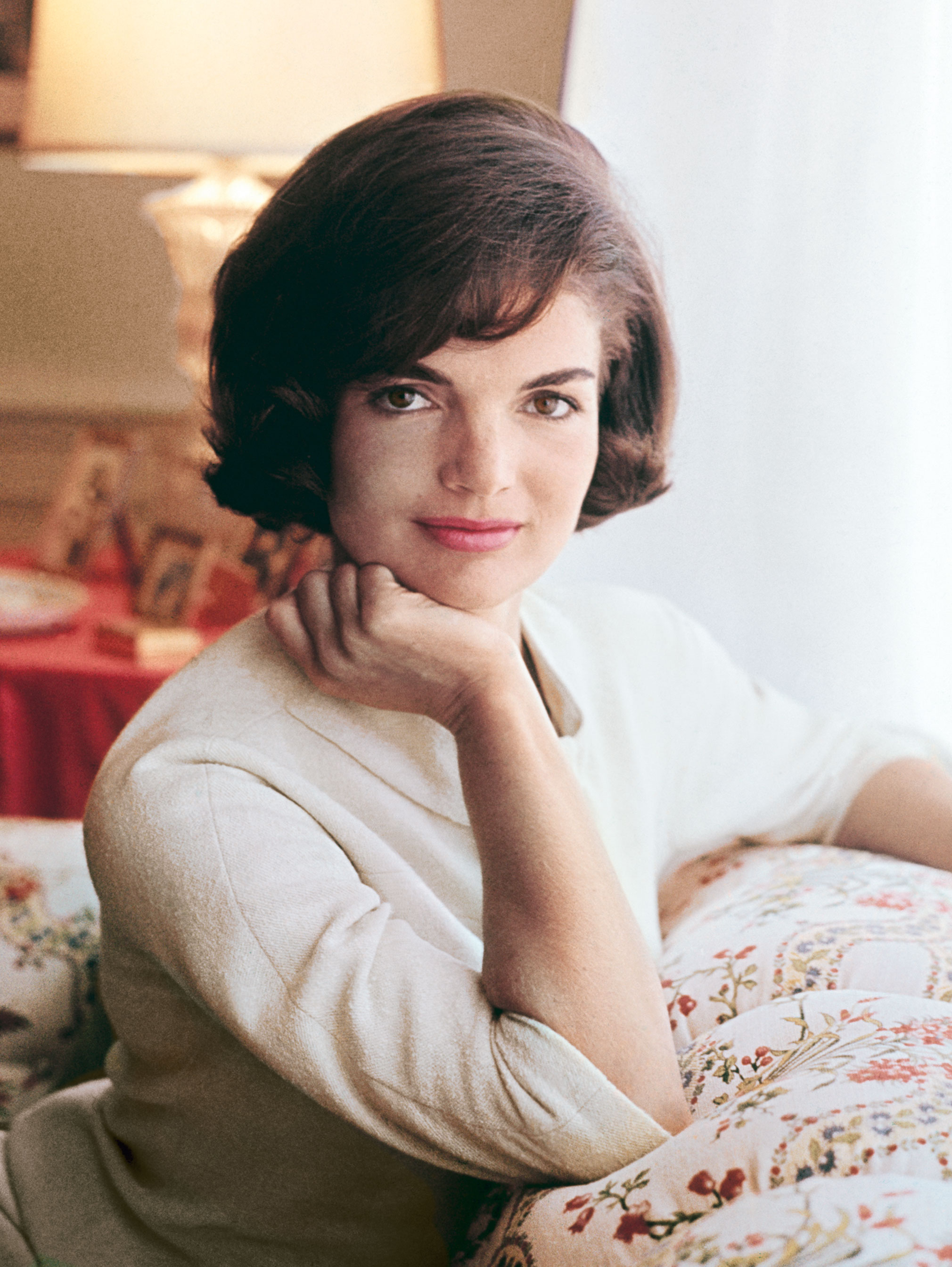
Jacqueline Kennedy Onassis, First Lady of the United States; Columbian College

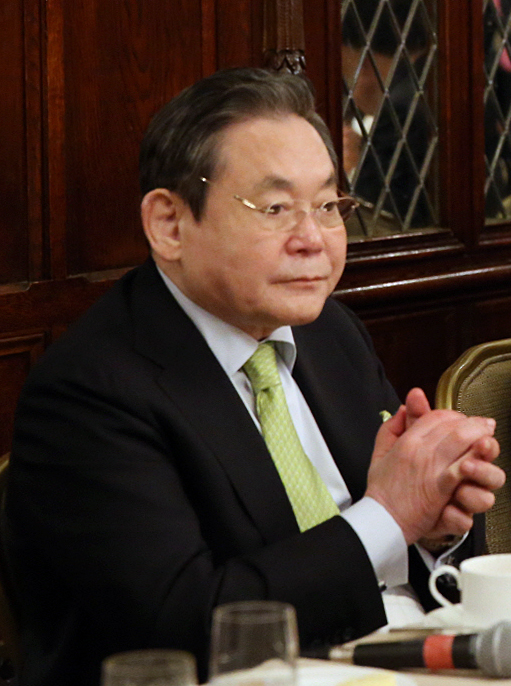
Lee Kun-hee, chairman of Samsung and one of the world's richest people; School of Business

Charles Henry Lauchheimer - First Jewish American USMC Brigadier General

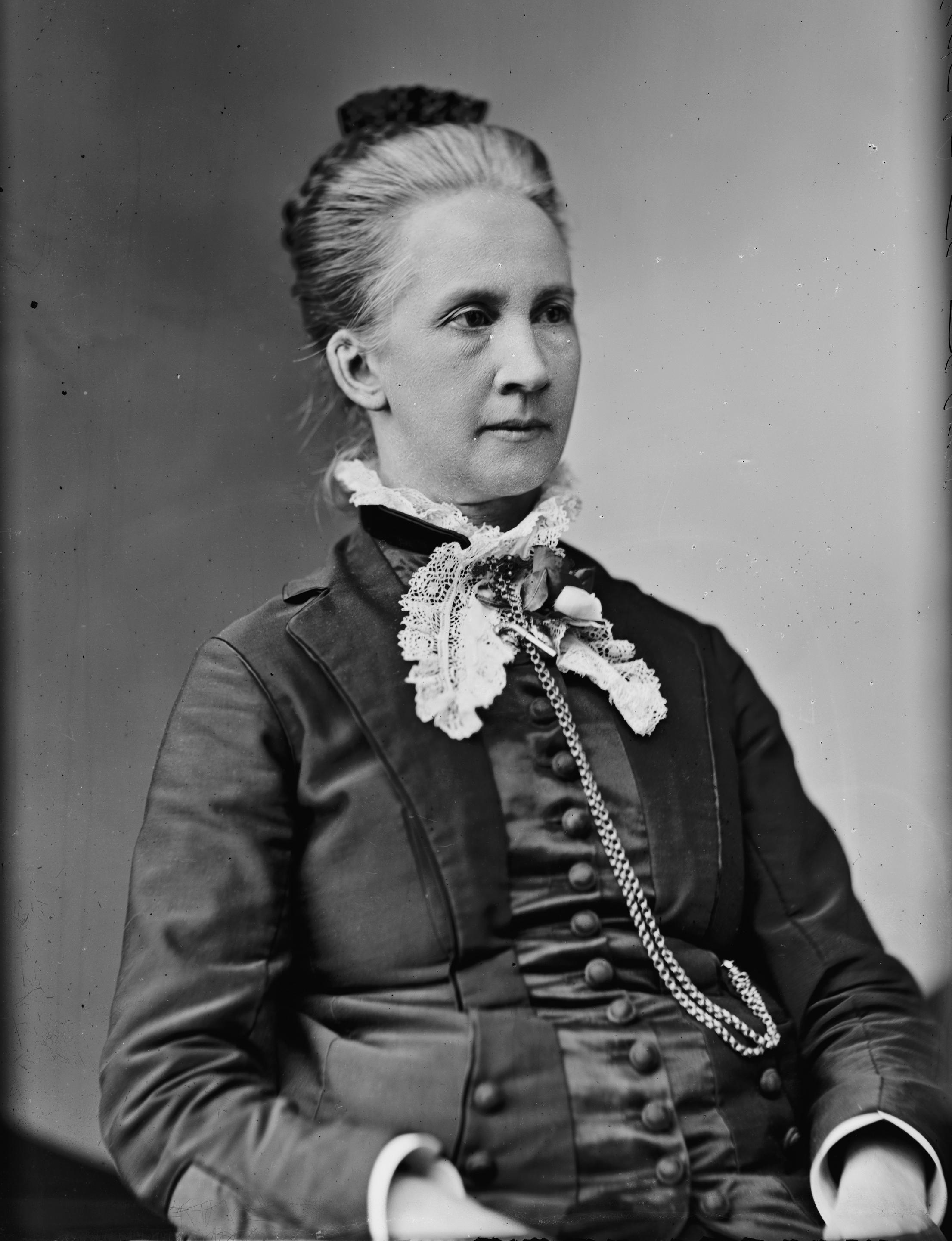
Belva Ann Lockwood, first woman to argue before the U.S. Supreme Court; Law School

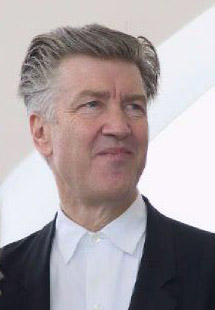
David Lynch, director and artist; Corcoran School

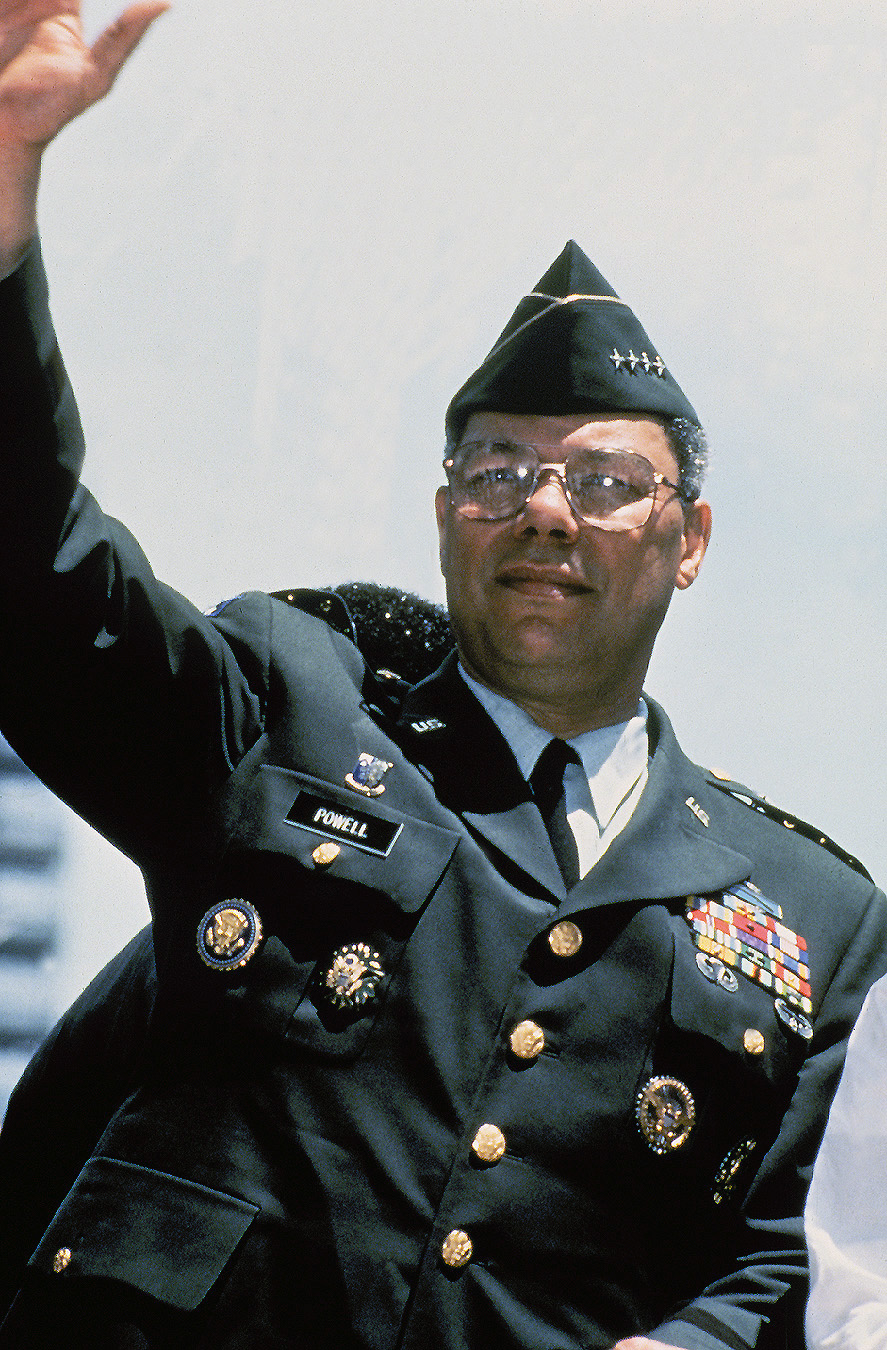
Colin Powell, general and Secretary of State; School of Business

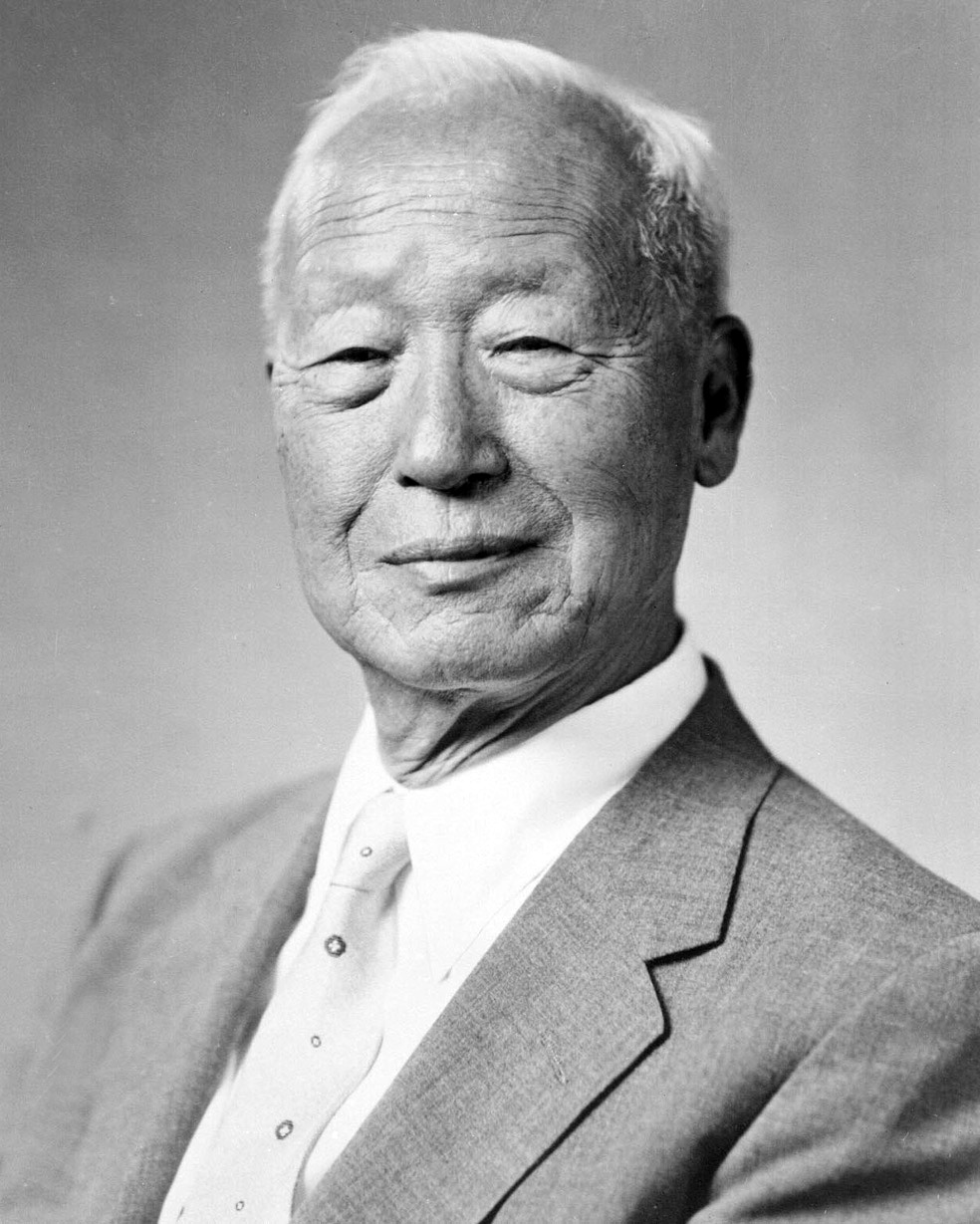
Syngman Rhee, first president of South Korea; Columbian College

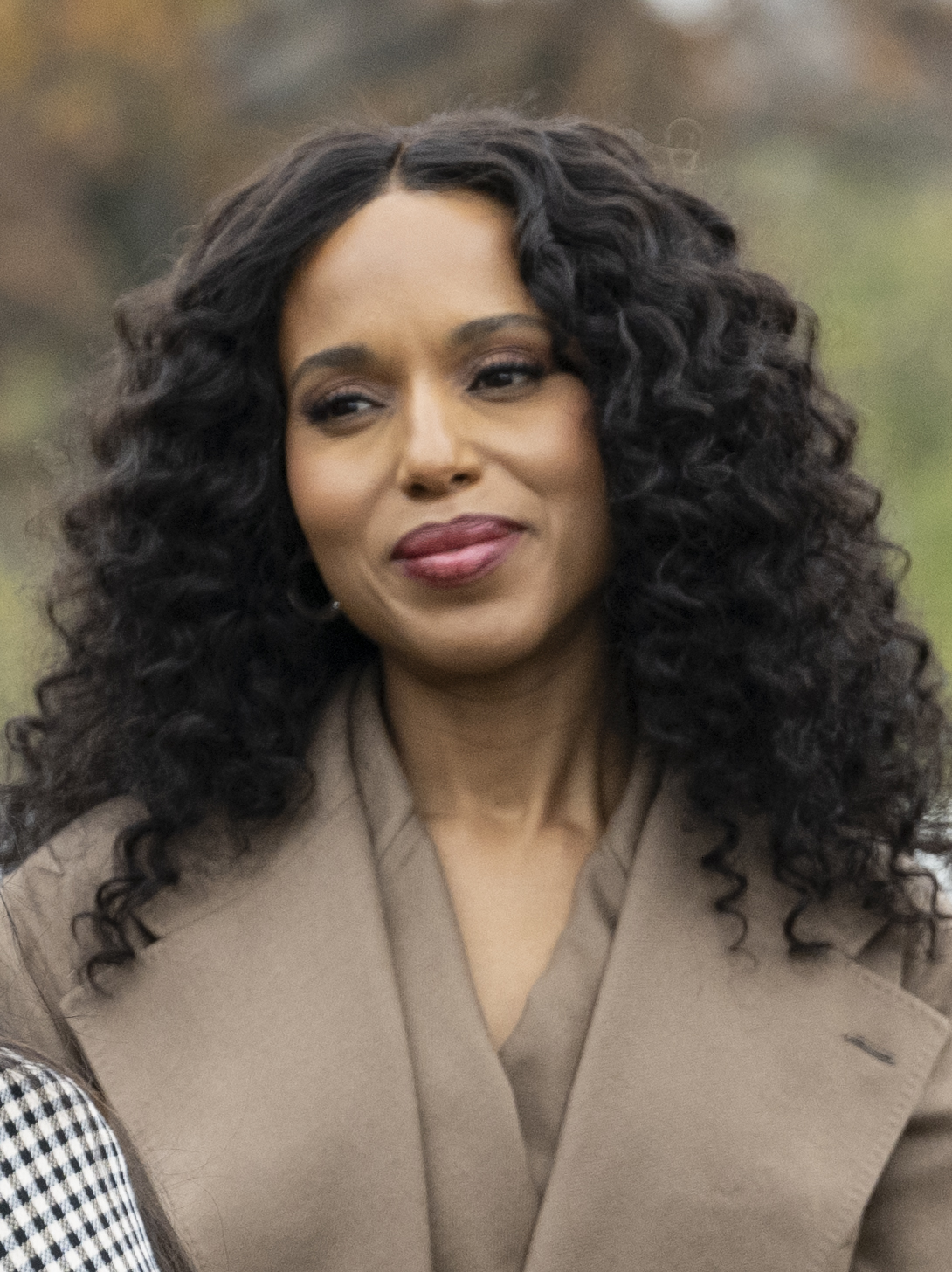
Kerry Washington, actress; Columbian College

Notable alumni, faculty, and affiliates include 16 foreign heads of state or government, 28 United States senators, 27 United States governors, 18 U.S. Cabinet members, five Nobel laureates, two Olympic medalists, two Academy Award winners, and a Golden Globe winner.

Alumni have included many current and past political figures, both in the United States and abroad. 16 GW alumni have served as foreign heads of state or government with four currently serving (as of 2019). Many alumni have held U.S. Cabinet positions, including former Attorney General William Barr, former acting Secretary of Defense Mark Esper, and former Secretary of the Interior David Bernhardt. GW is one of the schools with the most alumni that have served in the U.S. Congress. Notable recent GW alumni members of congress include Harry Reid (Senate Majority Leader for most of the Obama Presidency), Elizabeth Warren (2020 presidential candidate), Eric Cantor (House Majority Leader, 2011–2014), and Robert Byrd (President pro tempore of the Senate under President Bush and President Obama). Alumni have served as governors of 19 U.S. states, as well as the District of Columbia and Guam, among others. Some alumni serving in President Trump's White House include current White House Director of Strategic Communications Mercedes Schlapp and White House Cabinet Secretary Bill McGinley. Other prominent U.S. politicians include Senator J. William Fulbright, former Secretary of State Colin Powell, former FBI Director J. Edgar Hoover, former CIA Director Allen Dulles and his brother, former Secretary of State John Foster Dulles. Also, current Premier of Bermuda Edward David Burt (youngest in history) and current Chief Justice of the Supreme Court of Bhutan Tshering Wangchuk are GW alumni. Former associate director for National Preparedness at the United States Federal Emergency Management Agency (FEMA), John Brinkerhoff was a GW alumni.

In business, Lee Kun-hee (MBA), Chairman of Samsung who is credited with transforming the company into one of the largest electronics manufacturers, Scott Kirby (MS), CEO of United Airlines, Kathy J. Warden (MBA), President and CEO of Northrop Grumman and John F.W. Rogers (BA), Executive Vice President, Chief of Staff and Secretary to the Board of Goldman Sachs. Notable company founders include Robert A. Altman (JD), co-founder of ZeniMax Media, Elaine Wynn, co-founder of Wynn Resorts, and Tom Cortese, co-founder of Peloton.

Science and technology alumni include Julius Axelrod (PhD), Nobel Laureate and medical researcher, Ralph Asher Alpher, National Medal of Science laureate, physicist and "father" of the Big Bang theory, Jack Edmonds, noted computer scientist and mathematician and one of the creators of combinatorial optimization, Walter O. Snelling, who first identified propane and researched how propane could be liquefied and used as a viable energy resource, Charles Browne Fleet, inventor of ChapStick. In addition, 7 NASA astronauts are alumni, including Charles Camarda and Serena Auñón-Chancellor.

In arts, entertainment and media, writer and filmmaker William Peter Blatty (MA), author of The Exorcist, which he adapted for the screen and won the Academy Award for Best Adapted Screenplay. Emmy-winning actors Alec Baldwin and Kerry Washington are also alumni, while filmmaker and Palme d'Or recipient David Lynch, Oscar-winning actor Jared Leto attended the Corcoran School of the Arts and Design. Journalism alumni include Pulitzer Prize winner Glenn Greenwald, CNN commentators Dana Bash and Chuck Todd, as well as NBC News reporter Kasie Hunt. Another notable alumnus in this field is talk radio host Clay Travis.

Leaders of academic institutions include William Greenleaf Eliot co-founder of Washington University in St. Louis, Derek Bok (AM), president of Harvard University, Scott Cowen (MBA), president of Tulane University, and John T. Wilson, president of the University of Chicago.

In education, community leader and educator Alice West Fleet pursued a PhD in this university.

Well known athletes and sports personnel include Boston Celtics coach Red Auerbach (BA, MA), winner of nine NBA championships as a head coach with an additional seven as a general manager for grand total of 16 NBA championships. Many players have been drafted into the NBA such as Yinka Dare and Yuta Watanabe. Other notable athletes include WNBA star Jonquel Jones, Pro Football Hall of Fame running back Tuffy Leemans, and Olympic medalist Elena Meyers Taylor. Several alumni have owned sports teams including Ted Lerner, owner of the Washington Nationals; Abe Pollin, owner of the Washington Wizards and Washington Capitals; and Jerry Reinsdorf, owner of the Chicago Bulls and the Chicago White Sox.

=== Notable faculty ===
Notable George Washington University faculty include:

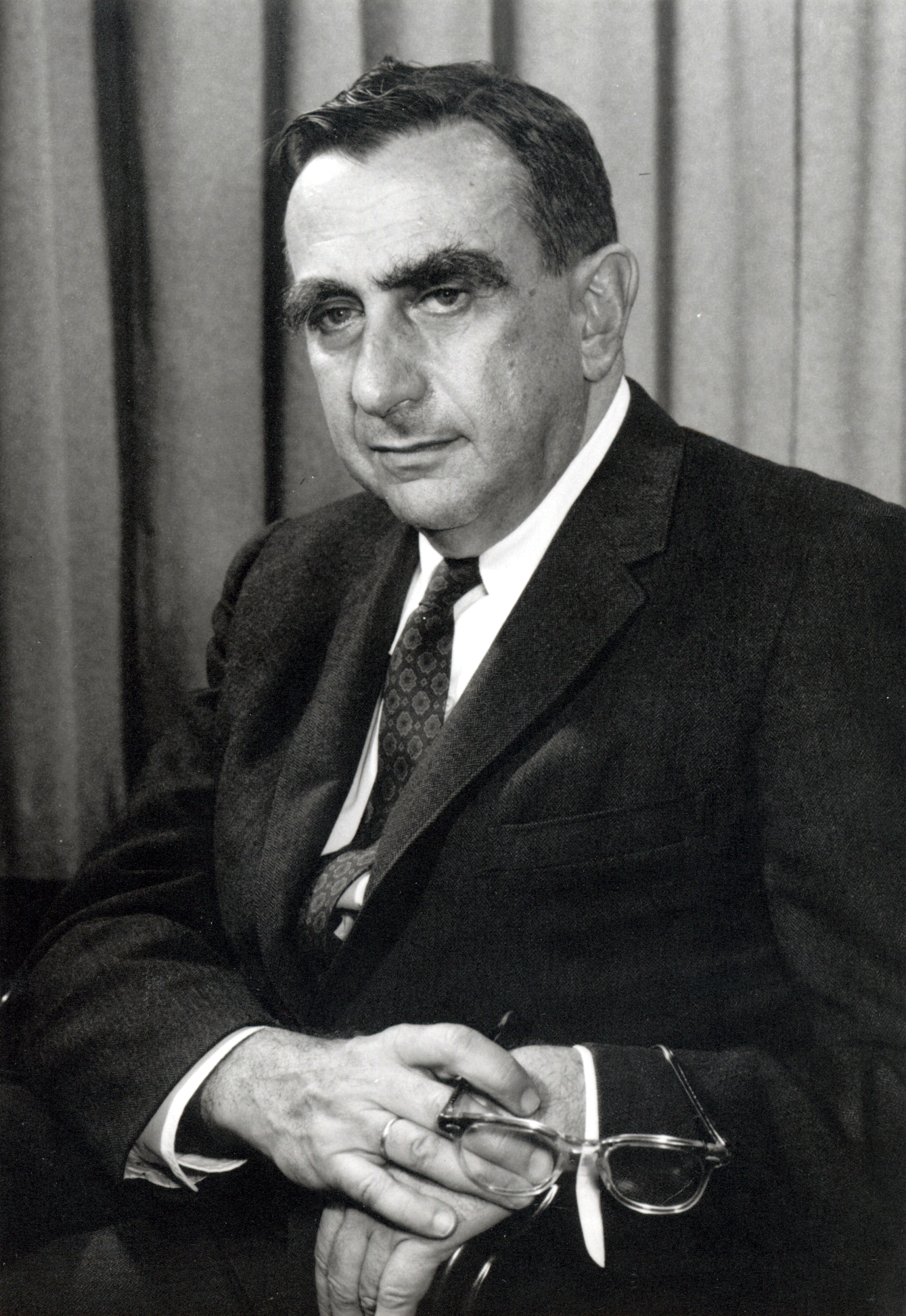
Edward Teller, nuclear physicist known as "the father of the hydrogen bomb"; faculty member

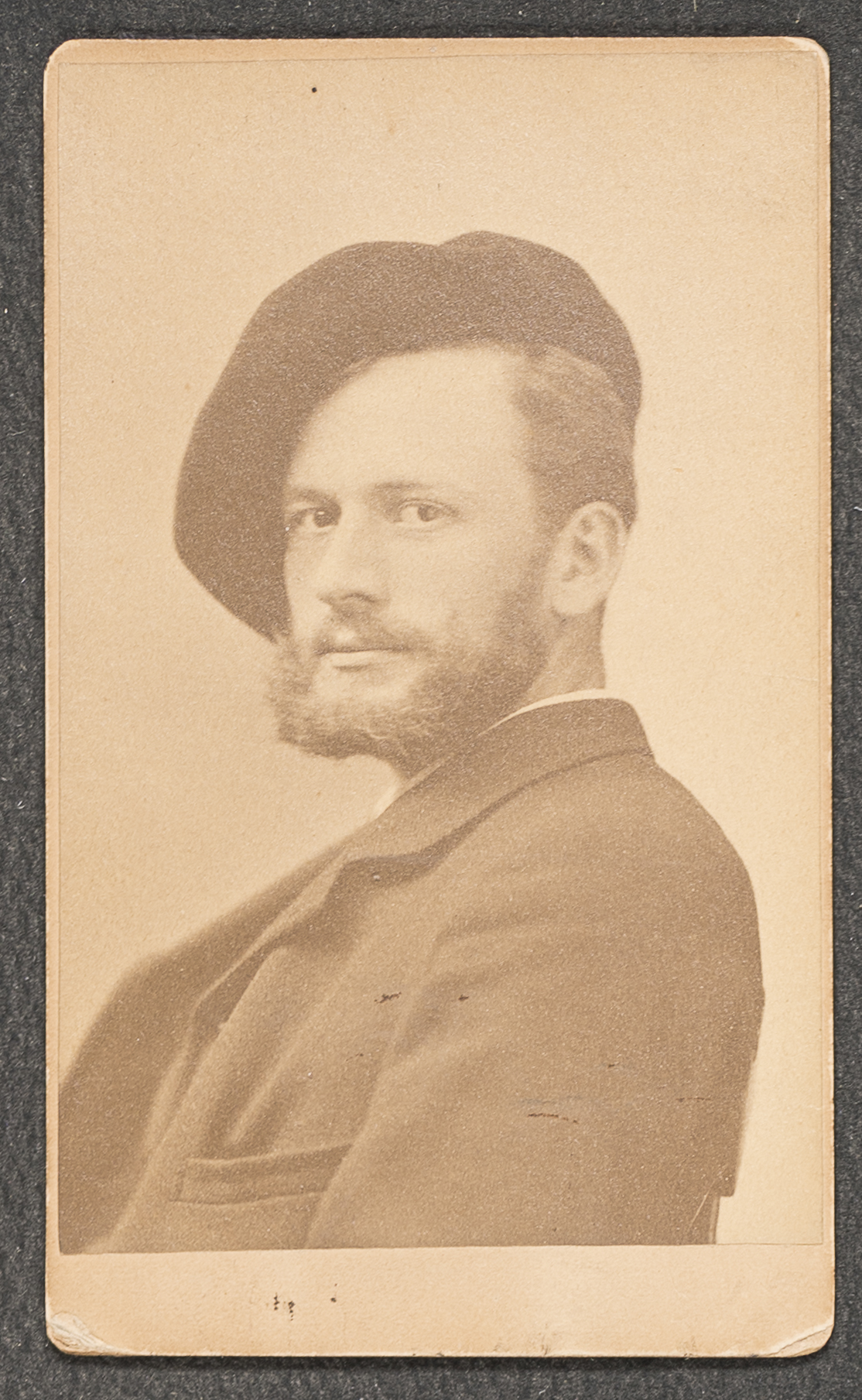
Robert Cutler Hinckley, American portraitist known for portraits of eminent Americans; faculty member

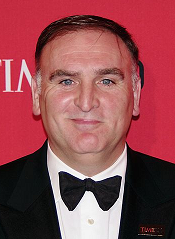
José Andrés, National Humanities Medal winning chef; faculty member

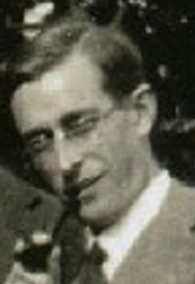
George Gamow, physicist known for Big Bang Theory; faculty member

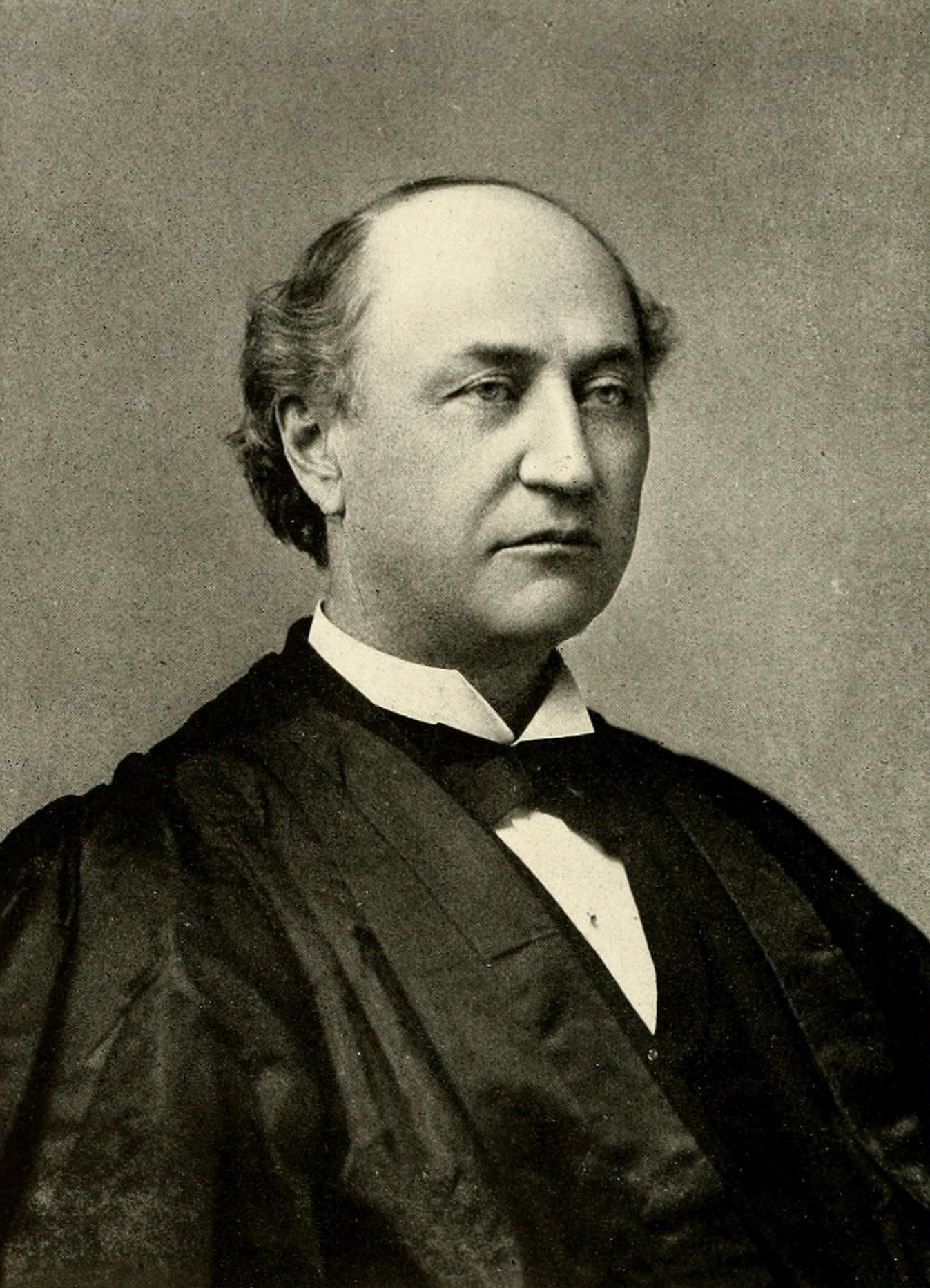
David J. Brewer, U.S. Supreme Court Associate Justice; faculty member

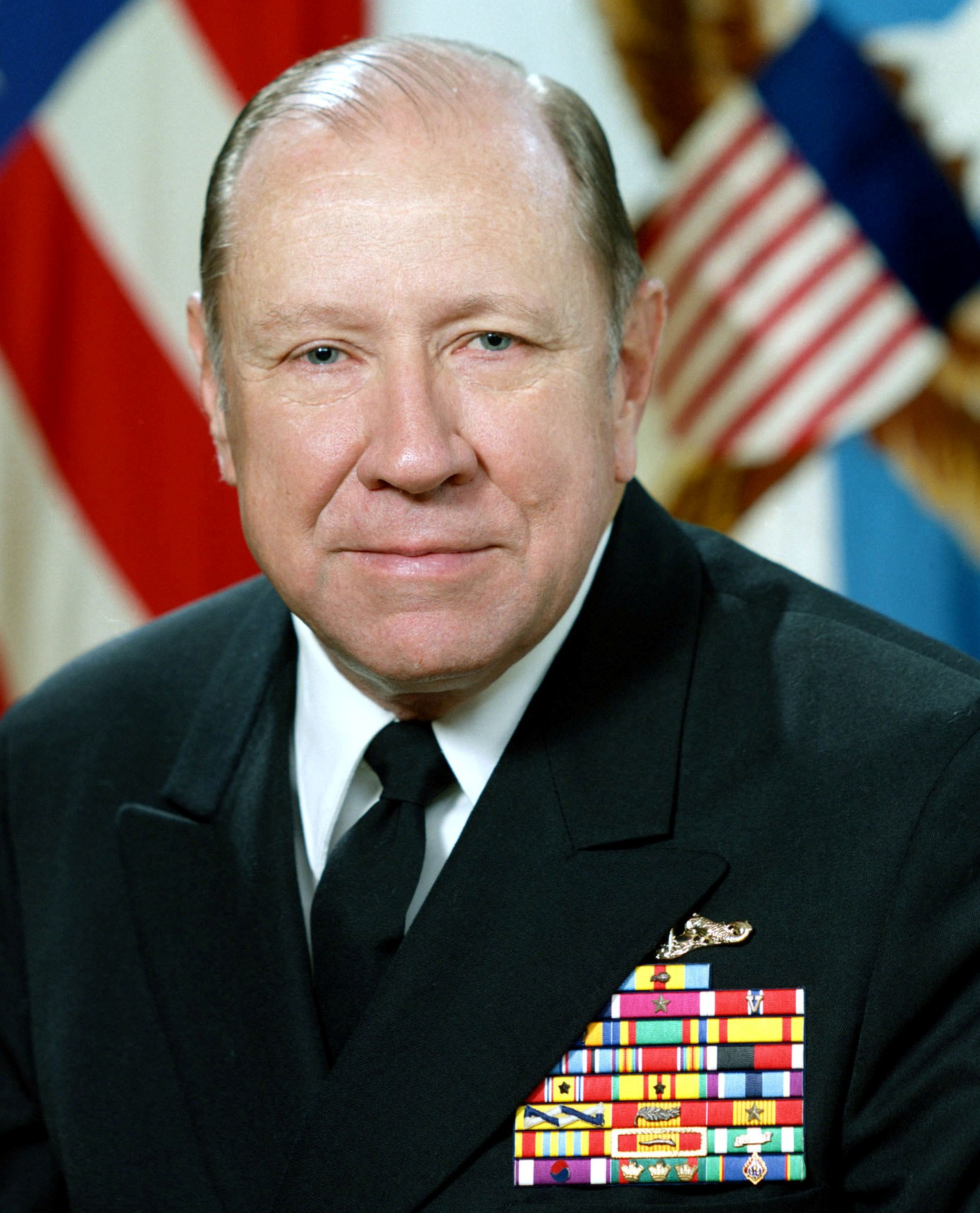
William J. Crowe, Joint Chiefs of Staff Chairman; faculty member

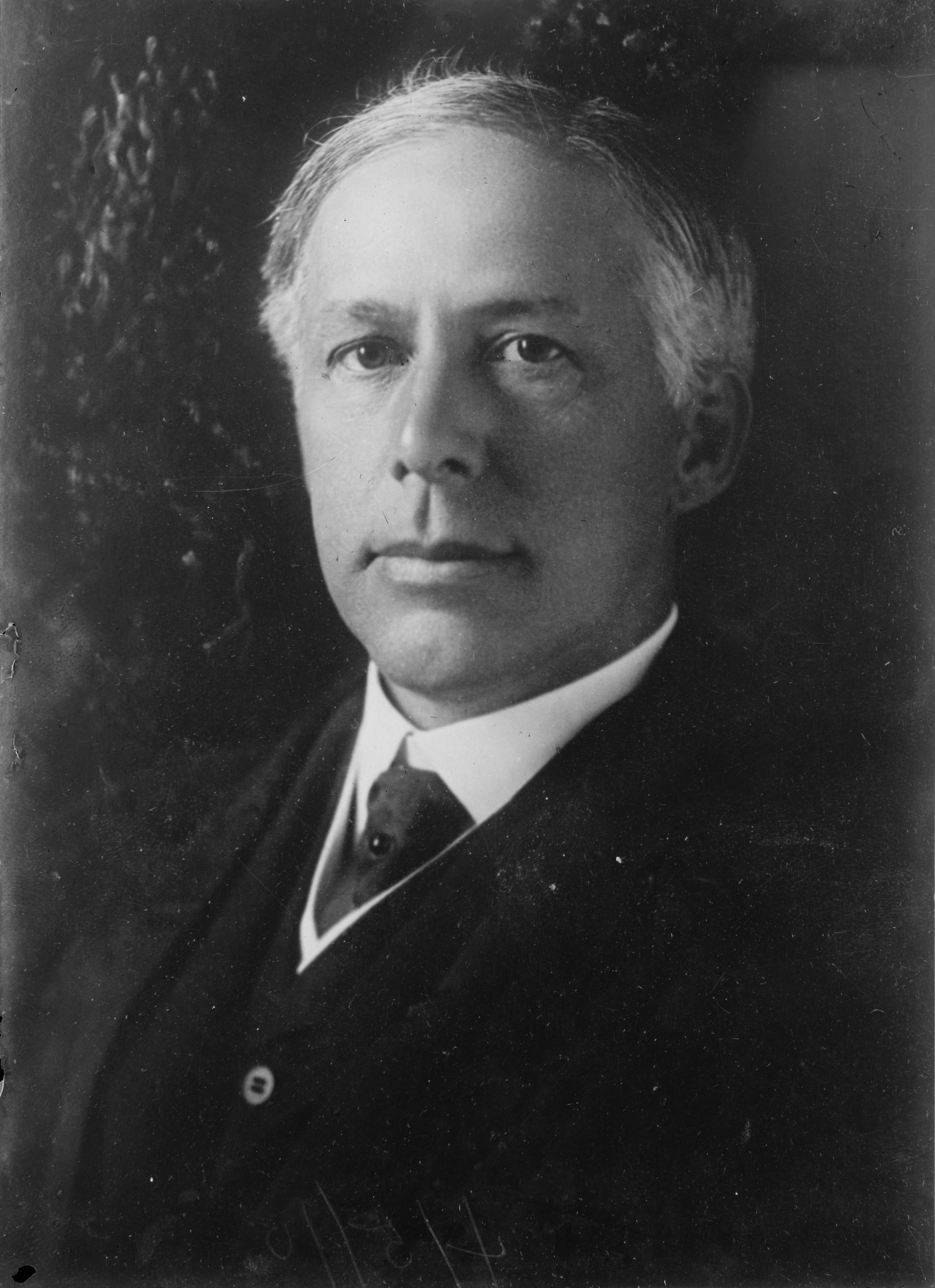
Willis Van Devanter, former U.S. Supreme Court Associate Justice; faculty member

Al Gore, former U.S. vice president and climate activist; faculty member

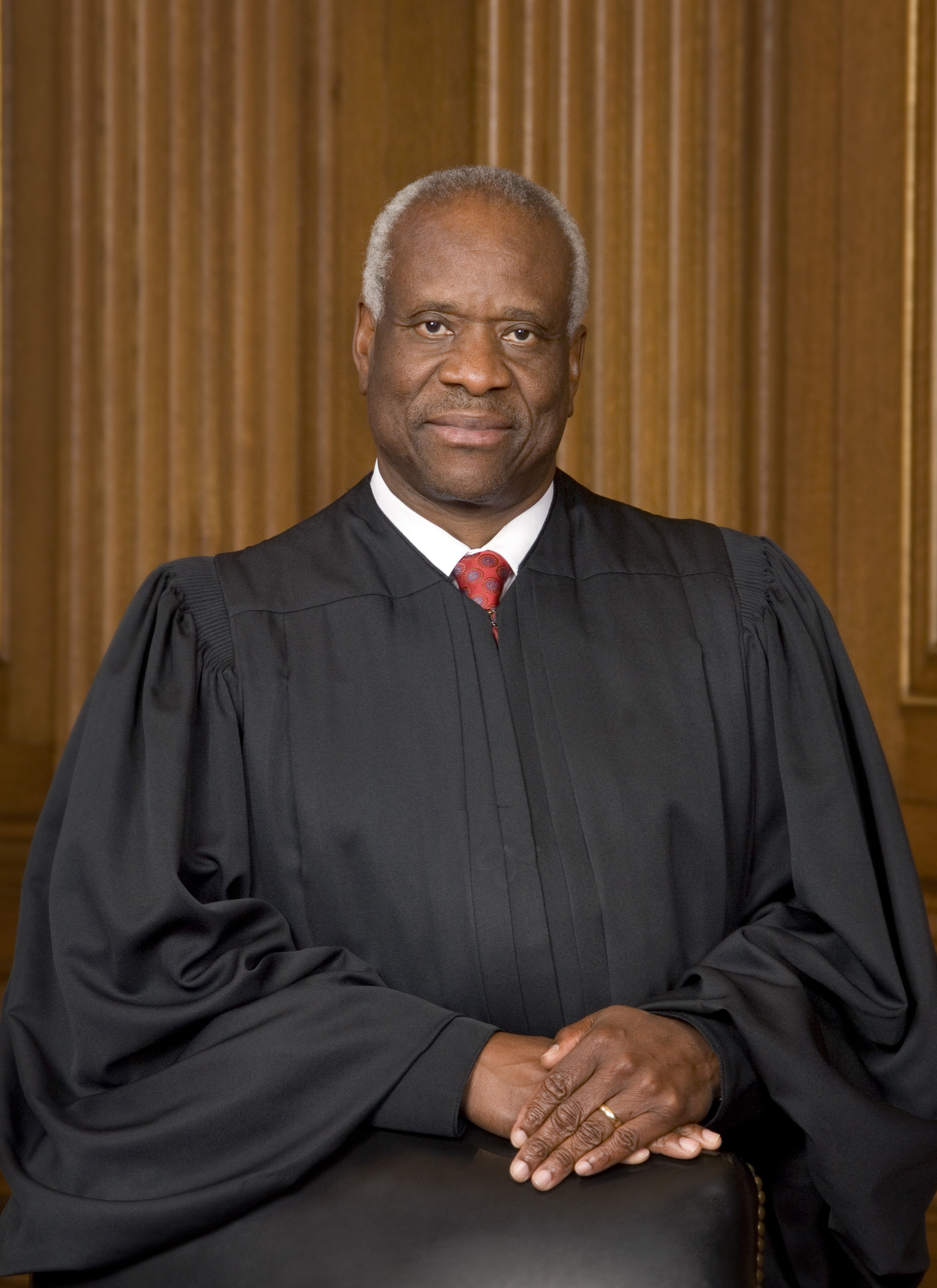
Clarence Thomas, U.S. Supreme Court Justice; Faculty Member

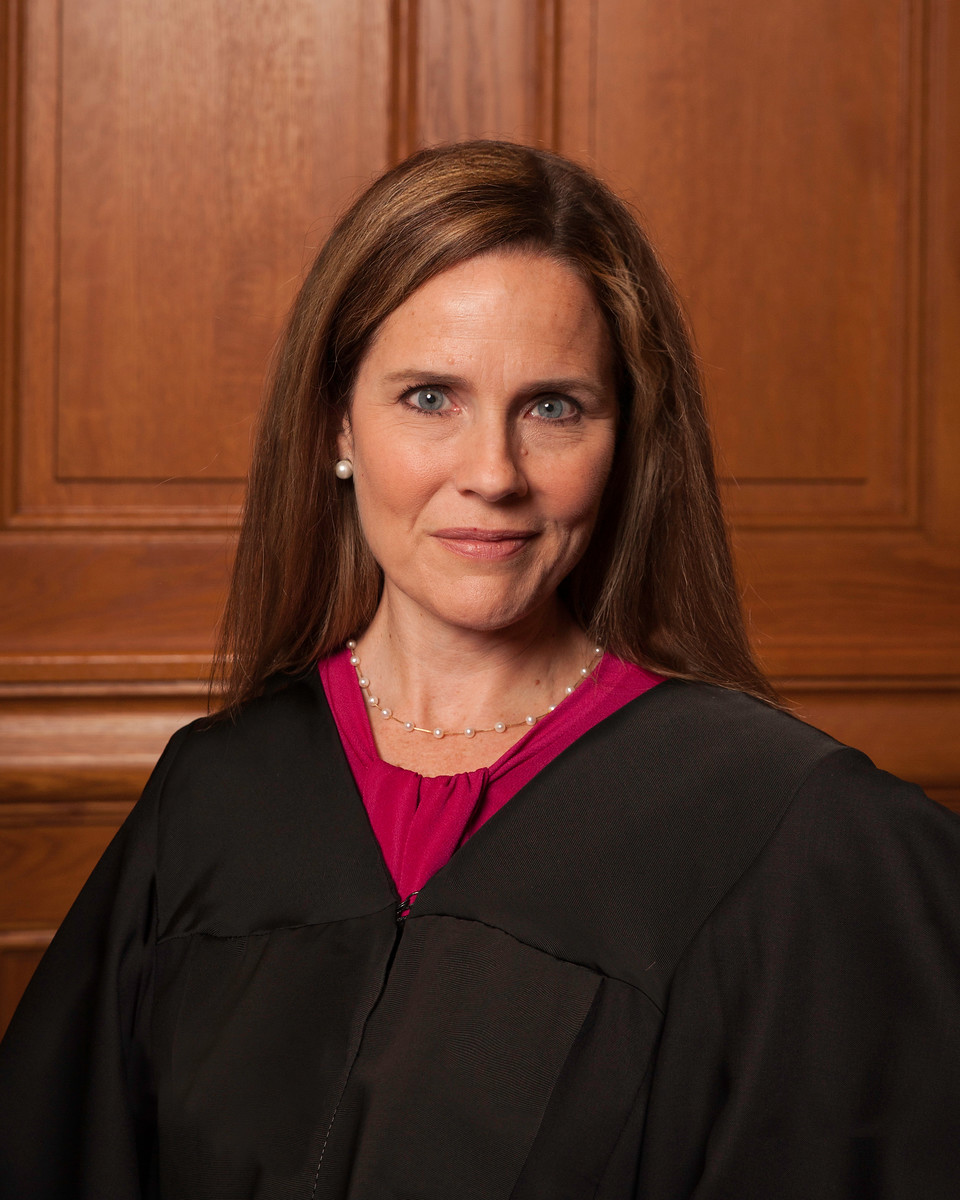
Amy Coney Barrett, U.S. Supreme Court Justice; Faculty Member

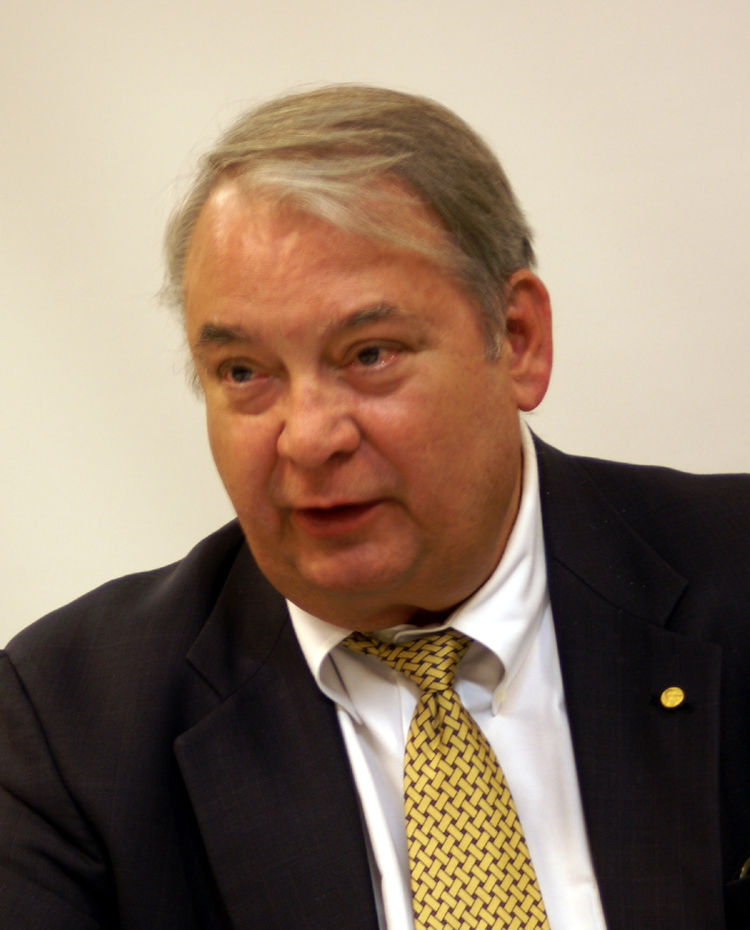
Ferid Murad, winner of Nobel Prize in Medicine; Faculty Member

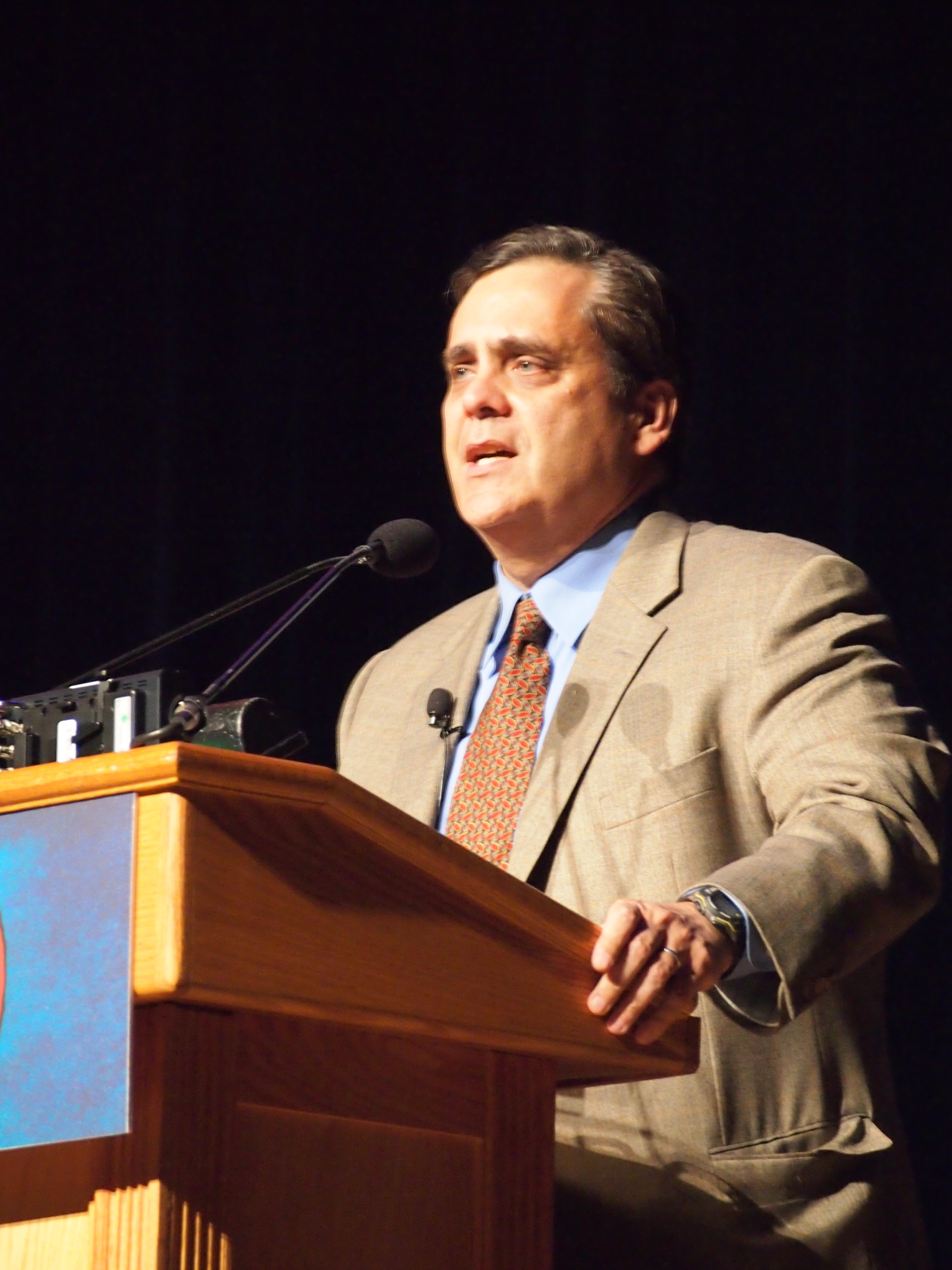
Jonathan Turley, Attorney and Commentator; Shapiro Chair of Public Interest Law

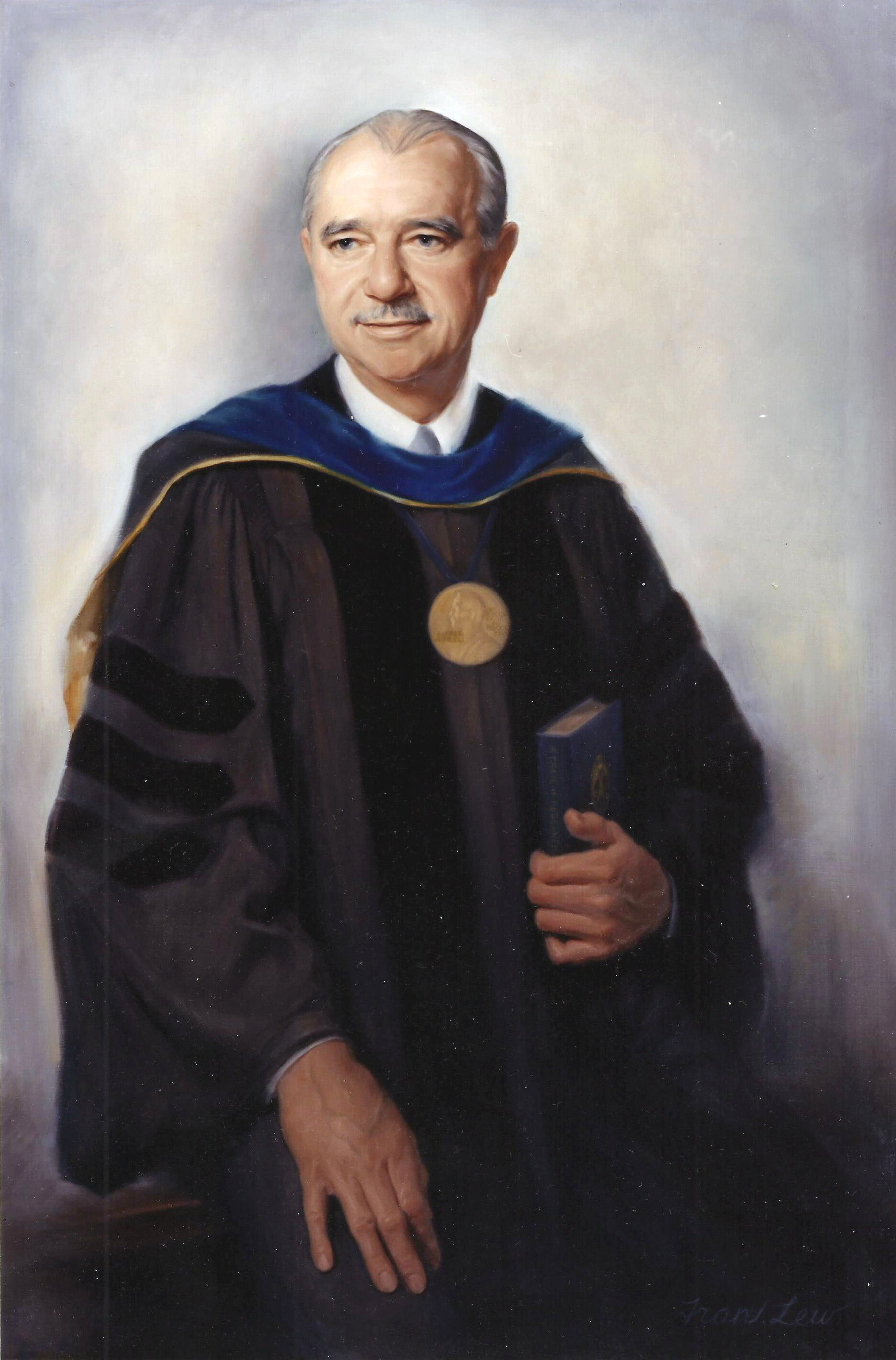
Vincent du Vigneaud, American biochemist and Nobel Laureate; Faculty Member

Notable GW faculty include Tom Perez, former Chair of the Democratic National Committee; two current Supreme Court Justices, Clarence Thomas and Ketanji Brown Jackson; George Gamow, developer of the Big Bang theory; Edward Teller, "father of the hydrogen bomb"; Vincent du Vigneaud, Nobel Prize in Chemistry winner; John Negroponte, first Director of National Intelligence; Thomas Buergenthal, former President of the Inter-American Court of Human Rights; Masatoshi Koshiba, Nobel Prize in Physics winner; Scott Pace, current Executive Secretary of the National Space Council; Amitai Etzioni, former President of the American Sociological Association; Marshall Warren Nirenberg, Nobel Prize in Medicine winner; Edward P. Jones, Pulitzer Prize winner; Abba Eban, former Vice President of the United Nations General Assembly; Dana Perino, former White House Press Secretary; and Ferid Murad, Nobel Prize in Medicine winner.

Other faculty have included Frank Sesno, CNN former Washington, D.C. Bureau Chief and Special Correspondent; James Carafano, Heritage Foundation national security and homeland security expert; Leon Fuerth, former national security adviser to Vice President Al Gore; James Rosenau, political theorist and former president of the International Studies Association; Steven V. Roberts, American journalist, writer and political commentator and former senior writer at U.S. News & World Report; Nancy E. Gary, former dean of Albany Medical College, Executive Vice President of the Uniformed Services University of the Health Sciences and Dean of its F. Edward Hébert School of Medicine, Roy Richard Grinker, anthropologist specializing in autism and North-South Korean relations, Edward P. Jones, who won the Pulitzer Prize for fiction in 2004, novelist Herman "H.G." Carrillo, historian Jessica Krug, Dagmar R. Henney, Dorothy Evans Holmes, psychoanalytic thinker known for her work on racial and cultural trauma, Mohammad Nahavandian (economics), chief of staff of the President of Iran since 2013, and Faure Essozimna Gnassingbé (MBA), president of Togo since 2005, Blake R. Van Leer, president of Georgia Tech, Colonel and Civil Rights advocate. Y. Tony Yang, Endowed Professor of Health Policy and Associate Dean for Health Policy and Population Science.

== See also ==
- 2024 pro-Palestinian protests on university campuses
- Campuses of George Washington University
- GW-TV
- Hail to the Buff and Blue
- List of centers and research institutes at George Washington University
- National Security Archive
- The GW Hatchet
- United States v. Students Challenging Regulatory Agency Procedures
- WRGW
