= List of George Washington University faculty =

Coordinates: 38.900750°N 77.047100°W

The George Washington University
- Motto: Latin: Deus Nobis Fiducia
- Motto in English: God is Our Trust
- Type: Private
- Established: February 9, 1821
- President: Ellen Granberg
- Faculty: 2,663
- Students: 24,531
- Location: Washington, D.C.
- Campus: Urban (Foggy Bottom) Suburban (Mount Vernon and Virginia campuses)
- Colors: Buff and blue
- Website: www.gwu.edu

This is a list of notable George Washington University faculty, including both current and past faculty at the Washington, D.C. school, as well as university officials. As of 2007, George Washington University employs approximately 1,130 full-time, in addition to part-time, faculty members across its three campuses. Presidents John Quincy Adams and Ulysses Grant served on the board of trustees. Professors have been government officials, leading scientists, and others. Edward Teller, a physicist considered the father of the hydrogen bomb, taught at GW. Frank Sesno, a CNN Special Correspondent, currently teaches in that field and, from 2009 to 2020, was the director of the School of Media and Public Affairs. The current president of the university is Ellen Granberg.

== Current faculty ==
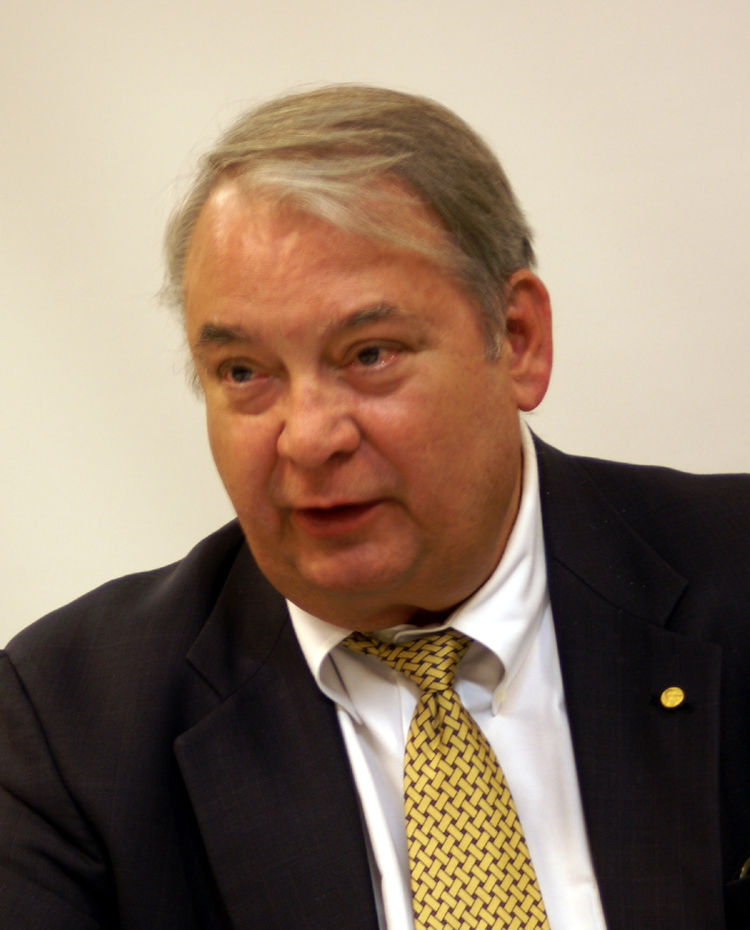
Nobel Prize in Medicine winner Ferid Murad has been a professor in the GW School of Medicine since 2011.

=== Business ===
- Herman Aguinis – Avram Tucker Distinguished Scholar and Professor of Management, and Past President of the Academy of Management
- Hossein Askari – professor of international business
- Annamaria Lusardi – university professor of economics & accountancy
- Stuart Umpleby – professor emeritus in the Department of Management
- Sandiaga Uno – Distinguished Research Professor in Residence in the School of Business, Deputy Governor of Jakarta
- Shaista Khilji – founding editor-in-chief of the South Asia Journal of Business Studies
- Joseph Pelzman – professor of economics and author of the 2025 Donald Trump Gaza Strip takeover proposal
- Anthony Yezer – professor of economics
- Otaviano Canuto – former vice president and executive director at the World Bank
- Stephen C. Smith – professor of economics and international affairs
- Graciela Kaminsky – professor of economics
- James Foster – board member for the World Bank

=== Humanities ===
- Peter Caws – professor of philosophy
- Seyyed Hossein Nasr – founder and first president of the Imperial Iranian Academy of Philosophy, scholar of comparative religion
- Jane Shore – poet
- Alison S. Brooks – professor of anthropology
- Michael J. Marquardt – senior advisor for United Nations Staff College and president of the World Institute for Action Learning
- Eric H. Cline – professor of archaeology
- Marie Price – professor of geography and the first female president of the American Geographical Society
- Bernard Wood – professor of human origins and author of proposal of Homo rudolfensis
- Roy Richard Grinker – editor-in-chief of Anthropological Quarterly
Selected faculty

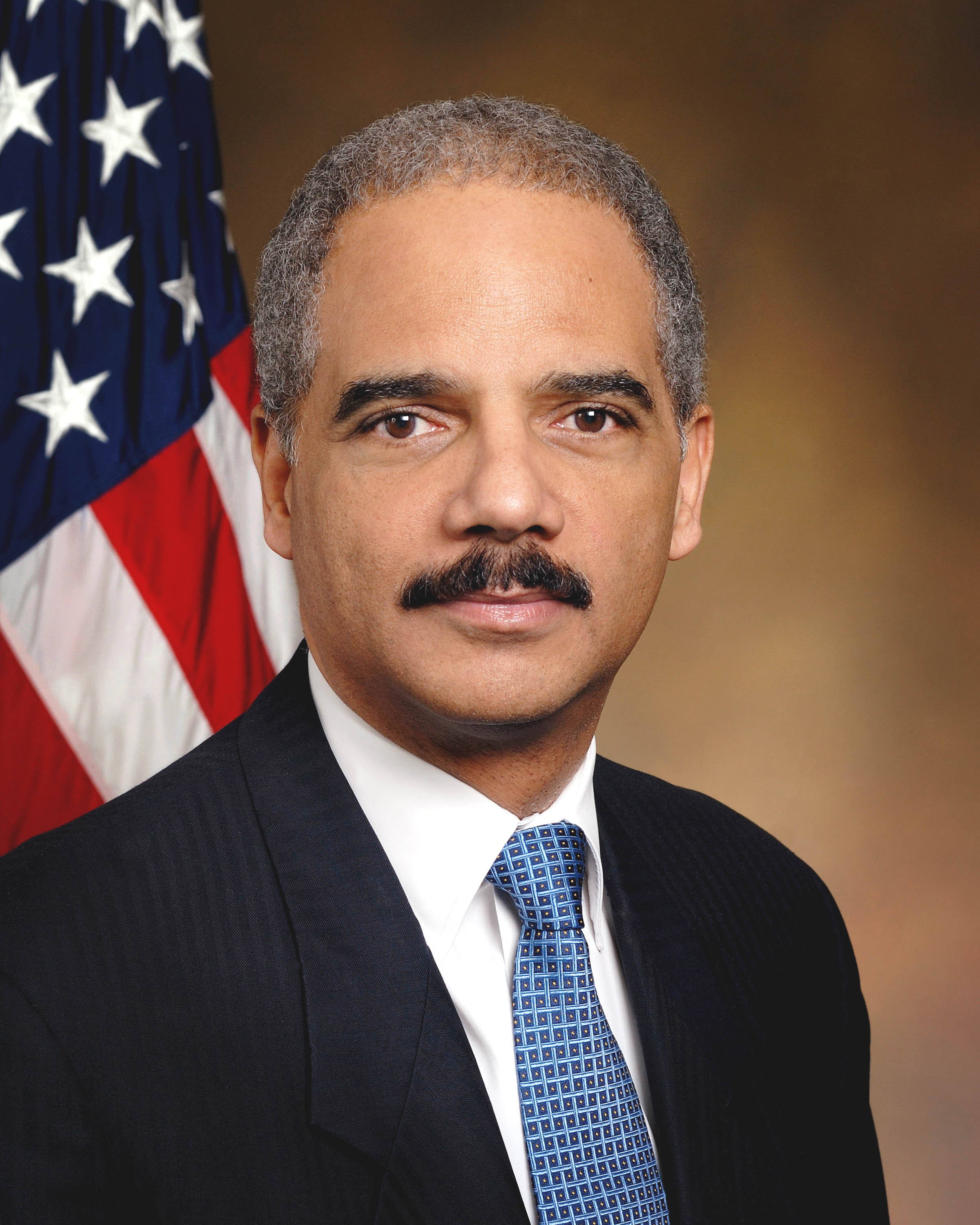
United States Attorney General Eric Holder served on the Board of Trustees.

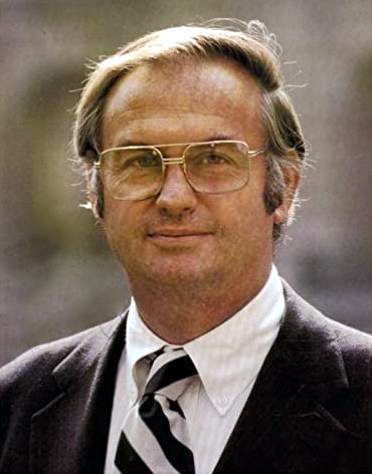
Senator Lowell P. Weicker Jr. is a former law professor.

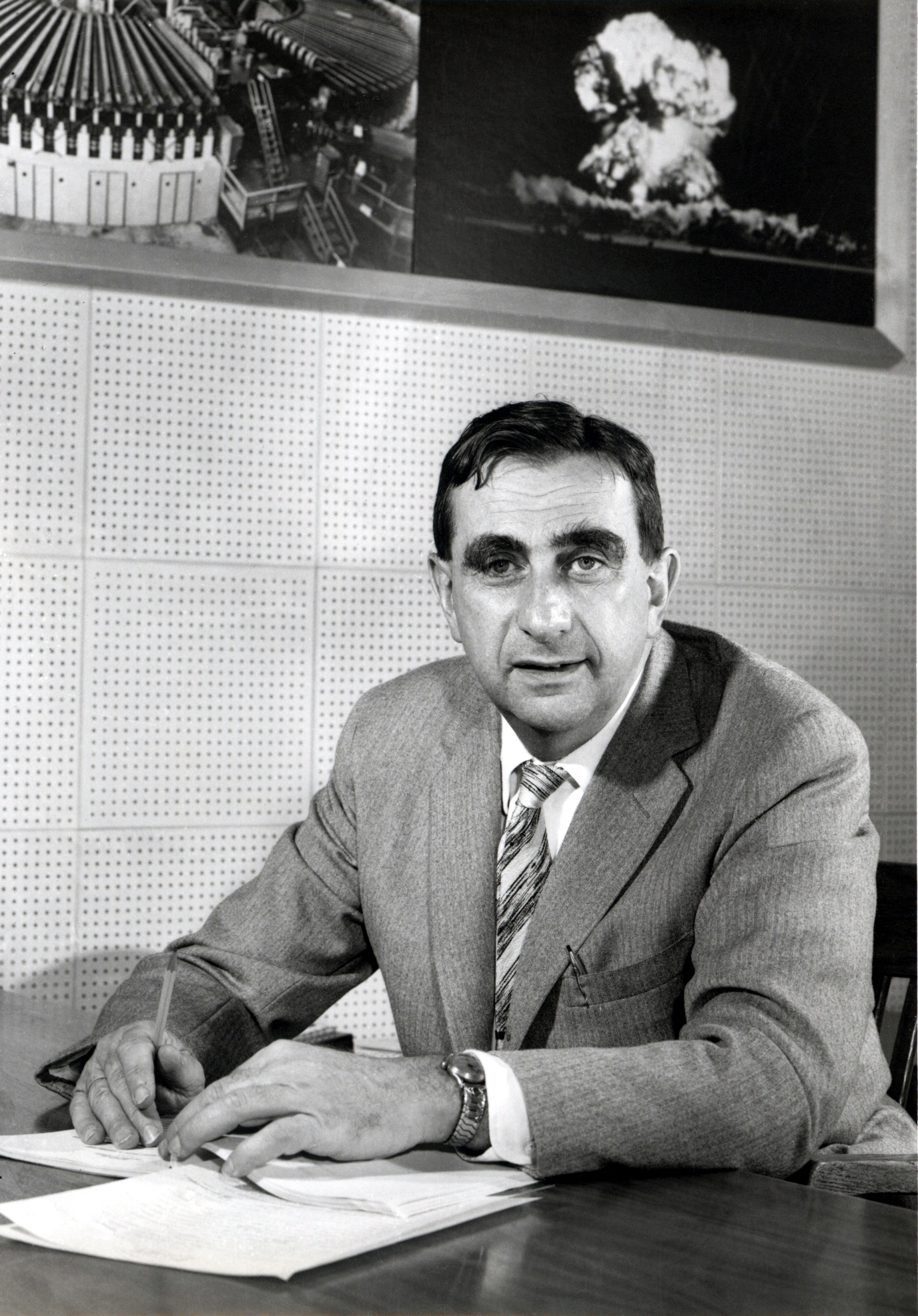
A nuclear physicist, Edward Teller was the father of the hydrogen bomb.

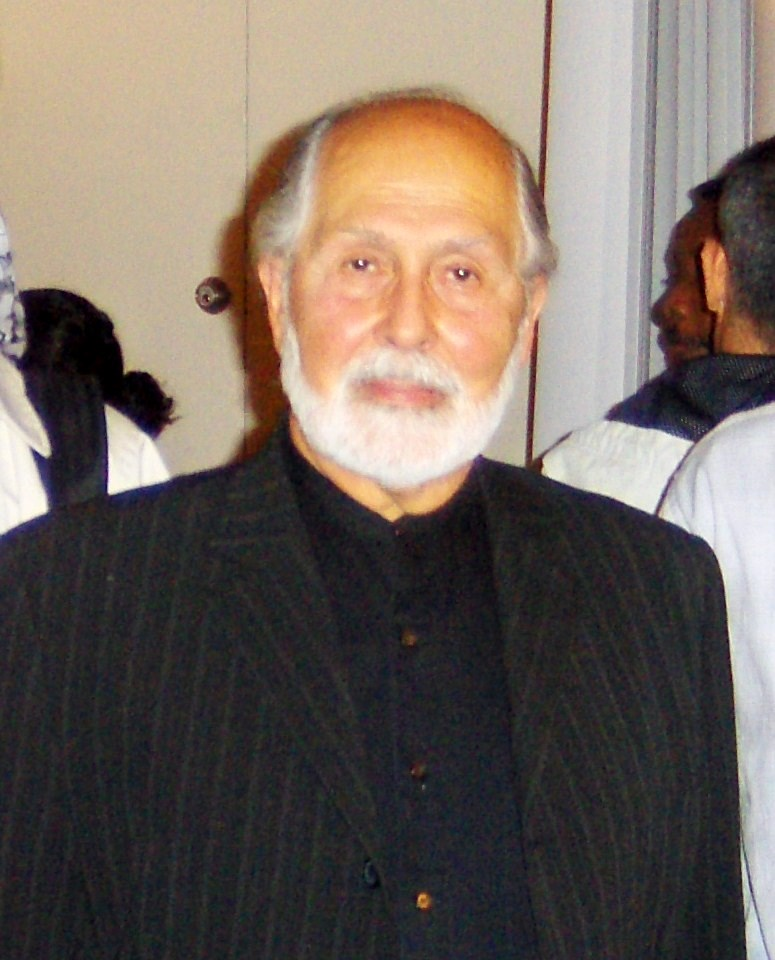
Hossein Nasr, University Professor of Islamic studies, is a leading Iranian Islamic philosopher.

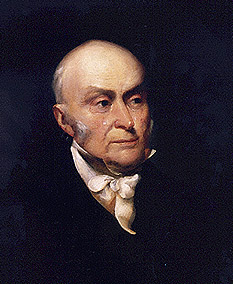
John Quincy Adams, President of the United States, served on the Board of Trustees in 1832.

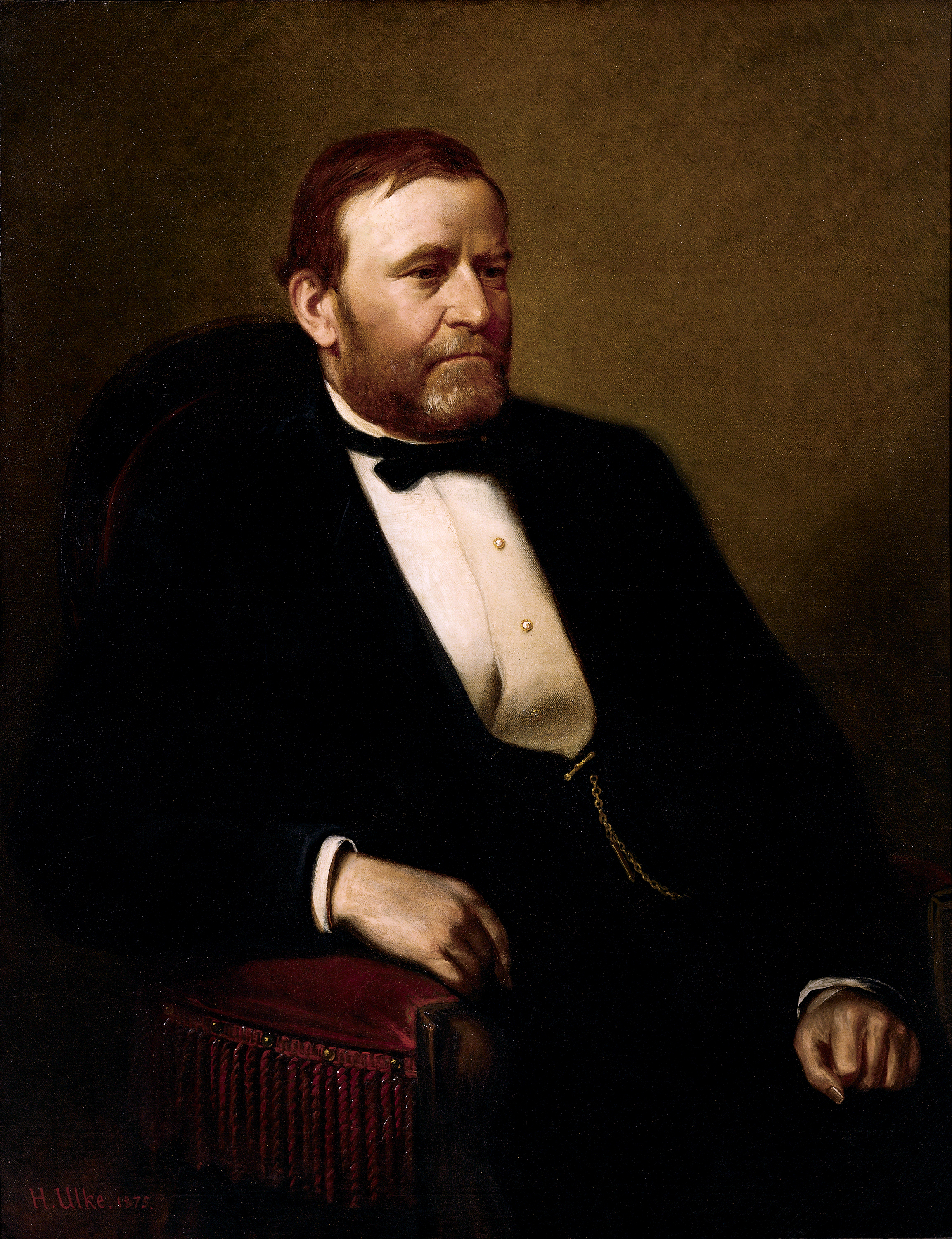
President Ulysses Grant served as an honorary trustee from 1869 to 1877. His grandson was also a trustee.

=== International affairs ===
- Michael Barnett – university professor and leading Constructivist scholar
- Nathan J. Brown – former director of the Institute for Middle East Studies
- Amitai Etzioni – former president of the American Sociological Association
- Martha Finnemore – leader of the constructivist school of international relations theory
- Leon Fuerth – former National Security Adviser to Vice President Al Gore
- Edward "Skip" Gnehm – former U.S. Ambassador to Jordan, Kuwait and Australia
- Karl Inderfurth – former Assistant Secretary of State for South and Central Asian Affairs
- Marc Lynch – director of the Institute for Middle East Studies, coined the term Arab Spring
- Thomas E. McNamara – former Assistant Secretary of State for Political-Military Affairs
- Eric Newsom – former Assistant Secretary of State for Political-Military Affairs
- Scott Pace – director of the Space Policy Institute and former Executive Secretary of the National Space Council during the first Trump Administration
- Lawrence Wilkerson – former Chief of Staff to United States Secretary of State Colin Powell
- Gordon Gray III – former US Ambassador to Tunisia
- Michael E. Brown – former senior fellow at International Institute for Strategic Studies and former co-editor of International Security
- Barry Chiswick – former senior staff economist at the Council of Economic Advisers
- Arie M. Dubnov – professor of Israel studies
- Gerónimo Gutiérrez Fernández – former Mexican Ambassador to the United States
- Charles L. Glaser – professor of political science and international affairs
- James Hershberg – former director of the Cold War International History Project
- Bonnie Jenkins – 18th Under Secretary of State for Arms Control and International Security
- Matthew Levinger – former senior program officer at United States Institute of Peace
- Robert Litwak – former vice president and director of international security studies at Wilson Center and former director for nonproliferation on the National Security Council during the first Clinton Administration
- Cynthia McClintock – member of the Center for International Policy's board of directors and former president of the Latin American Studies Association
- Harris Mylonas – lifetime member of the Council on Foreign Relations and the editor-in-chief for the Nationalities Papers
- John Nagl – former president of the Center for a New American Security
- Henry R. Nau – senior staff member of the National Security Council during the Reagan Administration
- Deepa M. Ollapally – former director of the South Asia program at the United States Institute of Peace
- Walter Reich – Yitzhak Rabin Memorial Professor of International Affairs, Ethics and Human Behavior and former director of the United States Holocaust Memorial Museum
- Nilofar Sakhi – former chief executive and executive director at the American University of Afghanistan
- David Shambaugh – member of the Council on Foreign Relations and United States National Security Council staff during the Carter Administration
- Jay Shambaugh – former Under Secretary of the Treasury for International Affairs during the Biden Administration
- David H. Shinn – diplomat
- Barbara Slavin – former director of the Future of Iran Initiative at the Atlantic Council
- William B. Taylor Jr. – 6th United States ambassador to Ukraine and chargé d'affaires for Ukraine under the Trump administration

=== Journalism and public affairs ===
- Dana Perino – former White House Press Secretary in the George W. Bush Administration
- Steven V. Roberts – journalist, writer, and commentator
- Frank Sesno – CNN correspondent
- Robert Entman – professor of media and public affairs

=== Law ===
- Steve Charnovitz – professor of law, member of the Council on Foreign Relations
- Spencer Overton – professor of law, former U.S. Attorney, top bundler for Barack Obama, member of President-elect Obama's Justice Department Review Team
- Jeffrey Rosen – professor of law, legal editor at The New Republic
- Clarence Thomas – current Associate Justice of the Supreme Court of the United States
- Jonathan Turley – Shapiro Chair for Public Interest Law and frequent guest on news programs

=== Mathematics ===
- John B. Conway – professor of mathematics

=== Medicine ===
- Francois Boller – clinical professor of neurology
- Paul Brindley – Professor of Microbiology, Immunology, and Tropical Medicine
- William DeVries – first surgeon to perform a successful permanent artificial heart implantation
- Vanessa Northington Gamble – University Professor, chaired the Tuskegee Syphilis Study Legacy Committee under then-President Bill Clinton
- Ferid Murad – University Professor, Nobel Laureate
- Richard Restak – clinical professor of neurology
- Ami Zota – associate professor at George Washington University Milken School of Public Health
- Mary Ellsberg – former vice president for research and programs at the International Center for Research on Women

=== Political management ===
- Mark Kennedy – business executive, congressman, presidential appointee, introduced shapeholders to business strategy

=== Public policy and public administration ===
- Edward Berkowitz – historian and presidential adviser
- Kathryn Newcomer – author and academic
- Marcus Raskin – social critic and activist
- Christopher H. Sterling – media historian
- Stephen Joel Trachtenberg – President Emeritus of George Washington University

=== Sciences ===
- Pascale Ehrenfreund – first woman president of the Austrian Science Fund and former president and chancellor of the International Space University
- Lisa Bowleg – professor of applied social psychology
- Christopher Mores – virologist
- Valerie Hu – professor of biochemistry and molecular biology
- David Alan Grier – former president of the Computer Society of the Institute of Electrical and Electronics Engineers

== Past faculty ==
- Moudud Ahmed – former prime minister of Bangladesh
- Ruth Aaronson Bari – mathematician known for her work in graph theory and homomorphisms
- Stephen Biddle – scholar and author on U.S. defense strategy
- Chrystelle Trump Bond – former lecturer of dance, choreographer, dance historian, and author
- David Josiah Brewer – former Associate Justice of the United States Supreme Court
- Letitia Woods Brown (1971–1976) – historian
- Judith Butler – former professor of philosophy
- Thomas Buergenthal – former professor of international and comparative law and jurisprudence, formerly the American judge on the International Court of Justice
- Robert J. Callahan – current ambassador to Nicaragua, former SMPA professor
- Vikram Chandra – author of Sacred Games and winner of the Commonwealth Writers Prize
- Nathaniel C. Comfort – former researcher in the Department of History
- William J. Crowe – former professor of international affairs, Chairman of the Joint Chiefs of Staff, United States Ambassador to the United Kingdom
- Thomas J. Dodd Jr. – former adjunct professor, former United States Ambassador to Uruguay and to Costa Rica
- Waldemar J. Gallman – former United States Ambassador to Iraq and United States Ambassador to Poland
- George Gamow (1934–1954) – physicist and cosmologist
- Gregory G. Garre – law professor, former United States Solicitor General
- Alan Grayson – lecturer in Government Contracts Program, former member of the U.S. House of Representatives
- John Marshall Harlan – former Associate Justice of the United States Supreme Court
- Howard Lincoln Hodgkins – university president, 1921–1923
- Cecil Jacobson – rogue fertility doctor
- Edward P. Jones – Pulitzer Prize-winning author
- Albert Freeman Africanus King – professor of obstetrics
- Christopher Kojm – chairman of the National Intelligence Council
- William Kovacic – chairman of the Federal Trade Commission, former professor of government contracts law
- S. M. Krishna – current Minister of External Affairs of India
- Ken Lay – former assistant professor, former chairman and CEO of Enron
- Joseph LeBaron – former Elliott School faculty, current ambassador to Qatar, former ambassador to Mauritania
- Blake R. Van Leer – president of Georgia Tech, U.S. Army colonel, inventor, and civil rights advocate
- John Logsdon – former member of Columbia Accident Investigation Board, NASA Advisory Council
- William H. Luers – former visiting lecturer, former ambassador to Venezuela, to Czechoslovakia
- Michelle McMurry-Heath – Immunologist and former CEO of the Biotechnology Innovation Organization
- Josiah Meigs – professor of experimental philosophy in the early 19th century
- William Matthew Merrick – former congressman from Maryland, former professor of law
- Andrew A. Michta
- John Miller – former congressman from Washington
- Charles Munroe – former chair of the Department of Chemistry, discoverer of the Munroe effect
- Stanton J. Peelle – former Congressman from Indiana and chief justice of the United States Court of Claims, former professor of law
- Randall R. Rader – former law professor, current federal judge on the United States Court of Appeals for the Federal Circuit
- Walter Reed – medical school instructor, leading disease researcher and physician
- James N. Rosenau – former president of the International Studies Association
- Pedro Rossello – professor of global health, former governor of Puerto Rico
- Howard Sachar – Jewish historian
- Dr. Thomas Sewall – anatomist and founding member of medical department
- Lee Sigelman – former editor of the American Political Science Review
- Peter Plympton Smith – former Congressman from Vermont, former Dean of the Graduate School of Education and Human Development
- John W. Snow – former United States Secretary of the Treasury, former professor of law, as well as graduate
- Stephen Solarz – former congressman from New York
- William Strong – former Associate Justice of the United States Supreme Court
- Edward Teller (1935–1941) – nuclear physicist and father of the hydrogen bomb
- Willis Van Devanter – former Associate Justice of the United States Supreme Court
- Vincent du Vigneaud – biochemist who headed the Biochemistry Department at the George Washington University School of Medicine, recipient of the Nobel Prize in Chemistry in 1955
- Lowell P. Weicker Jr. – former U.S. senator from Connecticut and former professor of law
- Robert Work – Undersecretary of the Navy
- Young-Key Kim-Renaud – first female president of the International Circle of Korean Linguistics
- Ronald H. Spector – military historian
- Martin King Whyte – sociology professor
- Henry Farrell – political scientist

== Board of trustees ==
- John Quincy Adams – former president of the United States, former member
- Burgiss Allison – Chaplain of the United States House of Representatives, original member
- Alexander Graham Bell – inventor, former member
- Obadiah B. Brown – Chaplain of the United States House of Representatives, original member
- Jacob Burns – alumnus, former member
- Bennett Champ Clark – alumnus, former U.S. senator, former member
- Spencer Houghton Cone – Chaplain of the United States House of Representatives, original member
- William Wilson Corcoran – former
- Phil Graham – former co-owner of The Washington Post, former member
- Ulysses S. Grant – former president of the United States, honorary former member
- Ulysses S. Grant III – major general in the United States Army, grandson of President of the United States Ulysses S. Grant, former university vice president and trustee
- Melville Bell Grosvenor – former president of the National Geographic Society and editor of National Geographic magazine, former member
- Eric Holder – Attorney General of the United States, former member
- J. Edgar Hoover – alumnus, first director of the Federal Bureau of Investigation, former member
- Daniel Inouye – alumnus, U.S. senator, former member
- Amos Kendall – former United States Postmaster General, former president of the board
- David M. Kennedy – alumnus, former United States Secretary of Treasury, former member
- Melvin R. Laird – former United States Secretary of Defense, former member
- Ted Lerner – alumnus, billionaire developer and owner of the Washington Nationals, former member
- Randy Levine – alumnus, President of the New York Yankees, current member
- Charles Taylor Manatt – alumnus, former ambassador to the Dominican Republic, former chairman of the Democratic National Committee, former chairman of the board
- Josiah Meigs – original member
- Return J. Meigs Jr. – former governor of Ohio, former US senator, original member
- Luther Rice – original member
- Sharon Percy Rockefeller – wife of U.S. senator Jay Rockefeller, former member
- Thomas Sewall – original member and professor
- Robert H. Smith – former member
- Lewis Strauss – former United States Secretary of Commerce, former member
- Margaret Truman – alumna, daughter of United States President Harry Truman, former member
- John Warner – former U.S. senator, former member
- Mark Warner – alumnus, U.S. senator, former member
