= Campuses of George Washington University =

Coordinates: 38.900750°N 77.047100°W

The George Washington University
- Type: Private
- Established: February 9, 1821
- Endowment: US $2.8 billion
- President: Ellen Granberg
- Location: Washington, D.C., U.S.
- Campus: Urban — Foggy Bottom; Suburban — Mount Vernon; Suburban — Ashburn
- Colors: Buff and Blue
- Website: www.gwu.edu

The campus of the George Washington University (GW), originated on College Hill, a site bounded by 14th Street, Columbia Road, 15th Street and Florida Avenue, NW in the Columbia Heights neighborhood of Washington, D.C. After relocating to the downtown financial district in the 1880s and then to Foggy Bottom in 1912, GW now has three campuses. Foggy Bottom is the location of the university's main campus in Washington, D.C. Also in Washington's Foxhall neighborhood is the Mount Vernon Campus, formerly the Mount Vernon College for Women. Additionally, the George Washington University Virginia Campus is located in Ashburn, VA.

== Foggy Bottom ==
The main GW campus consists of 43 acres (170,000 m^{2}) in historic Foggy Bottom and is located a few blocks from the White House and the National Mall. Barring a few outlying buildings, the boundaries of campus are delineated by Pennsylvania Avenue, 19th Street, E Street, and Virginia Avenue. The University owns much of the property in Foggy Bottom and leases it to various tenants, including the World Bank and the International Monetary Fund. Other nearby institutions include the Harry S. Truman Building (Department of State headquarters), John F. Kennedy Center for the Performing Arts, United States Institute of Peace, Watergate complex, and the embassies of Saudi Arabia, Mexico, Spain, Uruguay, and Bosnia and Herzegovina.

=== Places ===
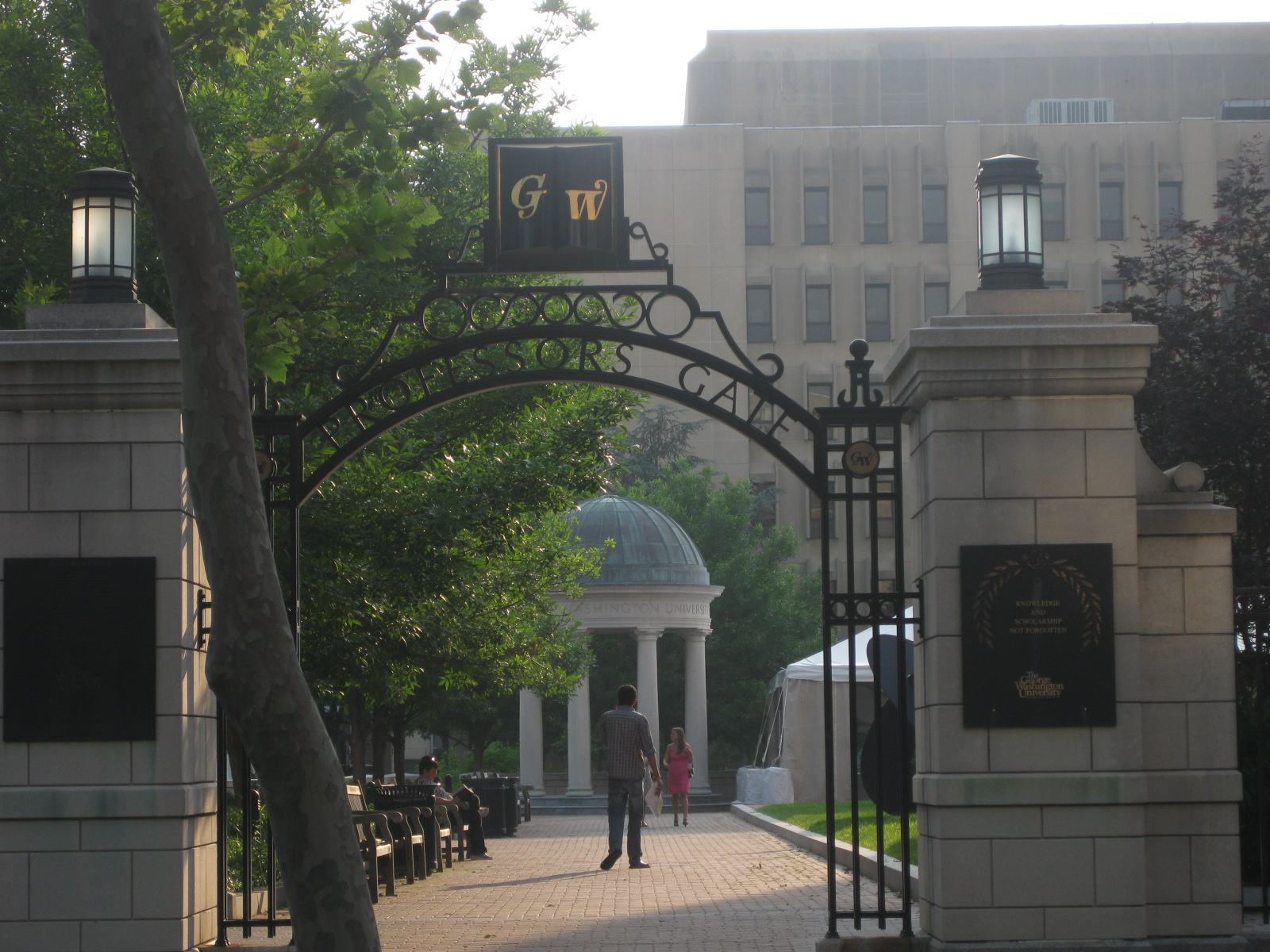
Looking through Professor's Gate at the Midcampus Walk, linking Monroe Court and Kogan Plaza.

Midcampus is a central area of the main campus located between 21st & 22nd Streets and G & H Streets. There are three 'gated' entrances to Midcampus located on 21st, 22nd, and H Streets. Kogan Plaza, located at the Trustees Gate on H Street, is used as a gathering place for students, for social purposes, demonstrations, barbecues, or student organization fairs, among other purposes. Kogan is surrounded by Lisner Auditorium, Gelman Library, and other buildings. It sits across H Street from the District House residence hall (formerly 'Schenley' and 'Crawford' residence halls), as well as the University Student Center (formerly the Marvin Center and now referred to as USC) and the Academic Center (containing Phillips and Rome Halls and the Smith Hall of Art). Behind the University Student Center is Lafayette Hall and the GW Campus Store. The Monroe Court is a landscaped area with cherry trees and a central fountain, located near Hall of Government and Monroe Hall, just off Mid-campus Walk. Next to Government and Monroe Halls are the Campus Deli and the GWPD and EMeRG building, as well as various academic townhouses.

Lisner Auditorium is located on the southwest corner of 21st and H Streets. Since the 1940s, 'Lisner' has been the site of many events. Before the Kennedy Center opened, it was a major center of DC theater life. Lisner is listed on the National Register of Historic Places. South of Lisner is the Margaret Wetzel House, home to the University Honors Program.

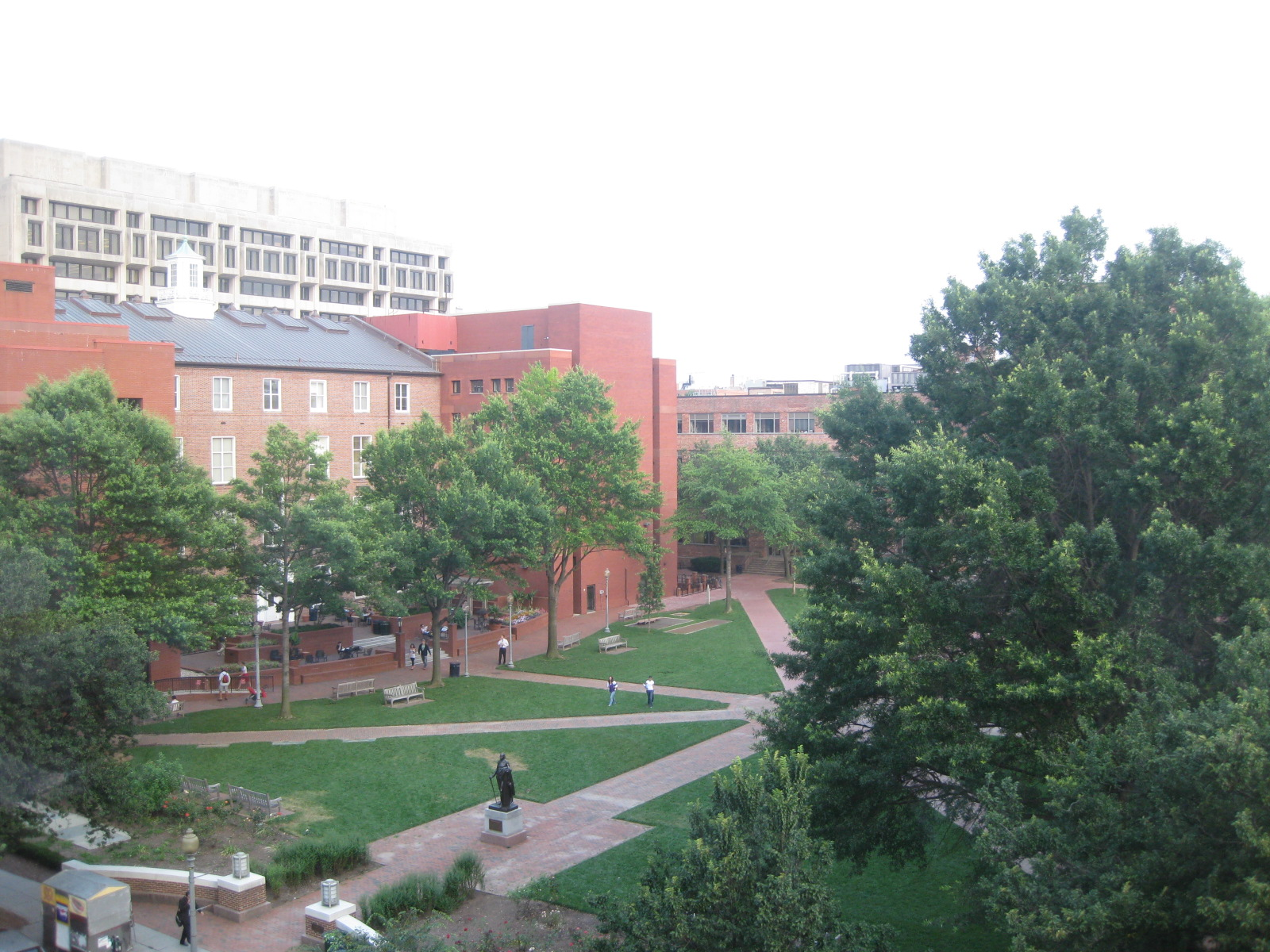
University Yard

University Yard, the historic heart of The George Washington University, is a large green space that is open at its north end to H Street, between 20th and 21st Streets. Like Kogan Plaza, University Yard is used for purposes such as a gathering place for students, for social purposes, demonstrations, barbecues, or student organization fairs, among others. On the eastern edge, along 20th Street, are George Washington University Law School buildings, including Stockton Hall, Theodore Lerner Hall, The Jacob Burns Law Library, Building E, Stuart Hall, and Lisner Hall. On the south side of the Yard are Art Deco landmarks is Bell Hall. Along the western edge of University Yard are Corcoran and Samson Halls, as well as the Woodhull House and the Textile Museum. Corcoran and Stockton Halls, as well as Woodhull House, are listed on the National Register of Historic Places. Just North of U-Yard is the Media and Public Affairs Building (known as MPA), Building XX, and Building YY.

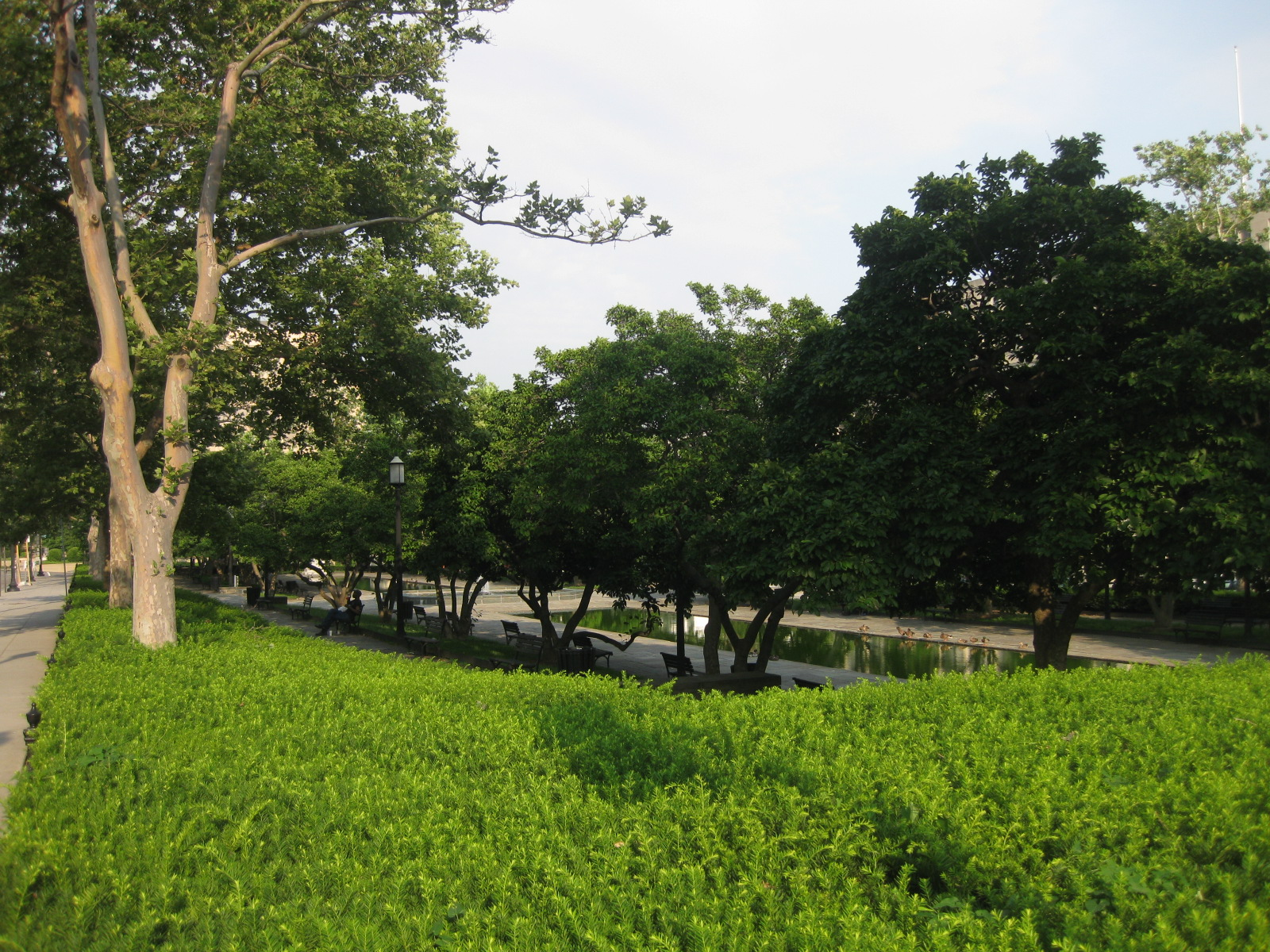
Rawlins Park, across from the Elliott School

The southeast corner of campus features the area that is the furthest east, with an assortment of GW buildings on 19th Street. Additionally the Elliott School of International Affairs building is the building that is furthest south on campus, located on E Street. Elliott School classes and administrative offices are located in the 1957 E Street section of the building that occupies the block of 19th to 20th Streets. Also in this building is the 1959 E Street residence hall for upperclassmen that features a Starbucks and Subway at its base. Across from the Elliott School are the public Rawlins Park and various government buildings, including the General Services Administration, the Interior Department, and the State Department's headquarters, Harry S. Truman Building. On 19th Street are Mitchell Hall and Thurston Hall residences. 'Mitchell' houses a Chick Fil A at its base.

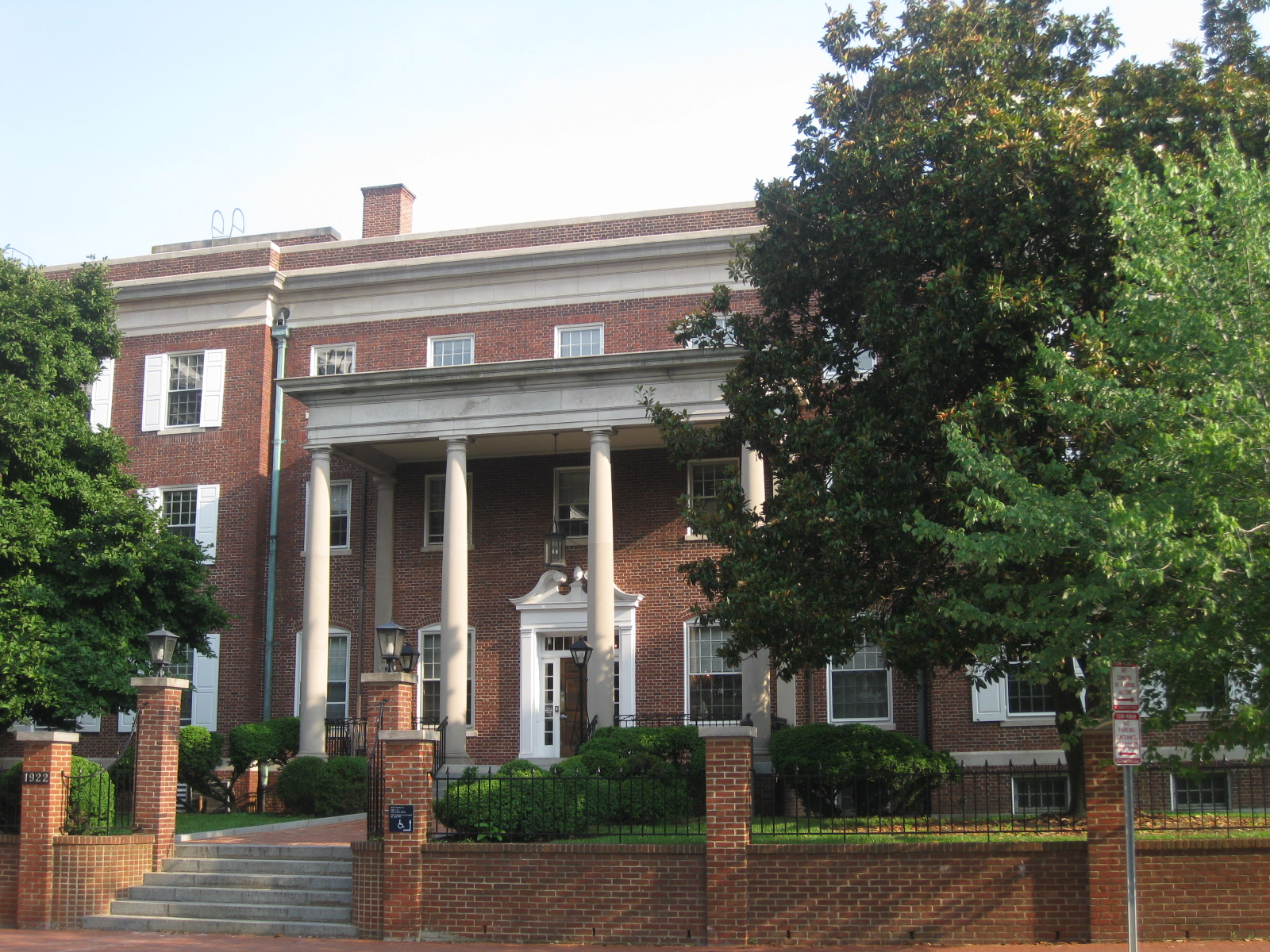
Old Main houses Alumni Relations

At the corner of 19th and F Streets is Thurston, also across from an International Monetary Fund building. Thurston is the largest freshman residence hall at the university. Located next to Thurston on F Street, heading west, are the President's Office, which is listed on the National Register of Historic Places, and Alumni Relations at the Old Main building. Also on the National Register and across the street is the 1925 F Street Club, which today serves as the President's Residence/The F Street House. Behind the President's residence is the historic Concordia German Evangelical Church and Rectory. Across 20th Street from the President's Residence is also Francis Scott Key Hall, a sophomore residence. Next to FSK is the Burns Law Clinic and the Learning Law Center, which is a part of the larger Law Complex.

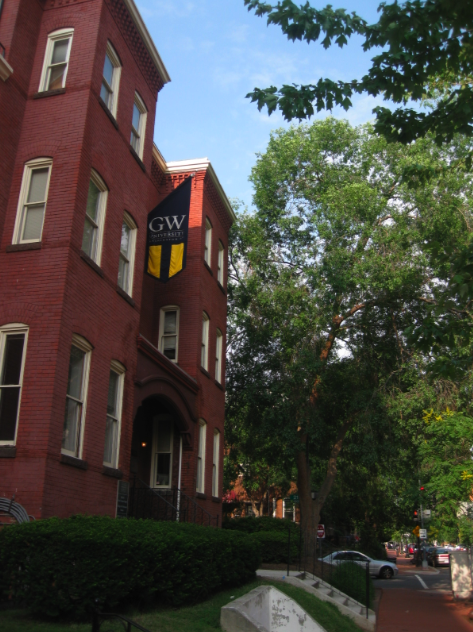
This townhouse is home to Organizational Sciences and Communications Department

Adjacent to 'FSK' is Potomac House, or 'Potomac', heading west on F Street. Potomac is a newer freshman residence hall. Next to Potomac is an administrative building for Facilities and Package Services called the Support Building. Building JJ, a small residence hall, stands next-door, as well as the Military Community Center and NROTC building. Behind these buildings sit a few townhouses, one of which is home to the GW student newspaper "the Hatchet." These sit adjacent to the Tonic at Quigley's Restaurant and across the street from Hattie M Strong Hall, the universities only women exclusive residence hall. Along the south side of F Street between 20th and 21st Streets are a collection of non-university apartment buildings that house many students who choose not to live in university housing.

Behind Strong Hall lies Square 80, a park for students to enjoy similar to Mid-campus and U-Yard. Surrounding square 80 is multiple residence halls including 2109 F St, Guthridge Hall, South Hall, and a variety of Greek Life and Academic Townhouses, many of which are part of the Graduate School of Education and Human Development or GSEHD.

Across the street from these townhouses is the Charles E. Smith Athletic Center, on 22nd Street. The 'Smith Center' is a 5,000 seat multipurpose arena that is home to Revolutionaries basketball games, commencement exercises, orientation exercises, and entertainment events. North of the Smith Center sits Funger Hall and Duques Hall (which is home to the School of Business). South of the Smith Center at Virginia Avenue sits International House, an upper-class residence hall and the only residence hall on campus to feature balconies in student rooms. Behind the Smith Center is Townhouse Row, a collection of Townhouses used for Greek Life Housing.

Across the street from Townhouse Row is Mark Shenkman Hall, which is adjacent to the Lerner Health and Wellness Center, also known as HellWell, on the 23rd and H Streets northwest corner. HellWell features a gym, a three-lane lap swimming pool, a suspended jogging track, basketball courts, two gymnasia, four racquetball courts, six squash courts, and other facilities. HellWell sits near Phillip Amsterdam Hall or "Amdam," GW Hillel Building, and Tompkins Hall of Engineering.

Up the street from these buildings is the recently building Science and Engineering Hall or "SEH," which is the largest building on campus. This building is surrounded by the three beige residence halls reserved for Sophomores: Munson hall, JBKO Hall, and Fulbright Hall. Across the street from SEH is the freshman dorm Madison Hall. Madison, Fulbright, and Munson are national landmarks.

Next to Washington Circle is the George Washington University Hospital and the Milken School of Public Health. New Hampshire Avenue and Pennsylvania Avenue lead into the circle, as does 23rd Street. South of the hospital is the Foggy Bottom - GWU Metro Station. The station serves the Blue, Orange and Silver Lines, which provides students with a direct line to Capitol Hill, among other popular stations. This station sits just north of Ross Hall and the Himmelfarb Library.

GW additionally hosts classrooms in the basement floors of 1776 G St and bases the Corcoran School of Arts and Design out of the Corcoran Gallery/Flagg Building next to the White House.

== Mount Vernon ==
The Mount Vernon Campus or "the Vern" is a satellite campus used for freshman housing and certain classes like the required freshman course of University Writing. The Vern includes residence halls: West Hall, Somers Hall, and the Hillsides (Clark Hall, Cole Hall, Hensley Hall, and Merriweather Hall). Academic Buildings Include Ames Hall, Post Hall, the Academic Building, The Acheson Science Center, and the Webb Building. The MVC includes numerous sports fields, a pool (known as the Vool), a small clock tower, and a Hand Chapel. The Mount Vernon Campus is more secluded and suburban as opposed to the downtown foggy bottom campus.

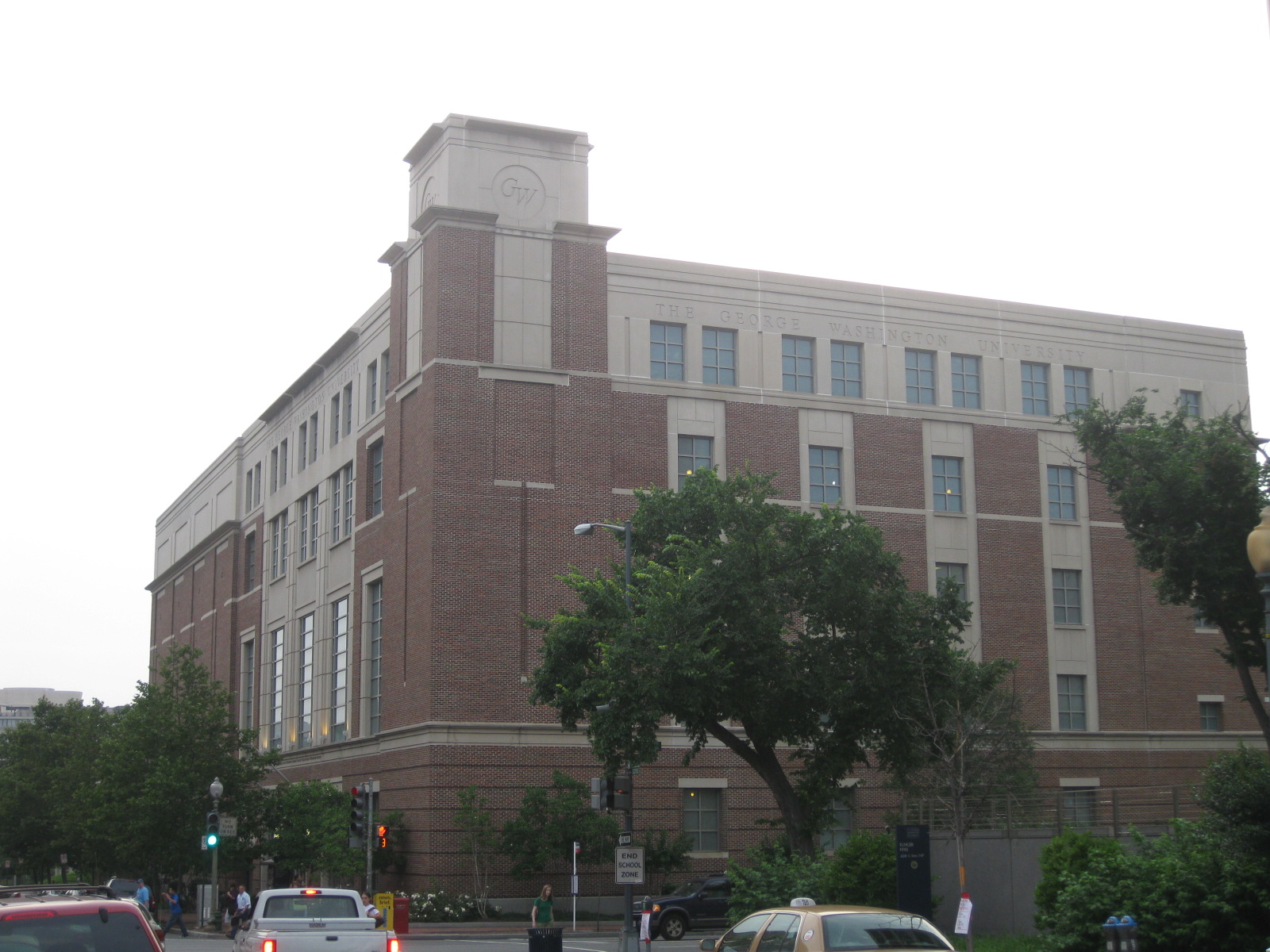
The Lerner Health and Wellness Center
