= Arie M. Dubnov =

Historian and professor of Israeli studies

- Born: June 13, 1977 (age 49); Petach-Tikva, Israel
- Occupations: Jewish historian, educator, and essayist
- Title: Max Ticktin Chair; Middle East Program Director
- Awards: Full list

Academic background
- Education: Hebrew University of Jerusalem (BA, MA, PhD)

Academic work
- Discipline: History; International affairs
- Institutions: George Washington University; Stanford University; University of Haifa
- Main interests: Jewish and Israeli history, intellectual history, and nationalism

Arie M. Dubnov (Hebrew: אריה דובנוב; born 1977) is an Israeli-born, US-based essayist and historian. He specializes in modern Jewish and Israeli history, nationalism, the history of the British Empire in the Middle East, and intellectual history. He currently serves as the Max Ticktin Chair of Israel Studies at George Washington University.

== Early life and career ==
Dubnov was born in Petach-Tikvah, Israel, in 1977. He grew up in Afula and later Elkana, a religious-Zionist settlement in the West Bank, before attending the Israel Arts and Science Academy in Jerusalem. His parents had immigrated from the Soviet Union in the 1970s, and his mother, born in Lviv (formerly Lwów), was the sole survivor of her family murdered in the [Holocaust]. On his paternal side, Dubnov is related to historian Simon Dubnow, his father’s great-uncle.

Before serving mandatory time in the Israel Defense Forces, Dubnov volunteered with the Society for the Protection of Nature in Israel (SPNI). After serving in a Givati reconnaissance unit in southern Lebanon, he wrote a short story, "48 Ricochets from Lebanon," about his experiences in the IDF. As a reservist, he refused to serve in the Occupied Territories and was dismissed from duty.

Dubnow earned his BA, MA, and PhD in history from the Hebrew University of Jerusalem, where he studied [Steven E. Aschheim]. He was a George L. Mosse fellow at the University of Wisconsin–Madison before serving as acting assistant professor at Stanford University and Senior Lecturer at the University of Haifa. In 2017, Dubnov became the inaugural holder of the Max Ticktin Chair of Israel Studies at George Washington University, where he also serves as director of the Middle East Program in addition to his role as chair.

Active in social and political commentary, Dubnov has expressed criticism of rising anti-intellectualism, fascism, and far-right nationalism in both his home country of Israel and the United States. He has also cited authors Vladimir Nabokov, Elsa Morante, and Meir Shalev, among others, as influences for his work and thought.

== Research and writing ==
Dubnov’s scholarship spans intellectual history, Zionism, Empire and decolonization, and comparative nationalism. His work often explores the intersections of liberalism, Jewish identity, and imperial contexts, and he has written extensively on British imperial federalism, the history of Zionism, and the global history of partitions.

Dubnov’s first book, Isaiah Berlin: The Journey of a Jewish Liberal (2012), was an intellectual biography of the liberal philosopher and British-Jewish thinker Isaiah Berlin. The book offers a reassessment of Berlin’s life and thought, tracing his intellectual development from childhood to his more mature work. It examines Berlin both as an East European Jewish émigré and a British liberal thinker, highlighting the relationship between his liberal philosophy and his Zionist sympathies.

The book received mixed reviews from critics. Historian Noam Pianko praised it as “a compelling claim that Berlin’s ambivalence toward Zionism shaped his communitarian impulses and distinguished him from other British liberal theorists,” while political theorist Kei Hiruta described it as “a well-researched and illuminating study that situates Berlin’s thought within the tensions of his Jewish identity and liberal commitments.” However, Aileen Kelly, a historian of Russian intellectual history, criticized the book for downplaying Berlin’s Russian identity, while political scientist Joshua Cherniss characterized it as “an insightful but sometimes overstated attempt to read Berlin through the lens of Jewishness.”

Parallel to his work on Berlin, Dubnov also wrote on other prominent 20^{th-}century Jewish intellectuals, including Jacob L. Talmon, Hannah Arendt, and Leo Strauss highlighting the interplay between Jewish identity, political commitment, and liberal thought.

In later years, Dubnov's scholarship has made use of the lens of transnational history to examine the Zionist movement, focusing on the movement's connections to the British Empire in particular. Dubnov's work Partitions: A Transnational History of 20th Century Territorial Separatism (2019), which he co-edited with Yale University historian Laura Robson. This volume argued that the partitions of [Ireland] (1921), [Palestine] (1937 and 1947), and [India/Pakistan] (1947) were not coincidentally similar but part of a shared repertoire of ideas and practices. Dubnov showed how ideas regarding cantonization and partition of Palestine traveled and identified key figures, such as the Oxford historian Reginald Coupland, who acted as “idea carriers,” linking these sites and shaping global processes.

=== Role in AIS dispute (2019) ===
In 2019, Dubnov was awarded the AIS-Israel Institute Young Scholar Award from the Association for Israel Studies (AIS). However, he declined the award and an invitation to join the AIS board, protesting against the special issue of the journal Israel Studies entitled "Word Crimes: Reclaiming The Language of the Israeli-Palestinian Conflict." Dubnov, along with numerous other scholars, criticized the "Word Crimes" issue for blurring the lines between advocacy and scholarship and attempting to police academic debate on the Israeli-Palestinian conflict.

During the controversy, numerous board members resigned and issued a letter of dissent, arguing that the special issue deviated from academic standards and began to stray too far into political advocacy. Following the protest, the co-editors of Israel Studies published a statement acknowledging flaws in the decision-making process, expressing regret, and pledging to implement clear governance and editorial procedures. However, they did not retract the issue, maintaining that such dissent was not "universal."

Dubnov left the AIS and joined the editorial board of the journal [Palestine/Israel Review], which published its first issue in November 2024.

== Commentary and literary works ==
Dubnov is an active public intellectual. In addition to his scholarly work, Dubnov has written a number of Hebrew and English essays, op-eds, and short stories for publications such as Haaretz, Yedioth Ahronoth, Public Seminar and The Jewish Quarterly, Tel Aviv Review of Books, and Eurozine among others.

Following the Hamas attacks of 7 October 2023, Dubnov published several essays in Hebrew, English and German that argued that they exposed not only a catastrophic security failure but also the dangers of responding through familiar narratives of revenge, militarism, and national humiliation. He insisted that despite understandable historical comparisons to pogroms and the Holocaust, the attacks were more usefully understood through the analogy of the September 11 attacks in the United States and warned that the combination of fear and demands for immediate retaliation could lead to the erosion of democratic safeguards, emergency measures that weaken constitutional restraints, and prolonged wars.

In addition to his academic works, Dubnov writes on Hebrew literature, including essays on Hayyim Nahman Bialik, Amos Oz, Haim Gouri, and Yehudit Hendel, as well as short stories and translations published in Hebrew literary magazines such as Granta in Hebrew and Ho!.

== Awards and honors ==
- AIS-Israel Institute Young Scholar Award (declined)
- George L. Mosse Fellow, University of Wisconsin-Madison
- Berlin Institute for Advanced Study (Wissenschaftskolleg zu Berlin) Fellowship
- Leibniz Institute of European History Fellowship
- Dorset Visiting Fellowship, Oxford University
- Visiting Fellowship, Parkes Institute for the Study of Jewish/non-Jewish Relations, University of Southampton
- Franklin Research Grant, the American Philosophical Society

== Selected works ==
=== Books ===
- Isaiah Berlin: The Journey of a Jewish Liberal (Palgrave Macmillan, 2012)
- Partitions: A Transnational History of 20th Century Territorial Separatism (co-edited with Laura Robson, Stanford University Press, 2019).
- Amos Oz’s Two Pens: Between Literature and Politics (Routledge, 2023).
- Zionism – A New History: The Beginnings of Jewish Nationalism (Lamda/Open University Press, 2025, in Hebrew).
- Zionism Before Israel: Jewish Nationalism in the Age of Empire (Harvard University Press, 2027)

=== Articles ===
- “Politics of the Comparative Gaze: The Three Languages of Right-Wing Zionist Radicalism,” Palestine/Israel Review (2025).
- “Nahum Slouschz and the Birth of Hebraic Mediterraneità,” Geschichte und Gesellschaft (2023).
- “‘I Am Civil War,’ Or: Haim Gouri’s Poetics of Lyrical Concealment,” Dibur: Literary Journal (2023).
- “The Toynbee Affair at 100: The Birth of ‘World History’ and the Long Shadow of the Interwar Liberal Imaginaire,” Histories (2023).
- “Can Parallels Meet? Hannah Arendt and Isaiah Berlin on the Jewish Post-Emancipatory Quest for Political Freedom,” Leo Baeck Institute Year Book (2017).
- "'Those New Men of the Sixties': Nihilism in the Liberal Imagination." Rethinking History, vol. 17, no. 1 (2013), 18-40.
- “Anti-Cosmopolitan Liberalism: Isaiah Berlin, Jacob Talmon and the Dilemma of National Identity,” Nations and Nationalism (2010).
