= Gelman Library =

Main academic library of George Washington University

The Gelman Library
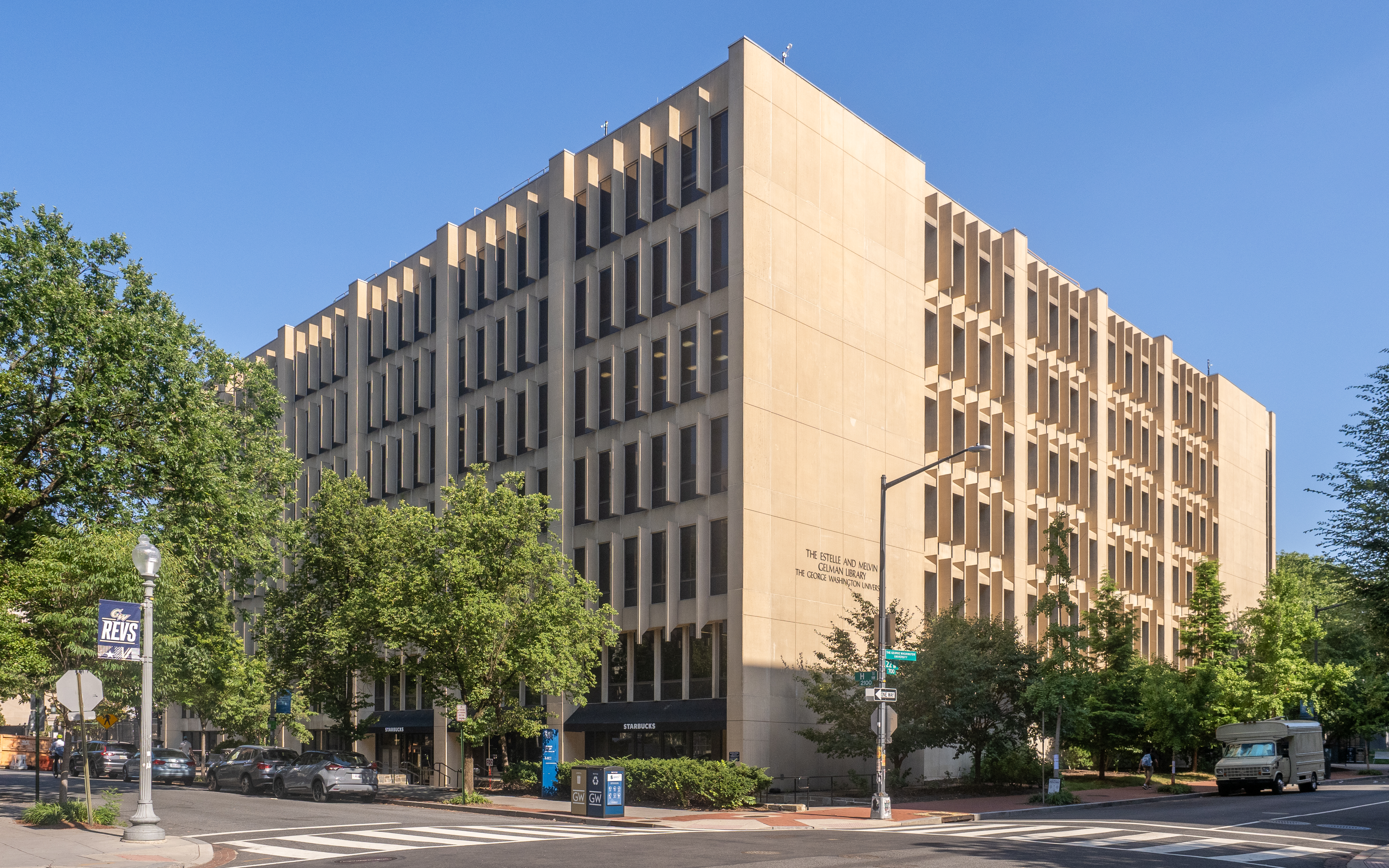
- Gelman Library in 2024
- 38°53′57″N 77°02′54″W
- Location: Washington, D.C., United States
- Established: 1973; 53 years ago

Collection
- Size: 2 million volumes

Access and use
- Access requirements: Students, faculty, and staff

Other information
- Director: Barbra Giorgini
- Website: GW Libraries Portal

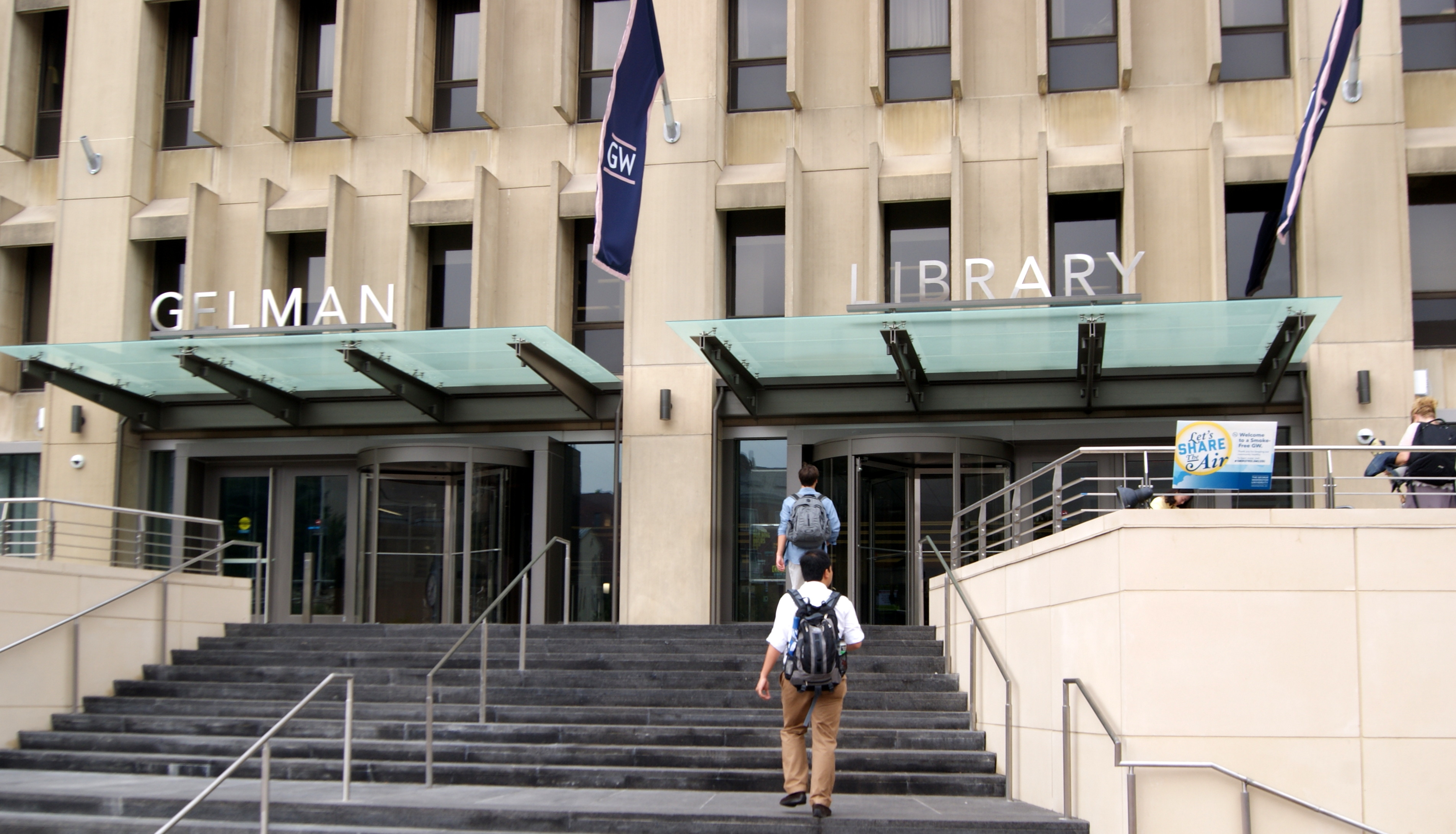
Entrance to Gelman Library from Kogan Plaza.

The Estelle and Melvin Gelman Library, more commonly known as Gelman Library, is the main library of George Washington University, and is located on its Foggy Bottom campus, at the corner of 22nd and H Streets. Along with the Eckles Library at the Mount Vernon Campus and the library at the George Washington University Virginia Campus, it is one of three major libraries of George Washington University. The Himmelfarb Health Sciences Library and the Jacob Burns Law Library also serve the university. The Gelman Library is a member of the Washington Research Library Consortium and the Association of Research Libraries.

The 7-story library was built in 1973 and was renamed the Gelman Library in 1980 after a contribution from the estate of Melvin Gelman, a local real estate developer and alumnus of the university. In 2010, after his wife, Estelle Gelman, died, the library was renamed Estelle and Melvin Gelman Library.

For most of the year, parts of the library are open 24 hours per day, seven days per week for use by students, faculty, and staff.

It contains over two million volumes.

It is constructed in the Brutalist architectural style. It features a concrete façade punctuated by windows that are divided by projecting vertical slabs.

The ground level contains a Starbucks.

== Notable collections ==
The 7th floor contains:

- The National Security Archive, a research institution that publishes declassified files on foreign policy of the United States. It was a National Security Archive Freedom of Information Act request that eventually made the Central Intelligence Agency's so-called "Family Jewels" public.
- Special Collections – primary and secondary resources for researchers, as well as a large collection on Washington.
- Edward Kiev Judaica Collection – Includes the leading collection of modern Hebrew rare books, maps, and archival materials related to Judaic studies among universities in the Washington, D.C. area.
- Global Resource Center – numerous sources focusing on the 20th century to present day that analyze political, socio-economic, historical, and cultural aspects of countries and regions worldwide.

== 2013 renovation ==
The university hired architecture firm Cox Graae & Spack Architects in December 2010 to help determine the scope of a renovation project. By February 2011, the university announced the prospective plan for renovations. As part of the fiscal year 2012 operating and capital budgets, the George Washington University Board of Trustees approved a $16 million renovation project for Gelman Library. The project plan included renovations of the entrance level of the building. Moving the library entrance from H ST to Kogan Plaza, the new second floor plan presents learning commons featuring group study spaces with wireless technology and laptop bars. Construction began late May 2012. After a little over one year of construction, the Gelman library opened a new entrance floor to the public in August 2013. The design upgrade, which focused on providing more natural light and open space for students, boasts new amenities to meet modern students’ needs, such as more outlets to recharge laptops, and technology enabled study rooms. Such technologies include a digital media lab where students may check out cameras for use, a digital visualization room containing a 3D screen to better examine data, and five additional study rooms equipped with large monitors that can be connected to laptops to make collaboration on group projects easier. The second floor is completed with new laptop bars and a snack lounge equipped with two water bottle refill stations.

== Antisemitic incident ==
In October 2023, a student group advocating for the Palestinian cause projected images on the library that advocated for the destruction of the state of Israel and for ethnic cleansing of Jews from what is now Israel. The slogans were deemed to be antisemitic and resulted in a student group suspension.

== See also ==
- List of Brutalist architecture in the United States
