= Partition (politics) =

Political border splitting a territory

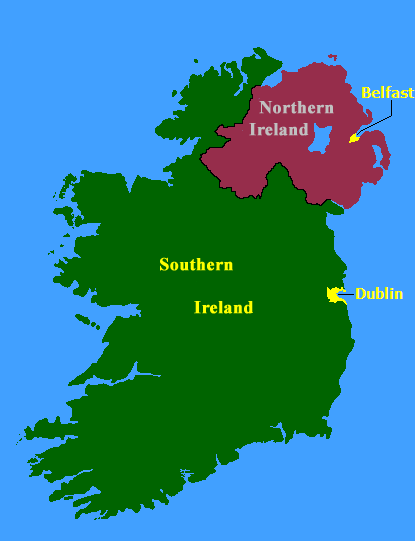
The island of Ireland after partition between the primarily Irish nationalist Southern Ireland (today the Republic of Ireland) and the Irish unionist-majority Northern Ireland (today part of the United Kingdom of Great Britain and Northern Ireland).

In international relations, a partition is a division of a previously unified territory into two or more parts.

Brendan O'Leary distinguishes partition, a change of political borders cutting through at least one territory considered a homeland by some community, from secession, which takes place within existing recognized political units. For Arie Dubnov and Laura Robson, partition is the physical division of territory along ethno-religious lines into separate nation-states.

== History ==
Dubnov and Robson locate partition in the context of post-World War I peacebuilding and the "new conversations surrounding ethnicity, nationhood, and citizenship" that emerged from it. The post-war agreements, such as the League of Nations mandate system, promoted "a new political language of ethnic separatism as a central aspect of national self-determination, while protecting and disguising continuities and even expansions of French and, especially, British imperial powers. After World War II, they argue, partition transformed from "an imperial tactic into an organizing principle" of world diplomacy".

Ranabir Samaddar agrees that partition gained prominence following World War I, particularly with the partition of the Ottoman Empire and the Dissolution of Austria-Hungary, resulting from competing national ambitions. By this point, he argues, ethnicity had become the primary justification of border proposals.

Scholarship has closely linked partition to violence. Tracing the precedent for the Partition of Ireland in population resettlements across former Ottoman Empire territories and the making of national 'majorities' and 'minorities', Dubnov and Robson emphasise how partitions after Ireland contained proposals to transfer "inconvenient populations in addition to forcible territorial division into separate states," which they note had violent consequences for local actors who were devolved the task of "carving out physically separate political entities on the ground and making them ethnically homogenous".

T.G. Fraser notes that Britain proposed partition in both Ireland and Palestine as a method of resolving conflict between competing national groups, but in neither case did it end communal violence. Rather, Fraser argues, partition merely gave these conflicts a "new dimension".

Similarly, A. Dirk Moses asserts partition does not "so much solve minority issues as deposit them into different containers as minority issues reappear in partitioned units", rejecting what he calls "divine cartographies" that seek to "neatly map peoples as naturally emplaced in their homelands" for disregarding the heterogeneous reality of identity in the real world.

== Arguments for ==
- historicist – that partition is inevitable, or already in progress
- last resort – that partition should be pursued to avoid the worst outcomes (genocide or large-scale ethnic expulsion), if all other means fail
- cost–benefit – that partition offers a better prospect of conflict reduction than if the existing borders are not changed
- better tomorrow – that partition will reduce current violence and conflict, and that the new more homogenized states will be more stable
- rigorous end – heterogeneity leads to problems, hence homogeneous states should be the goal of any policy

== Arguments against ==
- national territorial unity will be lost
- bi-nationalism and multi-nationalism are not undesirable
- the impossibility of a just partition
- difficult in deciding how the new border(s) will be drawn
- the likelihood of disorder and violence
- partitioning alone does not lead to the desired homogenization
- security issues arising within the borders of the new states

Daniel Posner has argued that partitions of diverse communities into homogenous communities is unlikely to solve problems of communal conflict, as the boundary changes will alter the actors' incentives and give rise to new cleavages. For example, while the Muslim and Hindu cleavages might have been the most salient amid the Indian independence movement, the creation of a religiously homogenous Hindu state (India) and a religiously homogeneous Muslim state (Pakistan) created new social cleavages on lines other than religion in both of those states. Posner writes that relatively homogenous countries can be more violence-prone than countries with a large number of evenly matched ethnic groups.

== Examples ==
=== Europe and the Middle East ===
- Partition, multiple times, of the Roman Empire into the Eastern and Western Roman Empire, following the Crisis of the Third Century.
- Partition of Prussia by the Second Peace of Thorn in 1466. creating Royal Prussia, and Duchy of Prussia in 1525
- Partition of Catalonia by the Treaty of the Pyrenees in 1659: Northern Catalan territories (Roussillon) were given to France by Spain.
- In the Treaty of Versailles (1757), France and Austria agreed upon the partition of Prussia
- German occupation of Czechoslovakia: The Sudetenland was ceded to Nazi Germany under the Munich Agreement of 1938, and the country was later divided into the German-administered Protectorate of Bohemia and Moravia and the nominally independent Slovak Republic; later reunified at the end of World War II.
- Three Partitions of Luxembourg, the last of which in 1839, divided Luxembourg between France, Prussia, Belgium, and the independent Grand Duchy of Luxembourg.
- Three Partitions of Poland in 1772, 1793, and 1795, which led to the complete annihilation of the Polish–Lithuanian Commonwealth.
- The Treaty of Bucharest in 1913 partitioned the region of Macedonia between Serbia (now North Macedonia), Greece and Bulgaria.
- Partition of Tyrol by the London Pact of 1915 ratified during World War I.
- Partition of the German Empire in 1919 by the Treaty of Versailles.
- Partition of Prussia in 1919.
- Partition of the Ottoman Empire.
- Partition of the Austro-Hungarian Empire by the Treaty of Saint-Germain-en-Laye and the Treaty of Trianon.
- Partition of Ireland in 1920 into Northern Ireland and Southern Ireland
  - This partition was only partially implemented as, following the Irish War of Independence, Southern Ireland became the Irish Free State
- The First Republic of Armenia ended with the dual invasions by Turkey and the Soviet Union. The country was partitioned whereby Western Armenia was transferred to Turkey and Azerbaijan and Eastern Armenia was incorporated into the USSR as the Armenian Soviet Republic. The partition was initially demarcated in the Alexandropol Treaty which forced Armenia to forfeit all claims to Western Armenia which had been promised under the Treaty of Sèvres, as well as cede a large part of the south of Yerevan province to Azerbaijan, which was to become the Turkish protectorate of Nakhchivan. The borders were later finalized by the Turkey and the USSR in the Treaty of Kars (1921) and Treaty of Moscow (1921).
- Partition of Allied-occupied Germany and Berlin after World War II
  - The Morgenthau Plan proposed independent states in North and South Germany, an international zone in the Ruhr Area, and the transfer of disputed border areas to France and Poland
  - The actual post-war settlement created West Germany and East Germany and included the annexation of former eastern territories of Germany by Poland and the Soviet Union. Later, East and West Germany were unified at the end of the Cold War.
  - Partition of East Prussia between Poland and the Soviet Union
- The 1947 United Nations Partition Plan for Palestine was never fully implemented
  - Following the expiration of the British Mandate, David Ben-Gurion declared the establishment of a Jewish state in unspecified borders
  - The 1948 Palestine war and 1949 Armistice Agreements resulted in the territories of the proposed Arab state in the 1947 plan being occupied by Israel, Transjordan, and Egypt.
- Breakup of Yugoslavia in the 1990s.
  - Independence of Croatia, Bosnia and Herzegovina, North Macedonia and Slovenia from Yugoslavia (leaving Serbia and Montenegro).
  - Failed partition of the Republic of Serbian Krajina in Croatia after the Croatian War
  - Ethno-political partition of Bosnia and Herzegovina into two entities, the Serb-majority Republika Srpska and the Bosniak-Croat-majority Federation of Bosnia and Herzegovina, after the Bosnian War.
- Partition of Czechoslovakia in 1993 into the independent entities of the Czech Republic and Slovakia.
- Partition of Cyprus in 1974 (de facto), into Greek-majority Cyprus and Turkish-majority Northern Cyprus after the Turkish invasion of Cyprus.
- Possible Partition of Kosovo after disputed independence (partition from Serbia) in 2008. See also Kosovo independence precedent.

=== Everywhere else ===
- Partition of Africa (Scramble for Africa), between 1881 and 1914 under the General Act of the Berlin Conference.
- Partition of the U.S. state of Virginia in 1863 after Virginia joined the Confederacy in the American Civil War, 50 northwestern counties rejoined the Union as the State of West Virginia.
- 1947 Partition of Punjab into East Punjab and West Punjab.
- 1905 Partition of Bengal and 1947 Partition of Bengal into East Bengal and West Bengal.
- Partition of Korea in 1945 into American and Soviet zones of occupation.
  - Division of Korea in 1953 between North Korea and South Korea after the Korean War.
- Partition of India (colonial British India) in 1947 into the independent dominions (later republics) of India and Pakistan (which included modern-day Bangladesh).
- Partition of China after the Chinese Civil War in 1946–1950 separated the original territory of the Republic of China into the People's Republic of China in Mainland China and the Republic of China on Taiwan and other island groups.
- Partition of Punjab in 1966 into the states of Punjab, Haryana and Himachal Pradesh.
- Partition of Vietnam in 1954 between North Vietnam and South Vietnam under the Geneva Accord after the First Indochina War. Later reunified in 1975 after the Vietnam War.
- The hypothetical partition of the Canadian province of Quebec.
- Partition of Sudan into two entities in 2011, the Muslim-majority Sudan and the Christian-majority South Sudan.

== See also ==
- Separatism
- Secession
