= Ami Zota =

Academic background
- Education: University of North Carolina at Chapel Hill (BSPH); Harvard School of Public Health; (MS, ScD)

Ami R. Zota is an associate professor at George Washington University Milken School of Public Health, specializing in public and occupational health.

== Education ==
Zota graduated from the University of North Carolina at Chapel Hill in 1999 with a bachelor's degree in environmental science and engineering. She later graduated from the Harvard School of Public Health with a master's and doctorate in environmental health in 2003 and 2007, respectively.

== Career ==
Zota has undertaken research on many issues relating to public health. For instance, how fast foods eaters are more likely to be exposed to di(2-ethylhexyl) phthalate and diisononyl phthalate, and co-authoring a meta-study on household chemicals present in US household dust, concluding that many chemicals present in household dust share endocrine or reproductive toxicity.

Zota serves on the editorial board of journal Journal of Exposure Science & Environmental Epidemiology by Nature.

== Awards ==
Zota is the recipient of a career development award from the National Institutes of Environmental Health Sciences for her work identifying how environmental hazards may interact with social disadvantage and psychosocial stressors to exacerbate harms during pregnancy. She was recognized by the Collaborative on Health and the Environment as a Pioneer under 40 in Environmental Public Health.
