= Christopher Mores =

American arbovirologist

Dr. Christopher N. Mores
- Education: Rutgers University (BS); Harvard University (SM); Harvard University (ScD)
- Scientific career
- Fields: Vector-borne disease Zoonotic disease Vaccinology; Infectious disease Global health Immunology; Virology
- Institutions: Milken Institute School of Public Health
- Website: GW website

Christopher Mores is an American (US) arbovirologist, trained in infectious disease epidemiology. He is a professor in the Department of Global Health at the Milken Institute School of Public Health, the program director for the Global Health Epidemiology and Disease Control MPH program, and is director of a high-containment research laboratory at the George Washington University in Washington, DC.

== Early life and education ==
Mores first gained an interest in infectious disease after taking a microbiology course taught by Dr. Douglas Eveleigh while earning his Bachelor of Science degree in biological sciences from Rutgers University in 1995. He then went on to receive his Master of Science in Tropical Public Health from Harvard University in 1998, and his Doctor of Science in Immunology and Infectious Diseases under Dr. Andrew Spielman from Harvard University in 2002. During these years he worked at the Massachusetts Department of Health on Arboviral and Zoonotic Disease Surveillance where he developed a program for biological threat testing and emergency response. He then completed postdoctoral training in vector-borne and viral hemorrhagic fever viruses as a National Research Council Fellow at United States Army Medical Research Institute of Infectious Diseases.

== Career ==
Following his postdoctoral training, in 2004 Mores became an assistant professor at the University of Florida Medical Entomology Laboratory. While there, he worked to improve public health capacity, research arboviruses, and build arbovirus surveillance programs in Central Asia in collaboration with the US Department of Defense.

In 2007, he became assistant professor at Louisiana State University (LSU), and was later promoted to associate professor in 2010, and then to professor in 2015. At LSU, he also led laboratories researching pathogen emergence, was the associate director of the Center for Experimental Infectious Disease Research, and the director of the high-containment laboratory at the LSU School of Veterinary Medicine. There he researched the transmission systems of dengue, Zika, and chikungunya viruses, led a consortium of mathematical modelers to develop novel predictive tools, and investigated numerous outbreaks. This included serving as the lead epidemiologist, biocontainment specialist, and infection control officer for the Irish NGO GOAL Aid Agency during the 2014-2015 West African Ebola outbreak in Sierra Leone. While there, he developed and deployed biocontainment strategies to mitigate the outbreak, both in the community and at the Ebola Treatment Center in Port Loko.

Upon his return form Sierra Leone, Mores accepted the head of the Virology and Emerging Infections Department at the Naval Medical Research Unit Six in Peru. During this time, he investigated the initial Zika virus outbreak in the Americas and managed programs and acute febrile illness, influenza surveillance, community-acquired gastroenteritis, and diagnostic platform development using pathogen discovery (NGS) techniques.

Currently, he is a professor in the Department of Global Health at the Milken Institute School of Public Health at the George Washington University in Washington, D.C., where he is also the director of a high-containment research laboratory. He continues to work closely with the US government and industry on countermeasures to emerging infectious disease threats. Most of his time at GW has focused on work relating to the COVID-19 pandemic, including testing the effectiveness of vaccine candidates as well as diagnostic and antibody tests. He has participated in over 250 live TV, radio, and print media interviews related to the SARS-CoV-2 outbreak. Despite the pandemic, he continued to work with the US CDC and the Institut National pour la Recherche Biomedicale on Ebola outbreak response in the Democratic Republic of Congo. There he supported local and international field teams and developed programs to improve laboratory capacity. Mores also holds an adjunct professorship at Tulane University.

Mores has over 100 peer reviewed publications and is a Fellow of American Society of Tropical Medicine & Hygiene (FASTMH). He is an active member of American Society of Tropical Medicine & Hygiene (ASTMH), American Committee on Arthropod-borne Viruses, American Committee on Medical Entomology, American Committee on Global Health and American Society for Virology.
