= Jacob Burns (attorney) =

American lawyer (1902–1993)

Jacob Burns (1902–1993) was a prominent New York attorney specializing in corporate law and estates and trusts. He was a philanthropist, a painter, and a corporate leader. He was a founder and, for several years, chairman of the board of U.S. Vitamin and Pharmaceutical Corp., a public company that merged with Revlon in 1966. Mr. Burns was a member of the Revlon board of directors from 1966 to 1985.

== Early life ==
Burns was born in the Russian Empire in 1902. When Burns was eleven years old, his family immigrated to the United States from Kyiv, Ukraine. His father, George Burns (born Zorak Bialack) settled in Washington, D.C., around 1915, and opened what may have been that city's first silent movie house on 14th St. NW. As a teen, it was Jacob Burns’s job to deliver the film to the theater on his bicycle and to work the pedals of the player piano throughout the show.

Burns graduated from the George Washington University in 1924, receiving both his bachelor's and law degrees. He was a member of the Alpha chapter of Phi Alpha, which later merged into Zeta Beta Tau.

== Career ==
Burns became a corporate attorney. In the legal field, he was vice chairman of the Committee on Character and Fitness of the Appellate Division of the Supreme Court of the State of New York, first Judicial Department. For many years, he was a director of the New York County Lawyers' Association, which awarded him its Medal for Conspicuous Service. He was chairman of the Joint Coordinating Committee on Discipline of the Association of the Bar of the City of New York and a member of the House of Delegates of the New York State Bar Association.

Burns was a founder and, for several years, chairman of the board of U.S. Vitamin and Pharmaceutical Corp. He was a founding director of the Sy Syms School of Business.

== Honors ==
In 1984, Yeshiva conferred upon him the honorary degree of Doctor of Humane Letters. In 1970, Burns received an honorary Doctor of Laws degree from the George Washington University Law School, from which he had graduated in 1924. In 1967, the George Washington University Law School finished constructing the Jacob Burns Law Library, with Burns as its namesake. The George Washington University Law Association presented him with its Distinguished Alumnus Award in 1975. He also received the Alumni Achievement Award in 1983 from the university's General Alumni Association. He was a member of the Alpha chapter of Phi Alpha at GW and a long-standing member of the Board of Directors of the national fraternity. In April 1959, Phi Alpha fraternity merged with Phi Sigma Delta, and in 1969–70, Phi Sigma Delta merged into Zeta Beta Tau. Mr. Burns served as a Director of the Zeta Beta Tau Foundation from December 18, 1970 - December 31, 1972.

== Personal life ==
Burns married Faye Himmelstein. They had a son, George, and a daughter, Rosalie.

Burns was a philanthropic leader in a broad spectrum of institutions that promoted the advancement of learning and the arts, including the Metropolitan Opera Association, Thirteen (WNET), and Hillel: The Foundation for Jewish Campus Life. The Jacob Burns Foundation, which he founded in 1959, has given away millions of dollars to not-for-profit organizations in the U.S. The foundation continues his legacy today, providing grants to projects such as the Jacob Burns Film Center in Pleasantville, New York.

Burns served on the board of trustees of Yeshiva University and was a trustee at George Washington University. He was board chairman emeritus the Benjamin N. Cardozo School of Law at Yeshiva. He was a member of the Order of the Coif for more than six decades. He was a long-standing member of the Board of Directors of Phi Alpha; when the fraternity merged into Zeta Beta Tau, Burns served as a director of the Zeta Beta Tau Foundation.

Burns died of heart failure in his home in Atlantic Beach, New York, in 1993.
