= Shaista Khilji =

Academic Researcher

Shaista E. Khilji
- Occupations: Academic, researcher, and author

Academic background
- Education: M.Phil, Cantab (1995); Ph.D., Cantab (2001)
- Alma mater: University of the Punjab; Quaid-i-Azam University; University of Cambridge

Academic work
- Institutions: George Washington University

Shaista E. Khilji is an American academic, researcher, and author. She is a Professor of Human and Organizational Learning & International Affairs at the George Washington University, where from 2018 to 2022 she served as a Faculty Senator, and a member of Faculty Senate Executive Committee. She is the Founding Editor-in-Chief of South Asia Journal of Business Studies.

By training, Khilji is an organizational scientist. Her research is focused on leadership, change, cross cultural management. Much of her research has dealt with the topic of globalization and how it impacts societies and organizations around the world. Overall her research indicates global leadership crises as one of the contributing factors to rising levels of global inequalities. She proposes humanistic leadership as a possible solution to it. Together with Randall Schuler and Ibraize Tarique, she helped establish the field of Macro Talent Management.

Her most recent work focuses on the intersection of artificial intelligence and society, particularly AI's impact on work and organizations. She blogs on Medium and Substack

== Early life and education ==
Khilji was born and raised in Pakistan. She received her B.Sc. from University of the Punjab in 1990 and her MPA from Quaid-i-Azam University in 1993. She then moved to the United Kingdom where she completed her MPhil in 1995 and her PhD in 2001, both from the University of Cambridge.

== Career ==
After completing her Ph.D., Khilji moved to Canada where she joined McGill University and then Carleton University as an Assistant Professor of Management and Strategy. In 2003, she moved to the United States, where she began teaching at the American University. In 2005, she joined The George Washington University as an Assistant Professor of Human and Organizational Studies, becoming Associate Professor in 2007 and a Full Professor in 2013. At GW, in 2015, she launched a Master's program in Organizational Leadership & Learning (OLL) in on-campus and online formats. Khilji stepped down as the Program Director in 2021. In 2018, she became interested in humanistic leadership and humanizing leadership education. This led her to launch The Humanizing Initiative in 2020 – that seeks to humanize leadership and organizations, as well as cultivate humanistic leadership.

Khilji founded the South Asian Journal of Business Studies to expand the scope of international business theory. This Journal has helped highlight and promote South Asian business practices and research.

== Research and work ==
Throughout her academic career, Khilji has been involved in organizational research. Her research has focused on the fields of international human resource management (IHRM), cross-cultural management, globalization, gender, talent management, grand challenges, and humanistic leadership.

=== International Management Issues in Different Countries ===
In 2004/2005, Khilji became interested in understanding the high failure rates among biotech firms. This topic introduced her to a new stream of literature, Technology and Innovation Management (TIM). Funded by the Center of Information Technology and the Global Economy at American University, Tomasz Mroczkowski and Khilji conducted an exploratory analysis of a small sample of Maryland-based biotech firms. The results of this research were published in the Journal of Product Innovation Management. Subsequently, she expanded the scope of this work to focus on Poland and India. This TIM study identified several paradoxes associated with managing innovation in the biotech industry and led to the development of an “Integrated Innovation” model, which has been used by other scholars to study the biotech industry.

Khilji's interest in strategic human resource management (SHRM) in Asia led to a collaboration with Xiaoyun Wang and Kun Qiao to study the use of high-performance work practices in China. An associated article was published in the International Journal of Human Resource Management in 2009.

In collaboration with a number of scholars from Ben Gurion University, Lahore University of Management Sciences and XLRRI, Khilji also conducted a cross-cultural study of impression-management (IM) strategies used by urban professionals in the Middle East and South Asia. This work was published in International Business Review in 2010.

In collaboration with Liz Davis and Maria Cseh, Khilji undertook a study of global leadership in the USA. Instead of focusing solely on large business corporations, GLM is derived from an analysis of in-depth interviews with multi-sector global leaders, including the federal government, international aid agencies, and the not-for-profit sector. The findings of this research were presented at the International Leadership Association Conference (2008), and the Academy of Management Conference (2010). This research was also published in the form of one journal article and one chapter in Advances in International Management: The Past, Present, and Future of International Business and Management.

=== Globalization, Change and Learning in South Asia ===
Between 2012 and 2017, Khilji's work was aimed at extending the "East meets West" debate in international business (IB) literature. In 2012, she founded the South Asian Journal of Business Studies (formerly the South Asian Journal of Global Business Research) through Emerald Publications. The journal provides a platform showcasing practice, policy and strategy in South Asian business and management and the region's impact on the global business ecosystem. Thus makes an important contribution to advancing international business theory and practice. The Journal has a cite score of 1.3 in 2019, and 2.3 in 2020.

In 2013, Khilji published a book (with Chris Rowley) entitled, Globalization, Change and Learning in South Asia. Between 2014 and 2017, Khilji served as the Co-PI of a US$1 million project that focused on women's empowerment in Pakistan, by building academic partnerships and creating people-to-people ties. She collaborated with Lahore College of Women's University to work on their Master's and Ph.D. programs through faculty development and student exchanges.

=== Macro & Global Talent Management ===
In 2014, Khilji became interested in global talent shortages that brought new urgency to the concept of global talent management. In 2012, she worked with Randall Schuler and Ibraize Tarique to develop a conceptual framework for global talent management, which incorporates a macro view and supports interdisciplinary research. The framework draws attention to the context in which GTM occurs as well as discusses its multiple consequences traversing levels of analysis. This article was published in 2015 in Human Resource Management Review.

=== Humanizing Leadership & Organizations ===
Some of her recent work focuses on highlighting and addressing socio-economic inequalities within organizations, and building inclusive communities. She uses humanizing principles as the foundation of her work. In 2021, she published a paper in the Journal of Management Education. In this paper, she proposed an approach for humanizing leadership using the case example of George Washington University’s Organizational Leadership & Learning (OLL) program.

== Awards and honors ==
2026 Northeastern Association of Graduate Schools Faculty Teaching Award (Doctoral Level)

- 2026 Recipient of the Oscar and Shoshana Trachtenberg Service Award, George Washington University
- 2025 Recipient of the Morton A Bender Teaching Award, George Washington University*1996 - Honorary Lifetime Fellow of Cambridge Commonwealth Society
- 2014 - VALOR (Veterans Accelerate Learning Opportunities and Rewards) Excellence Award for demonstrating excellence in learning and service at GW
- 2008 - Outstanding Service Award as an International Membership Involvement Representative for International Management Division, Academy of Management

== Books edited ==
- Khilji, S.E., & Rowley, C. (2013). Globalization, Change and Learning in South Asia.

== Selected articles ==
- Khilji, S.E. (2021). Making Sense of the Individual Lived Experiences in the United States: An "Engaged" View of Inequalities. Diversity, Equality, and Inclusion.
- Khilji, S.E., (2021). An approach to humanizing leadership education: Building a learning community and stakeholder engagement, Journal of Management Education.
- Khilji, S.E., & List, C. (2021). Humanizing to address the grand challenge of rising inequalities: leadership in a post-COVID world. Academia Letter, Academia.
