= Thomas Sewall =

American physician (1786–1845)

- Born: November 16, 1786; Hallowell, Massachusetts, U.S.
- Died: April 10, 1845 (aged 58); Washington, D.C., U.S.
- Resting place: Oak Hill Cemetery; Washington, D.C., U.S.
- Education: Harvard Medical School
- Occupations: Physician; educator
- Spouse: Mary Choates
- Children: 1

Thomas Sewall (April 16, 1786 – April 10, 1845) was an American medical doctor, writer and academic. He gained notoriety for being convicted of body snatching, and later went on to become a professor.

== Early life ==
Thomas Sewall was born on April 16, 1786, in Hallowell, Maine. In August 1812, he graduated from Harvard Medical School and began practicing medicine.

== Career ==
Sewall commenced his medical practice in Ipswich, Massachusetts. In 1819, he was arrested, charged, and found guilty of multiple counts of body snatching in Ipswich. Forced to leave the state, he moved to Washington, D.C. around 1820 to re-establish his career. In 1821, Sewall was appointed a professor of anatomy and physiology, as well as doctor at Columbian College (which later became George Washington University). In 1825, the college began its operations and he remained with the college until his death.

In 1828, Sewall became a professor of religion and joined the Methodist Episcopal Church. In 1834, Sewall served as manager of the American Colonization Society. In May 1841, Sewall was appointed by President John Tyler as inspector of the Penitentiary in Washington, D.C.

Sewell is remembered today for his eight graphic drawings of "alcohol diseased stomachs". Colored lithographs of these were made and widely distributed to promote teetotalism and the temperance movement. He was also an opponent of phrenology, the pseudo-science of studying the size and shape of peoples' heads.

== Personal life ==
Sewall married Mary Choate, sister of Rufus Choate from Massachusetts. They had at least one son, Thomas Sewall. Thomas Sewall was a Methodist reverend of Brooklyn and Baltimore.

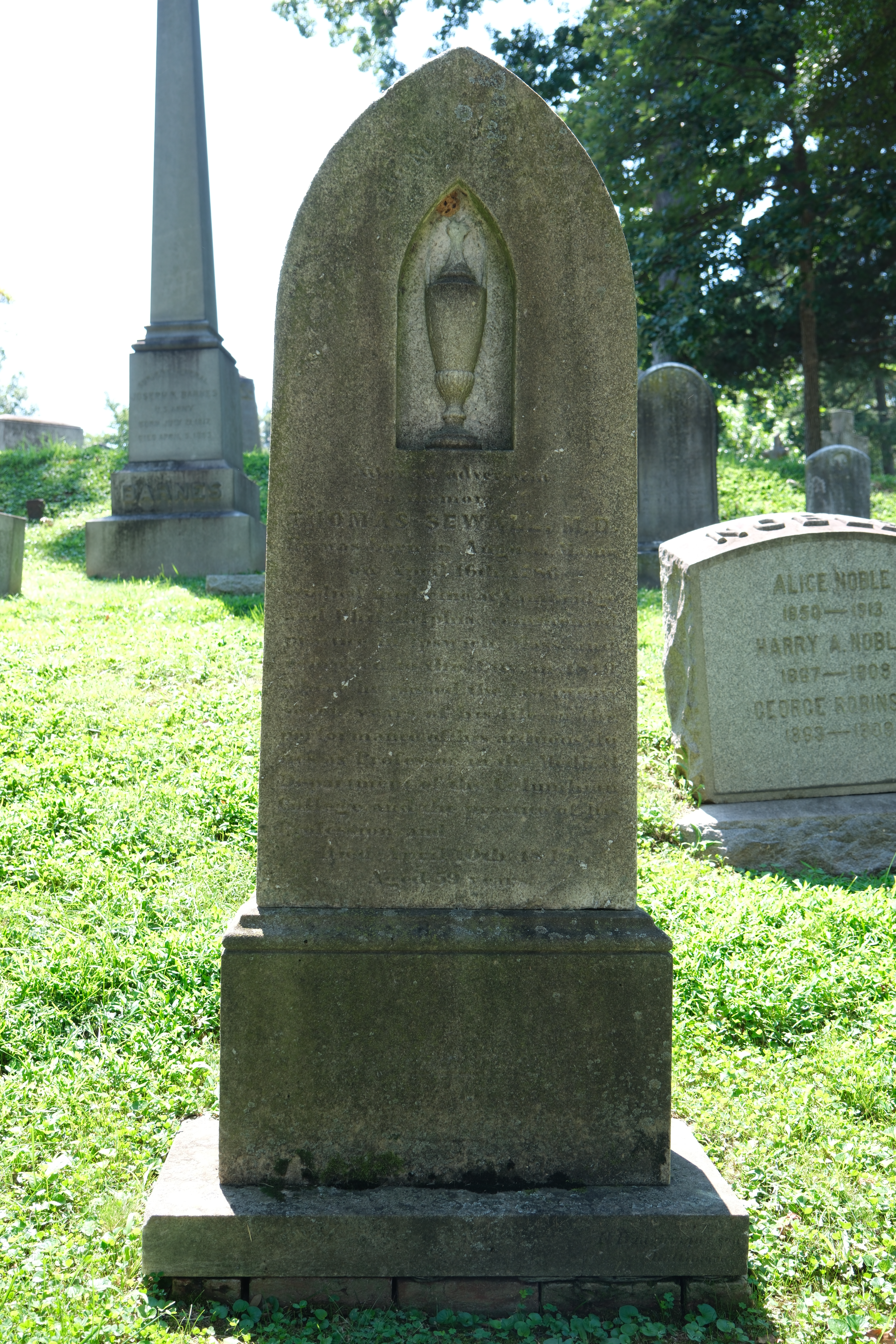
Grave of Sewall at Oak Hill Cemetery

Sewall died on April 10, 1845, at his house in Washington, D.C. He was buried at Oak Hill Cemetery in Washington, D.C.

== Sources ==
- Hanson, David J. Preventing Alcohol Abuse: Alcohol, Culture, and Control. Wetport, CT: Praeger, 1995.
- A most daring and sacrilegious robbery" The extraordinary story of body snatching at Chebacco Parish in Ipswich, Massachusetts by Christopher Benedetto. New England Ancestors magazine, 2005 (Spring), 6 (2), p. 31.
