= Noam Pianko =

American academic

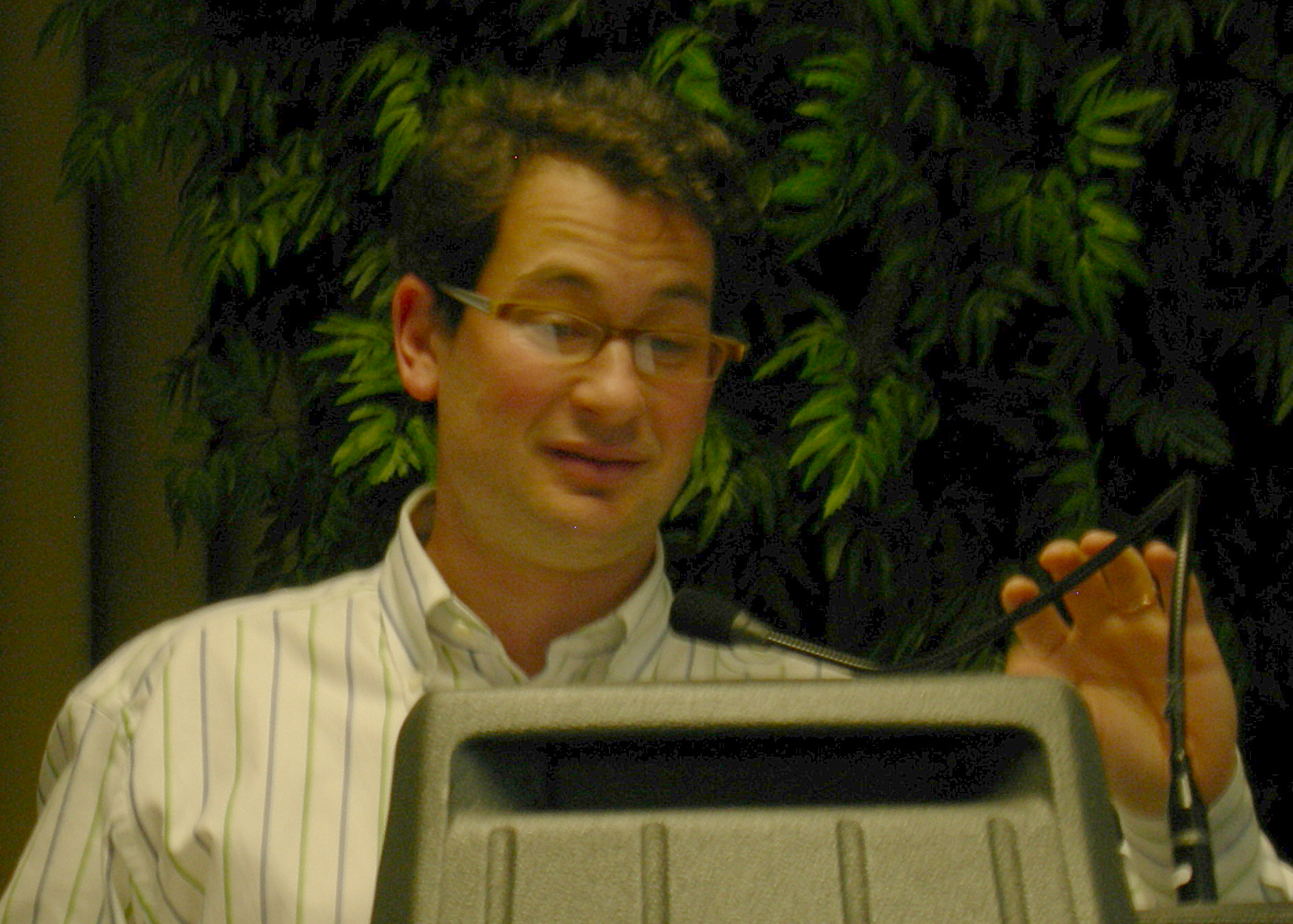
Noam Pianko in 2007

Noam F. Pianko is an American academic. He is the Samuel N. Stroum Chair of Jewish Studies and the Herbert and Lucy Pruzan Professor of Jewish Studies at the Henry M. Jackson School of International Studies of the University of Washington.

Pianko obtained his PhD at Yale University, writing his dissertation on Simon Rawidowicz, Mordecai Kaplan, and Hans Kohn. He has also written Jewish Peoplehood: An American Innovation (Rutgers University Press, 2015).

Pianko served as president of the Association for Jewish Studies from 2019 to 2021, when he resigned after receiving criticism for participating in a Zoom meeting with Steven M. Cohen, who had been accused of sexual harassment.
