= Jacob Burns Law Library =

Coordinates: 38°53′56″N 77°2′43″W

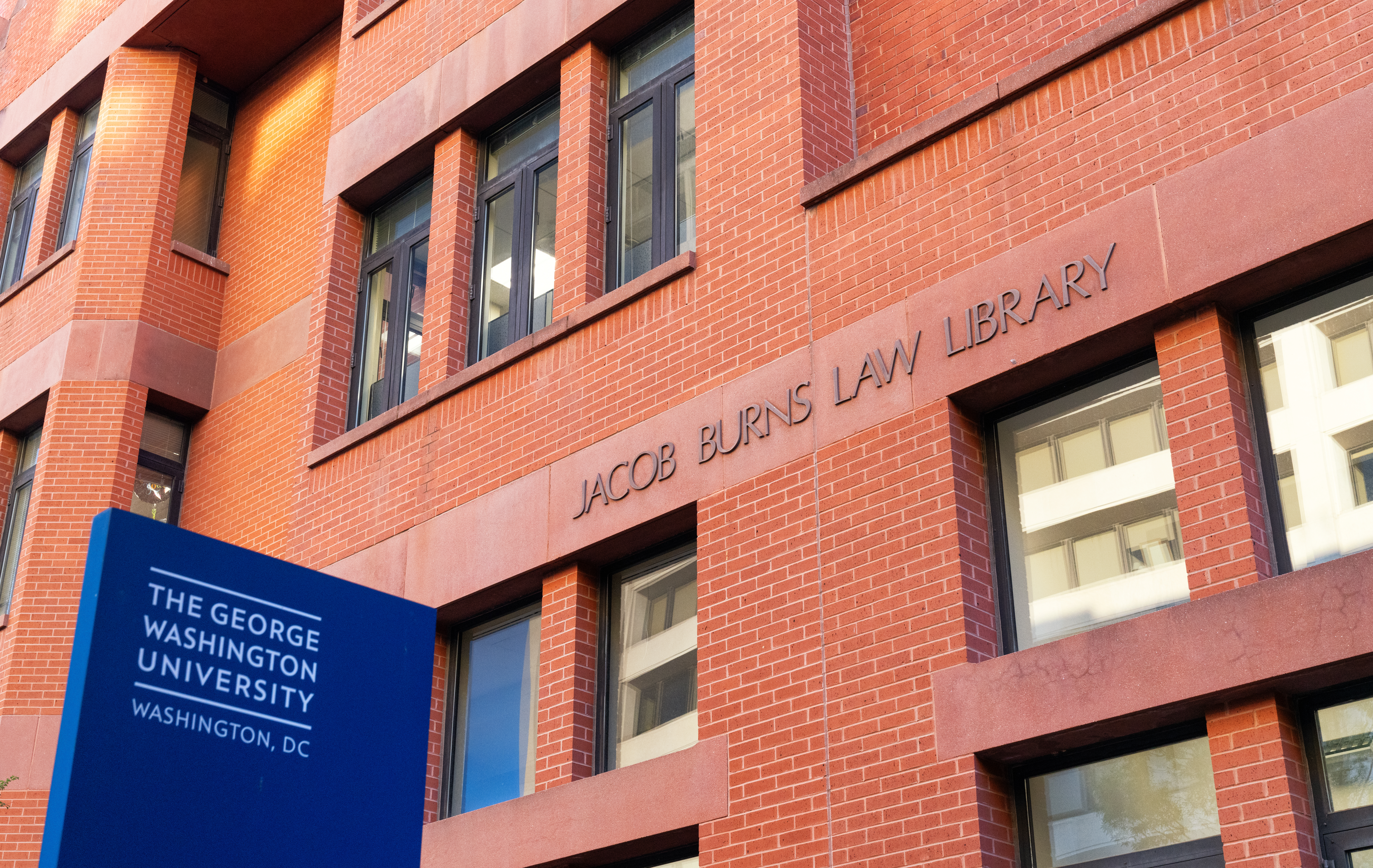
Jacob Burns Law Library in 2024

The Jacob Burns Law Library is the library of the George Washington University Law School. The library was completed in September 1967. The library was named with a gift from Jacob Burns, who earned his law degree in 1924.

The library is a part of the George Washington University Law School Complex, and adjoins Stockton Hall to the north. According to the school's website, the library contains over 700,000 volumes.
