= Journal of Exposure Science and Environmental Epidemiology =

- Discipline: Environmental toxicology, environmental health
- Language: English
- Edited by: Elaine A. Cohen Hubal

Publication details
- Former name(s): Journal of Exposure Analysis and Environmental Epidemiology
- History: 1991-present
- Publisher: Springer Nature
- Frequency: 6 issues per year
- Impact factor: 5.563 (2020)

Standard abbreviations
- ISO 4: J. Expo. Sci. Environ. Epidemiol.

Indexing
- CODEN: JESEBS
- ISSN: 1559-0631 (print); 1559-064X (web)
- LCCN: 2005216278
- OCLC no.: 62348143

Links
- Journal homepage; Online archive

The Journal of Exposure Science and Environmental Epidemiology (JESEE) is a peer-reviewed scientific journal focused on exposure science for professionals in a wide range of environmental and public health disciplines. It was established in 1991 as the Journal of Exposure Analysis and Environmental Epidemiology and obtained its current name in 2006. It is the official journal of the International Society of Exposure Science (ISES). It is published in 6 issues per year in print and online by Springer Nature and the editor-in-chief is Elaine A. Cohen Hubal. According to the Journal Citation Reports, the journal has a 2020 impact factor of 5.563, ranking it 56th out of 274 in the category Environmental Sciences.
