= Laura Robson (historian) =

American historian

Laura Robson is a historian and professor at Yale University. Her work focuses on the modern history of the Middle East and on global histories of displacement.

== Works ==
- Robson, Laura (2011). Colonialism and Christianity in Mandate Palestine. University of Texas Press. ISBN 978-0-292-72653-6.
- Robson, Laura (2017). States of Separation: Transfer, Partition, and the Making of the Modern Middle East. University of California Press. ISBN 978-0-520-96566-9.
- Dubnov, Arie M.; Robson, Laura, eds. (2019). Partitions: A Transnational History of Twentieth-Century Territorial Separatism. Stanford University Press. ISBN 978-1-5036-0768-2.
- Robson, Laura (2020). The Politics of Mass Violence in the Middle East. Oxford University Press. ISBN 978-0-19-255858-9.
- Robson, Laura (2023). Human Capital: A History of Putting Refugees to Work. Verso. ISBN 9781804290217.
- Robson, Laura, and Joseph Maiolo (2025). The League of Nations. Cambridge University Press. ISBN 9781009514149.
