= George Washington University Virginia Science and Technology Campus =

Campus of George Washington University

Coordinates: 39°3′30.3″N 77°26′35.5″W

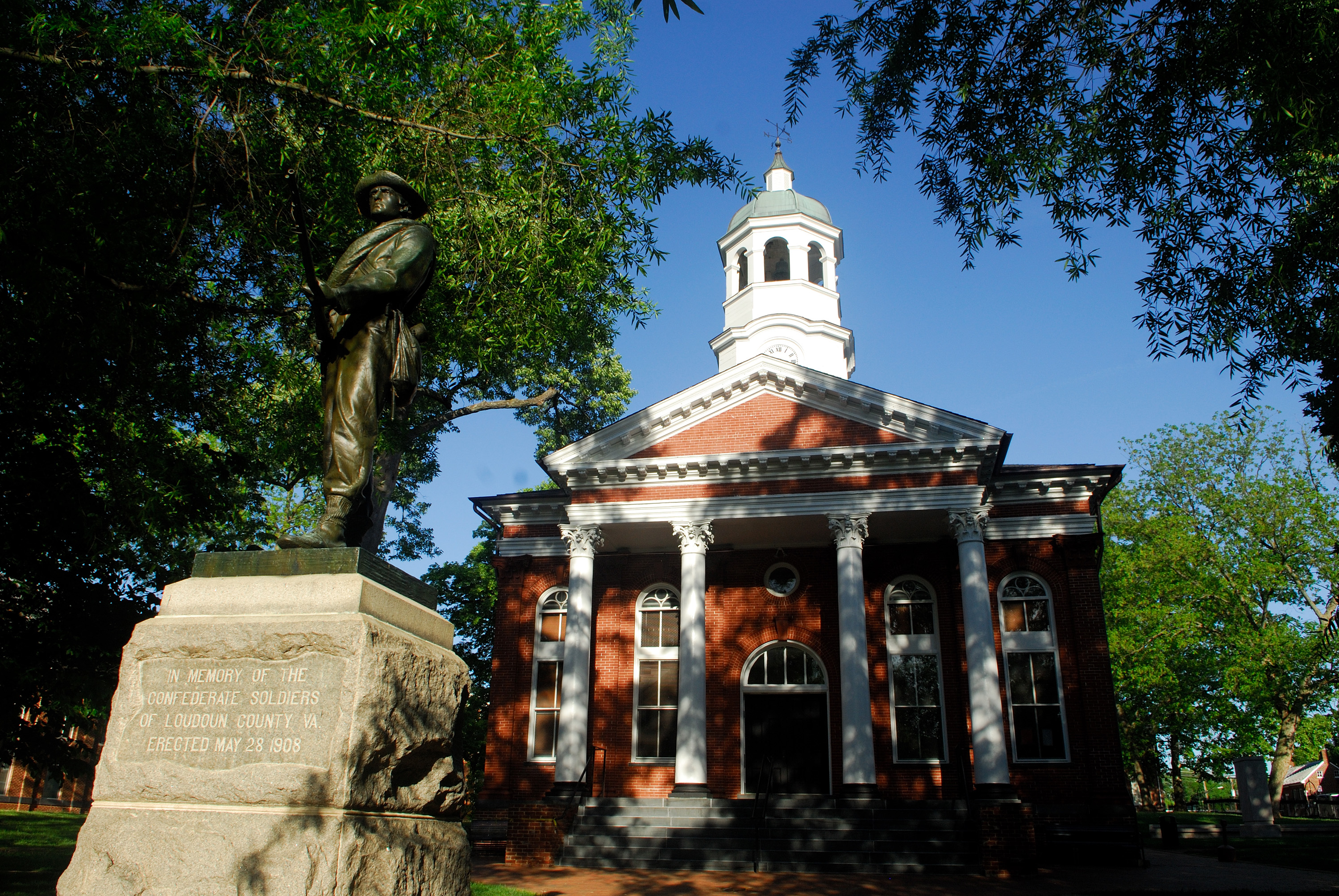
Loudoun County, Virginia

George Washington University Virginia Science and Technology Campus is the campus of George Washington University in the Ashburn area of unincorporated Loudoun County, Virginia, United States. It was launched in 1991, thanks to the generosity of GW Trustee Emeritus and local philanthropist Robert H. Smith and to the vision of President Emeritus Stephen J. Trachtenberg. Today, the campus supports innovative research in engineering, physics, and chemistry and is home to academic programs and critical administrative services.

In February 2026, the university sold the campus to Amazon Data Services, which plans to develop a data center on the land, for $427 million. The contract allows the university to remain on the property for up to five years to allow programs to relocate.

== Research centers on campus ==
- Earthquake Engineering and Structures Laboratory
- Energy Research Laboratories
- High Performance Computing Laboratory (HPCL)
- Center for Intelligent Systems Research (CISR)
- National Crash Analysis Center (NCAC)
- Center for Nuclear Studies - Data Analysis Research Center
- Pharmacogenomics/Health Sciences Laboratory
- Center for the Study of Learning (CSL)

== Academic programs on campus ==
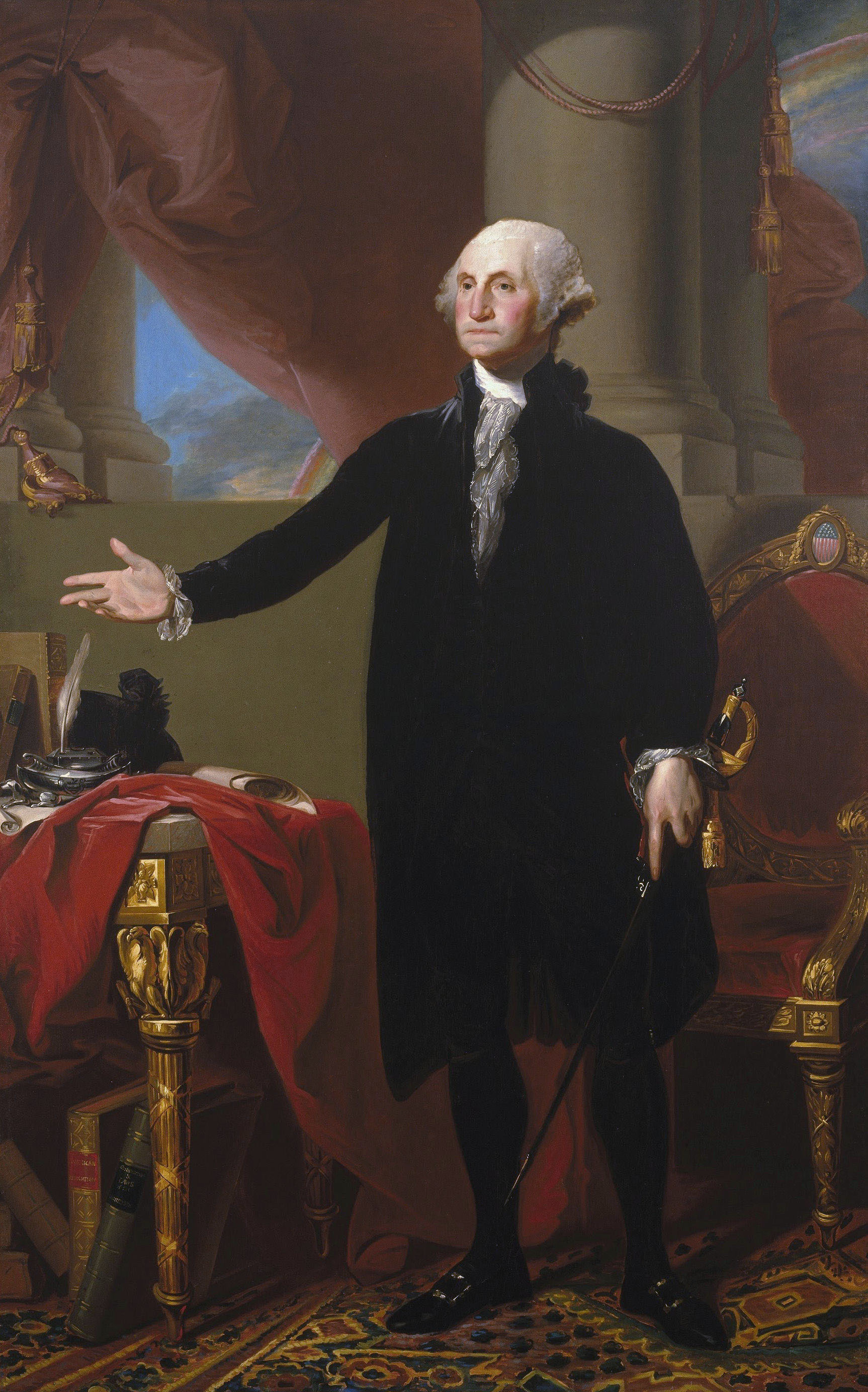
In his will, George Washington wanted the University to benefit his home state of Virginia as well as the federal district

There are currently 20 degree and certificate programs being offered on this campus. Programs are available in person, online, or hybrid form.

=== Business ===
- Information Systems Technology, Executive M.S.
- Information Systems Technology, M.S.
- Business Administration, M.B.A.
- Project Management, M.S.
- Tourism Administration, M.T.A.

=== Education ===
- Educational Administration and Policy Studies, Ed.D.
- Educational Leadership and Administration, M.A., Ed.S., certificate
- Global Leadership in Teams and Organizations, Graduate Certificate
- Human and Organizational Learning, Executive Leadership, Ed.D.
- Leadership Development, Graduate Certificate

=== Engineering ===
- Computer Science, M.S.
- Cybersecurity in Computer Science, M.S.
- Electrical Engineering, M.S.
- Engineering Management/Systems Engineering, Ph.D.
- Systems Engineering, M.S.
- Telecommunications Engineering, M.S.
- Computer Security and Information Assurance, Graduate Certificate

=== Health sciences ===
- Health Sciences, B.S. (Pharmacogenomics)
- Translational Health Sciences, Ph.D. (Hybrid)

=== Integrated Information, Science, and Technology ===
- Bachelor's Degree Program in Integrated Information, Science, and Technology

=== Justice and Public Safety Information Management ===
- Justice and Public Safety Information Management, Graduate Certificate

=== Nursing ===
- Nursing, B.S.N., Second Degree
- Adult, Family, Advanced Family, and Palliative Care Nurse Practitioners, Graduate Certificates (post-masters)
- Health Care Quality for Health Care Providers, Graduate Certificate
- Nursing, D.N.P.
- Nursing, M.S.N. (Adult Practitioner, Clinical Research Administration, Family Nurse Practitioner, Health Care Quality, and Nursing Leadership and Management)

== Library ==
The Virginia Science and Technology Campus Library serves the GW community, including current students, faculty, staff and alumni. Access is also granted to GW affiliated universities, schools and organizations and members of the public using the Foundation Center Collection.
