= F Street House =

Historic house in Washington, D.C., United States

- U.S. National Register of Historic Places
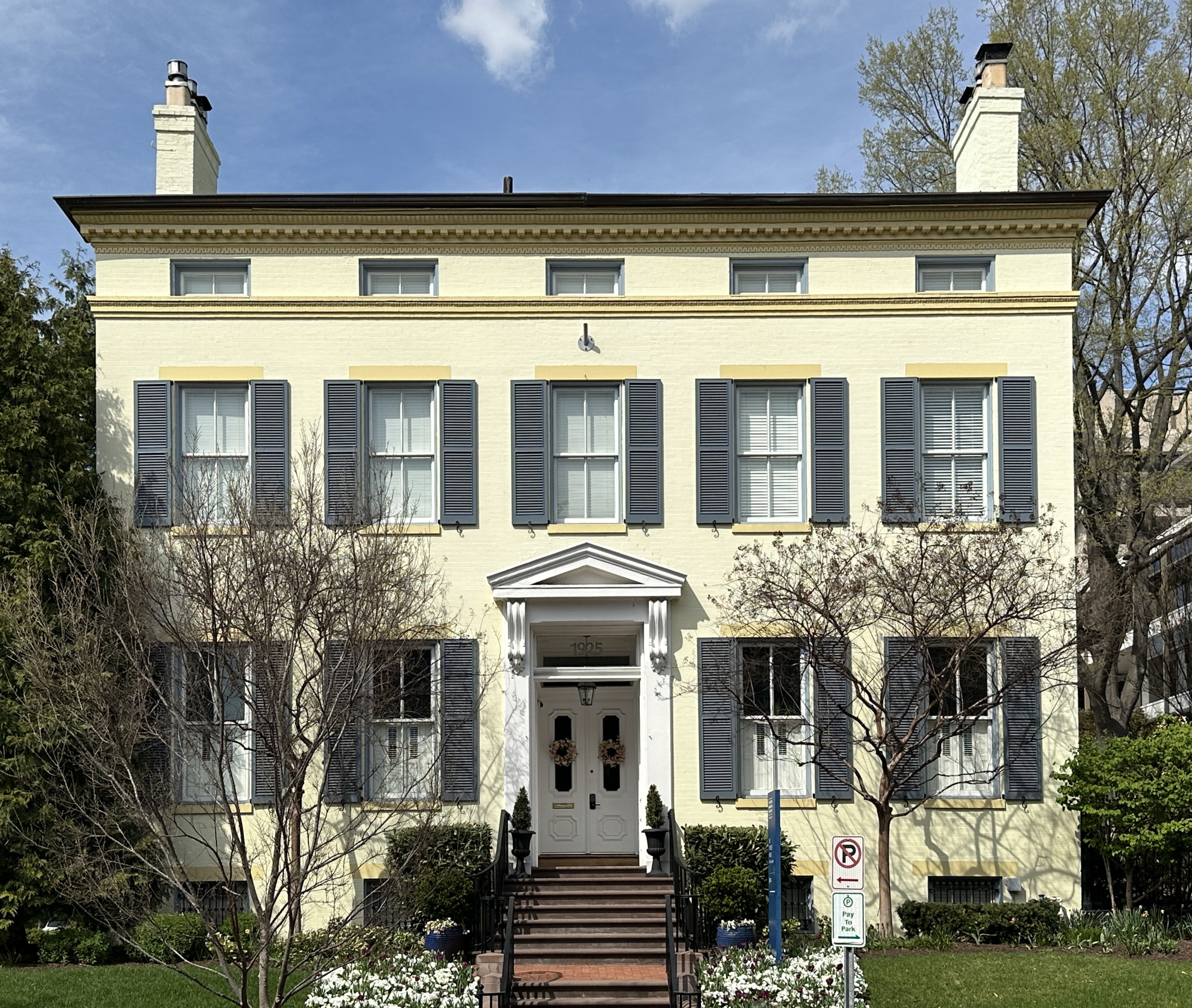
- F Street House in 2026

- Location within Central Washington, D.C. Location within the District of Columbia Location within the United States
- Location: 1925 F Street, NW; Washington, D.C.
- Coordinates: 38°53′50″N 77°2′42″W
- Built: 1849
- Architectural style: Greek Revival
- NRHP reference No.: 90001376
- Added to NRHP: September 21, 1990

The F Street House is a historic 19th-century mansion in Washington, D.C., blocks away from the White House, that serves as the official residence of the President of the George Washington University. It is a registered landmark on the National Register of Historic Places and was previously known as the Steedman-Ray House, Alexander Ray House, and as the F Street Club.

== History ==
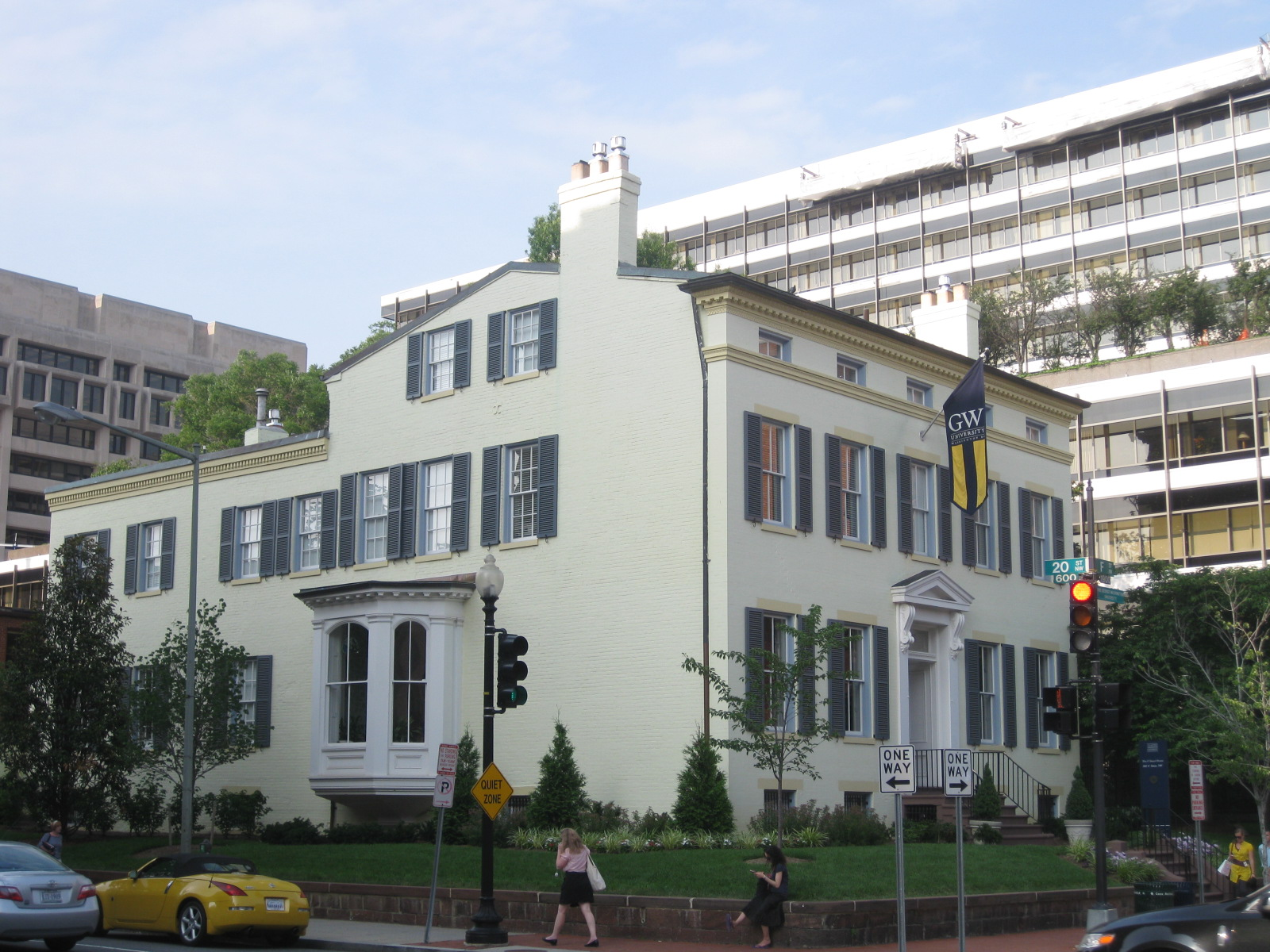
The F Street House with the headquarters of the International Monetary Fund (IMF) behind it.

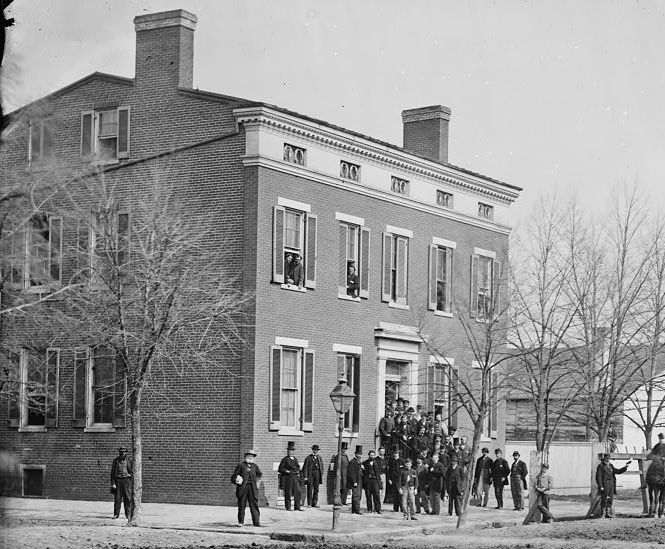
The mansion, circa 1865.

The Greek Revival building was constructed for U.S. Navy Captain Alexander Ray (1799–1878) in 1849.

It was purchased by American University in 1920 and served as the "Downtown Campus" for many years. Laura Curtis, wife of New York lawyer James Freeman Curtis, rented the home in the 1920s.

In 1935, the 1925 F Street Club, Inc. purchased the property and operated a private members' club from the building, started by Laura M. Gross. The Club counted many well known and influential men as regular guests, including Presidents Harry Truman, John F. Kennedy, George H. W. Bush and members of their respective Administrations. The Clubhouse's popularity was boosted by being only a few blocks away from the White House.

The Clubhouse also served as a popular meeting place of the East Coast elite (in particular those who held powerful positions in the C.I.A. and the Department of State); and who hold informal meetings at the club. It was once labelled as "...the most difficult door to open in Washington D.C.". Indeed, the club was so exclusive that not even its members knew exactly who else belonged entirely. It was the place where men of power and influence dined, drank and socialized as they charted America's course according to Collier Magazine.

It was managed by a Board of Directors consisting of ten members. They were the "Old Guard," from prominent Washington, D.C., families who carefully guarded all operational aspects of the club.

=== Contemporary ===
The club hosted members of the most prominent families in the United States, as well as senior officials from around Washington, D.C., and beyond including the President of the World Bank Group, The Governor of the Bank of England and the Chairman and CEO of Goldman Sachs.

The membership totaled about 850 socialites from their era according to Richard Casiano, the General Manager from 1982 until his retirement in 1997. Richard was first hired as a bartender on January 1, 1981, and became the General Manager of the club on July 1, 1982.

The Club was operated the same as a well staffed English country manor, which included male staff wearing traditional white-tie uniforms. There was no menu and guests were served whatever was prepared for the day; however, members could order special meals in advance and for their special parties.

The F Street Club closed in 1999.

From 2000 to 2008, the mansion served as the Alumni House of The George Washington University. In July 2008, the Alumni House officially became the official residence of the President of the George Washington University.

== See also ==
- National Register of Historic Places listings in the District of Columbia
