= George Washington University School of Business =

Business school in Washington, D.C., US

Coordinates: 38.9245°N 77.022°W

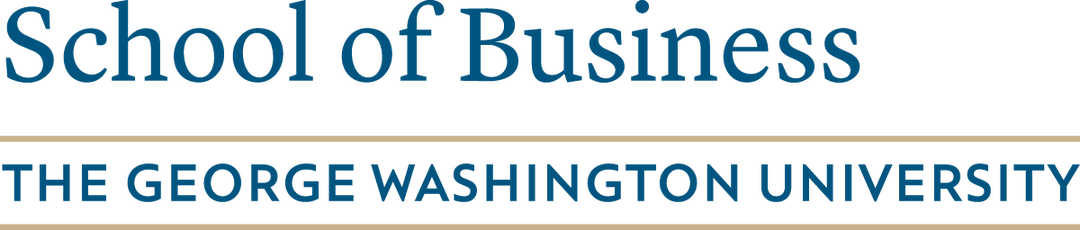
- Motto: Deus Nobis Fiducia
- Type: Private
- Established: 1928
- Parent institution: George Washington University
- Dean: Sevin Yeltekin
- Faculty: 236
- Undergraduates: 1593
- Postgraduates: 1904
- Location: Washington, D.C., 20052
- Campus: Urban—Foggy Bottom
- Website: business.gwu.edu
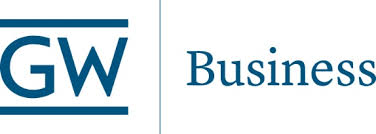

The George Washington University School of Business (known as GW School of Business or GWSB) is the professional business school of George Washington University in Washington, D.C. The GW School of Business is ranked as one of the top business schools in the United States, with globally ranked undergraduate and graduate programs. GW's campus is also adjacent to some of the world's leading financial institutions, including the Federal Reserve, World Bank, and International Monetary Fund.

U.S. News & World Report ranks GWSB's international business program as 4th best in the world, its healthcare MBA as 16th best, its undergraduate business program as 40th best, and its MBA program as 61st best. In 2024, the Financial Times ranks GWSB as the 32nd best business school in the United States. Among the school's alumni are numerous prominent public and business figures, including Lee Kun-hee (Chairman of the Samsung Group), Faure Gnassingbé (current president of Togo), Ted Lerner (owner of the Washington Nationals), Jerry Reinsdorf (owner of the Chicago Bulls and the Chicago White Sox), Peter Pace, former chairman of the Joint Chiefs of Staff, and Ina Garten, celebrity chef and author.

== History ==
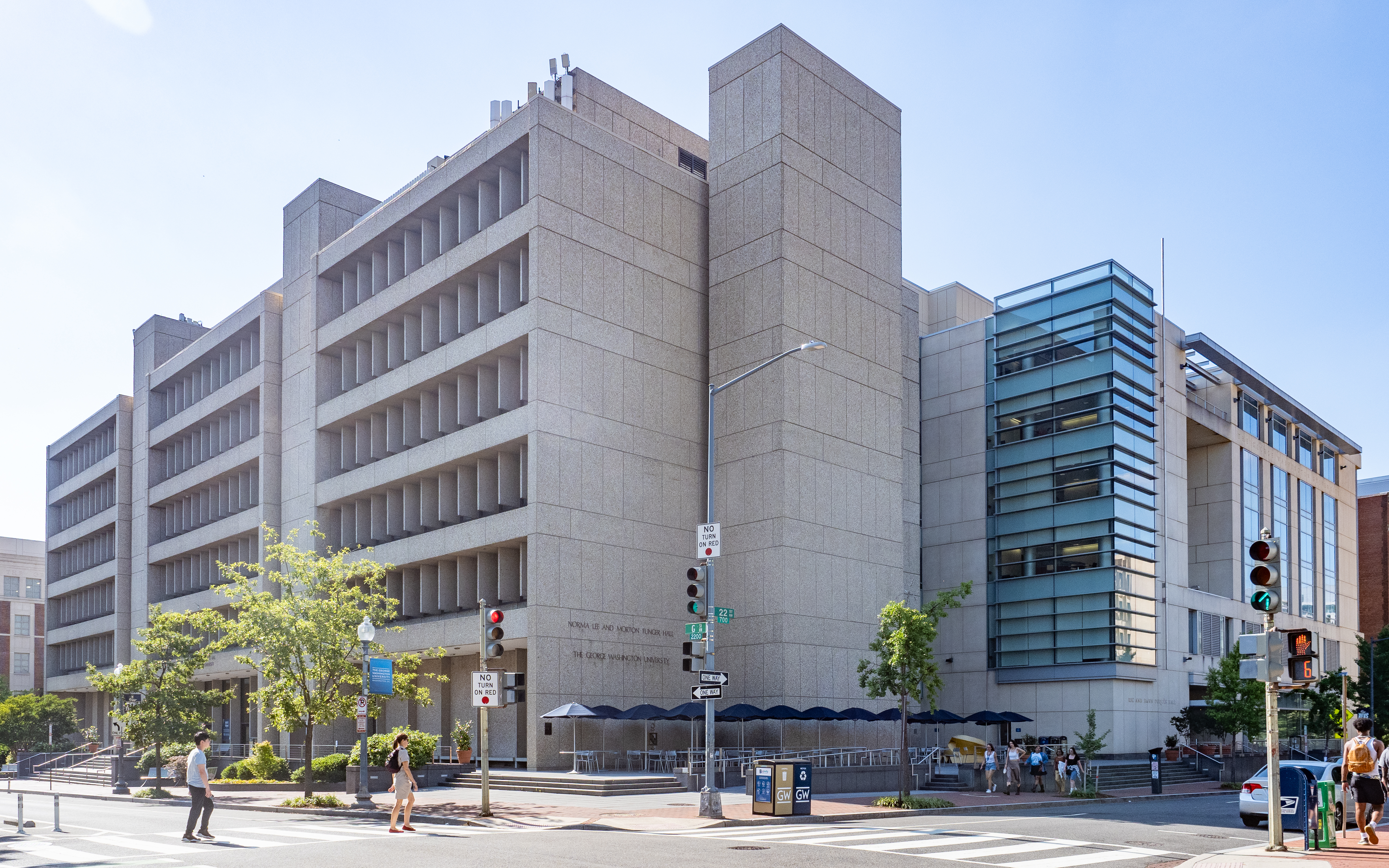
Ric and Dawn Duquès Hall.

In 1928, the school was founded on the idea that business and government might become partners in promoting national prosperity and international development. Beginning with a $1 million endowment from League of Masonic Clubs, GW President Cloyd H. Marvin established what was known as the School of Government, with degree programs that integrated business and politics on the national and international levels.

In 1960, the school was renamed the School of Government, Business, and International Affairs. In 1966, President Lloyd H. Elliott split its faculties into a new School of Government and Business Administration (SGBA) and a School of International Affairs—which today bears President Elliott's name. The SGBA was renamed the School of Business and Public Management in 1990. In 2004, it became the School of Business.

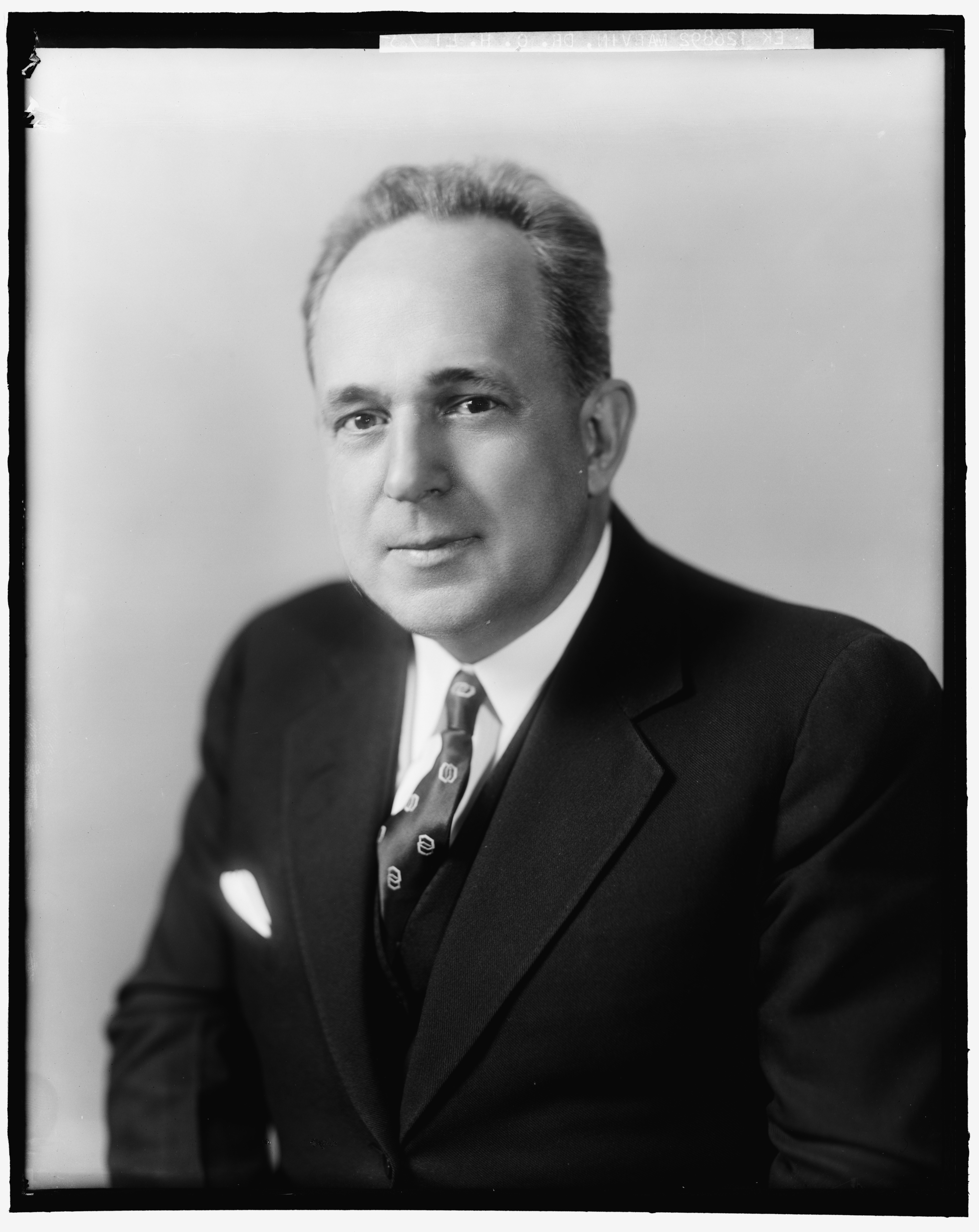
Cloyd H. Marvin

Throughout its history, the GW School of Business has attracted leaders from academia, government, and the business world. In 1992, F. David Fowler, a managing partner of KPMG, became dean of the school. He was succeeded in July 1998 by Susan M. Phillips. A former member of the board of governors of the Federal Reserve System, Dean Phillips brought to the School her expertise in such specializations as derivatives, bank supervision, and financial management.

She was succeeded in August 2010 by Doug Guthrie, whose expertise lies in the fields of leadership and organizational change, corporate governance and corporate social responsibility, and economic reform in China. He was succeeded by Dean Livingstone. During her tenure at GWSB, her research was focused on creativity in business organizations. In April 2017, Livingstone left GWSB in order to become President of Baylor University, and Vivek Choudhury replaced her as the interim Dean. In July 2018, Anuj Mehrotra became GWSB Dean.

In January 2006, the GW School of Business opened its new unified complex, the Ric and Dawn Duquès Hall, which was newly constructed, and the renovated Norma Lee and Morton Funger Hall.

== Academics ==
The school is currently led by Sevin Yeltekin, Ph.D., a distinguished scholar who has published broadly in fiscal policy design, social insurance design, computational economics and asset pricing implications of macro policy. The dean is supported by a wide-ranging advisory board. The school was previously led by Vanessa Perry, M.B.A., Ph.D., professor of marketing, strategic management and public policy who began serving as interim dean on January 1, 2024.

The school consists of various academic departments including: Accountancy, Finance, Information Systems and Technology Management, International Business, Management, Marketing, Strategic Management and Public Policy, Tourism and Hospitality Management, and Decision Sciences.

At the undergraduate level, the school offers eight majors, ten concentrations with the option of an individualized concentration, and eight minors. At the graduate level, the school awards MBAs, specialized master's, and PhD degrees. GWSB also offers different degrees as fully online programs.

The school offers and has offered various other specialized programs and degrees in the past, like part-time and accelerated (one-year) MBAs, specialized MBA programs for law firms or specialized MBAs for athletes.

The school also offers a Global and Experiential Education program (G&EE), providing students with a range of international study and educational options. Female Enrollment at GWSB was at 50% in 2024, up from 40% in 2015.

The GW School of Business is accredited by the Association to Advance Collegiate Schools of Business.

=== Research ===
The GW School of Business is home to various research centers and initiatives:

- Center for Entrepreneurial Excellence (CFEE)
- Center for the Connected Consumer
- Center for International Business Education & Research (GW-CIBER)
- Center for Latin American Issues (CLAI))
- The Institute of Brazilian Issues (IBI)
- Center for Real Estate Studies (CRES)
- The Growth Dialogue
- European Union Research Center (EURC)
- Institute for Corporate Responsibility (ICR)
- International Institute of Tourism Studies (IITS)
- Institute for Integrating Statistics in Decision Sciences
- Korean Management Institute (KMI)
- GW Investment Institute

== Rankings ==
Business school rankings

United States
- Bloomberg MBA: 46

Global
- Financial Times MBA: 58

=== Undergraduate programs ===
- U.S. News & World Report, #38 Undergraduate Business Program, #4 Undergraduate International Business

=== Graduate programs ===
- Bloomberg Businessweek, #46 for Best B-Schools and #3 for diversity in 2023–2024.
- U.S. News & World Report, #12 graduate and #4 undergraduate International Business Program in 2025.
- Financial Times, #32 for US Business Schools and #69 globally in 2024, #1 Worldwide for Percentage of Female Students in Full-Time MBA Programs (2024).
- Princeton Review, #40 for "Top 50 Graduate Schools for Entrepreneurship" in 2025.
- QS World University Rankings, #41 for "QS Global MBA Rankings 2025: United States", #18 for “QS Business Analytics Rankings 2025: United States”, #17 for “QS Management Rankings 2025: United States in 2025.
- Poets & Quants, #40 for "Top 100 U.S. MBA Programs" in 2024–2025.

== Notable people ==
Many of the school's former students have gone on to distinguished careers in both the private and public sectors. Some notable alumni include Raya Haffar al-Hassan (Finance Minister, Lebanon), Kun-Hee Lee (Chairman of Samsung), Darla Moore (Financier and philanthropist), Pedro Heilbron (CEO of Copa Holdings, S.A.), Colin Powell (former US Secretary of State), Ellen Malcolm (Founder of EMILY's List), Peter Pace (former chairman of the Joint Chiefs of Staff), Kent Conrad (U.S. senator from North Dakota), Randall Edwards (Oregon State Treasurer), Shahid Khaqan Abbasi (Prime Minister of Pakistan), Edward M. Liddy (CEO of AIG; former chairman and CEO, Allstate), Ina Garten (Host of Barefoot Contessa), Faure Gnassingbe (President of Togo), Omar Ayub Khan (former Pakistani Minister of State for Finance), Scott Cowen (President of Tulane University), William Dale Montgomery (U.S. ambassador to Bulgaria, Croatia, and Serbia and Montenegro), and Richard Armour (Director of Information Technology, Dell Computer Corporation).

Notable Alumni of the GW School of Business

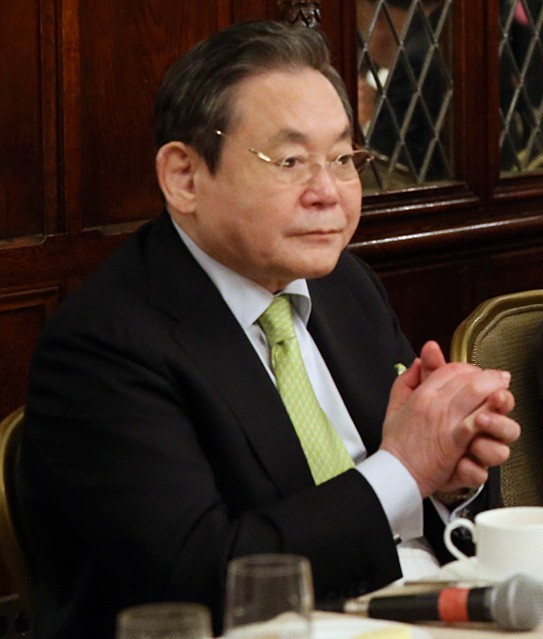
Kun-Hee Lee - chairman of Samsung, Forbes World's Most Powerful People listee

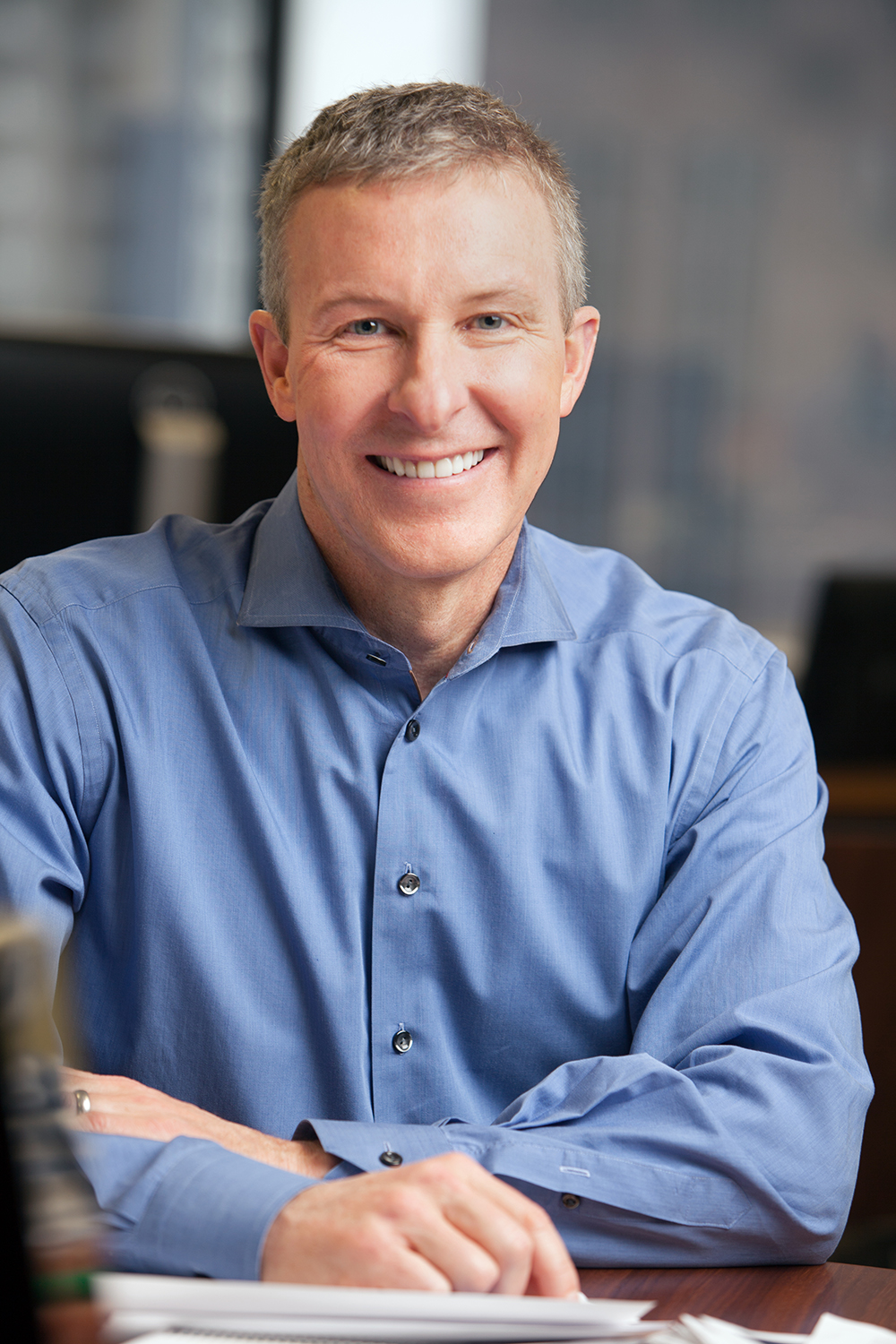
Scott Kirby - CEO of United Airlines

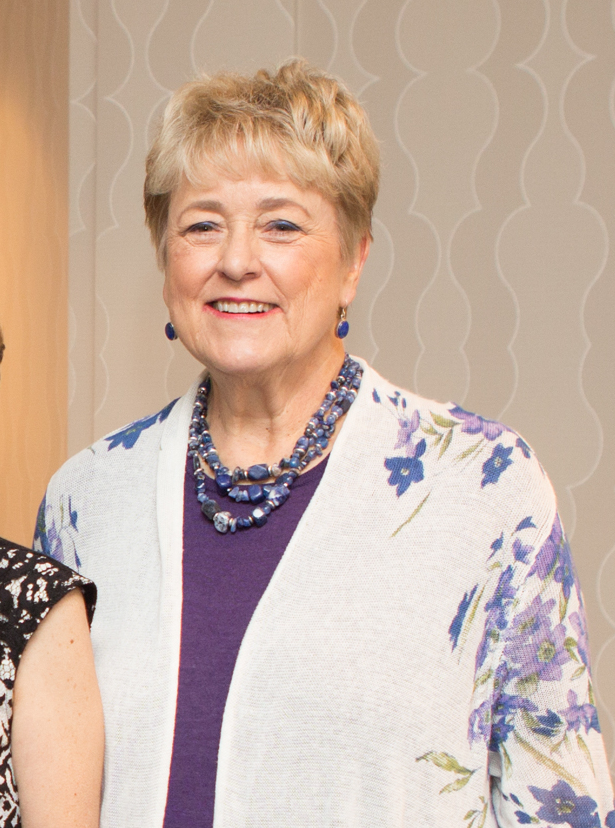
Ellen Malcolm, founder of EMILY's List, IBM heiress

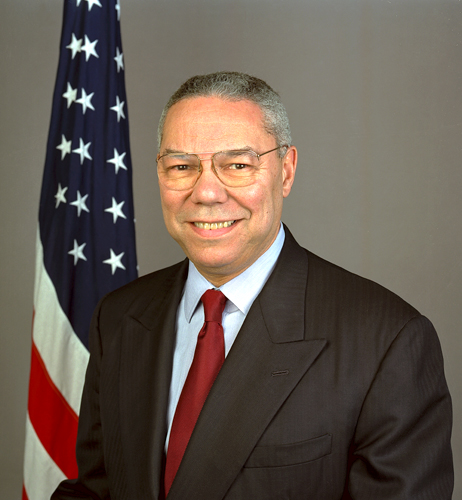
Colin Powell, former U.S. Secretary of State

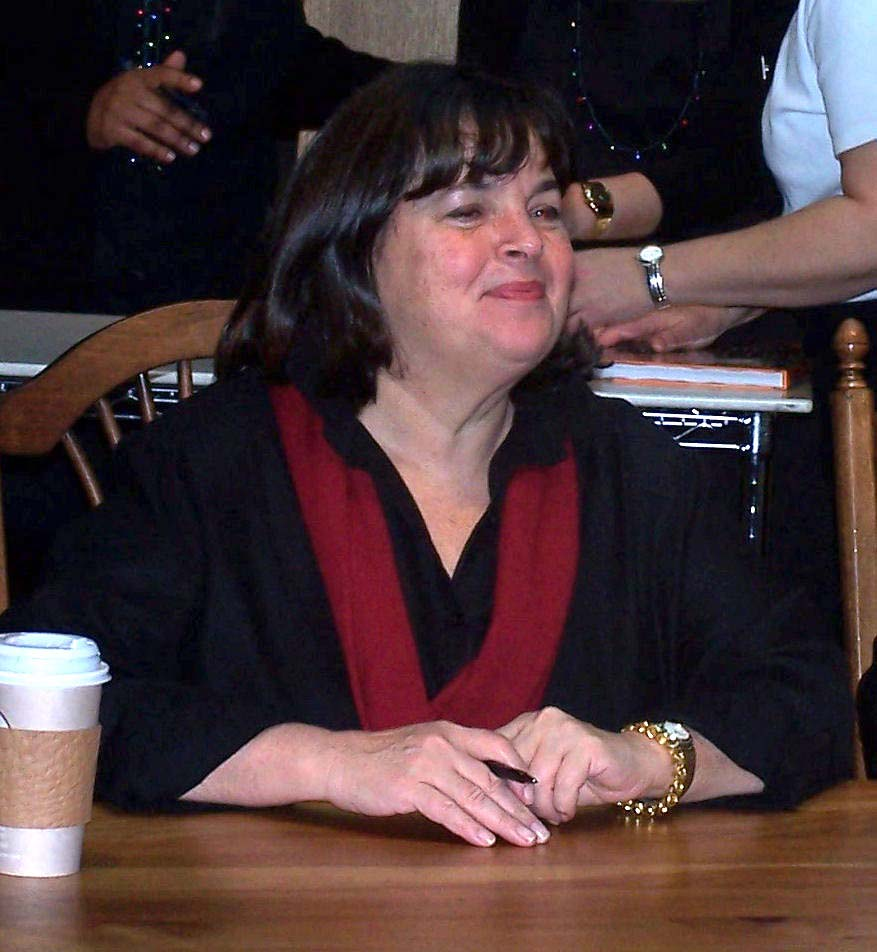
Ina Garten - host of Barefoot Contessa, former White House Office of Management and Budget staffer

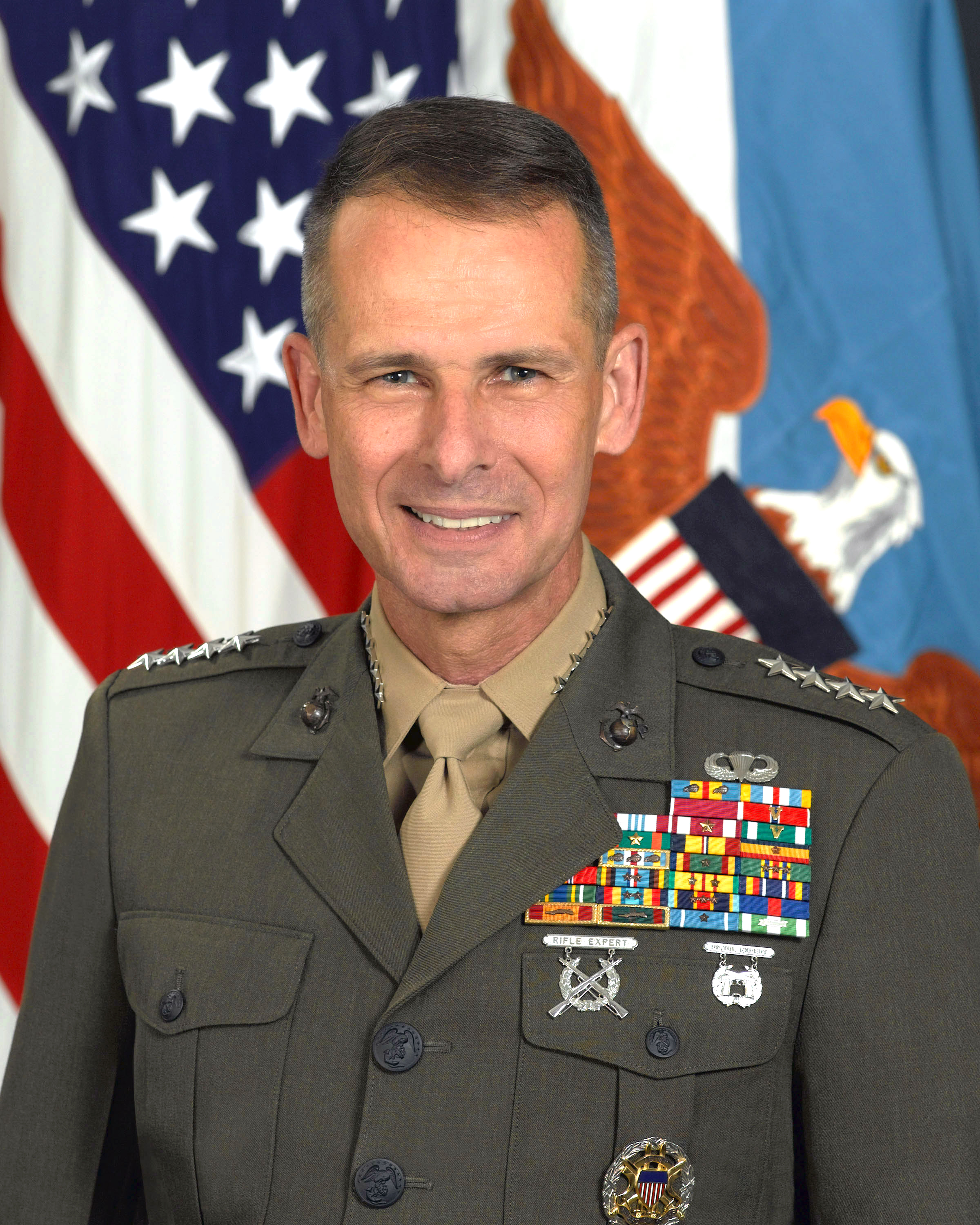
Peter Pace - former chairman of the Joint Chiefs of Staff

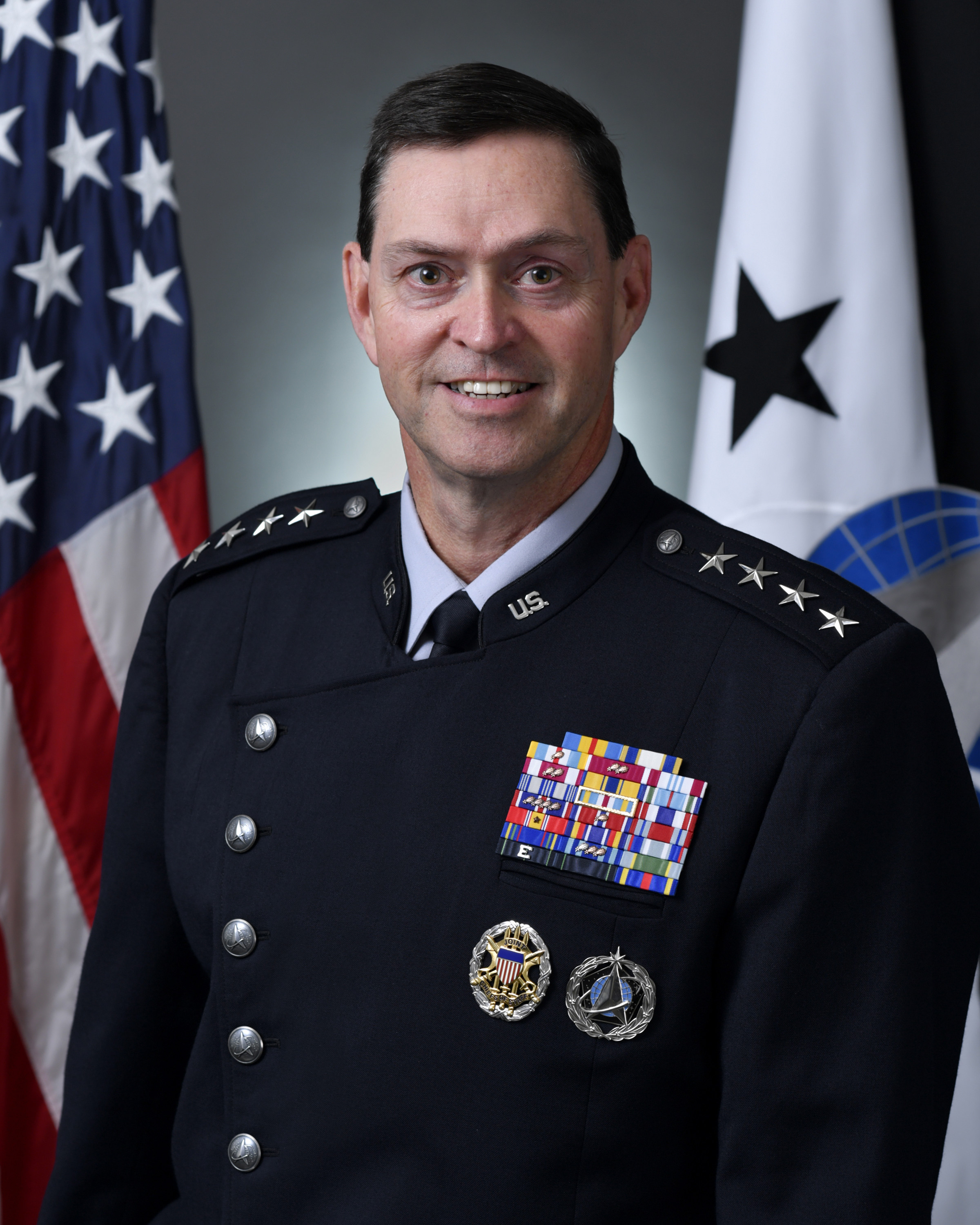
B. Chance Saltzman, United States Space Force general and the second and current chief of space operations
