= James Clarke Welling =

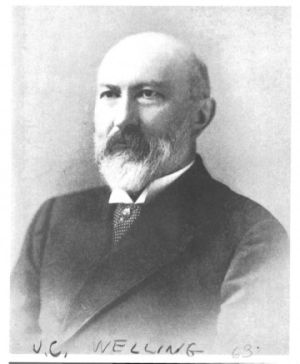
- Born: July 14, 1825; Trenton, New Jersey, U.S.
- Died: September 4, 1894 (aged 69); Hartford, Connecticut, U.S.
- Education: Princeton University, 1844
- Known for: President of Columbian University, now the George Washington University and cofounder of the National Geographic Society

James Clarke Welling (July 14, 1825 – September 4, 1894) was the President of Columbian University, now the George Washington University, Washington, DC, from 1871 to 1894. He was a cofounder of the National Geographic Society.

== Biography ==
James Clarke Welling was born in Trenton, New Jersey on July 14, 1825. He graduated from Princeton University in 1844. During the Civil War, he wrote for the National Intelligencer. Welling was a professor at Princeton when in 1871 he accepted the presidency of Columbian College. He became the sixth president of the university.

He was one of the ten founders of the Cosmos Club in 1878. In 1884, he served as president of the Philosophical Society of Washington.

"The last occasion in which he appeared in public was at the laying of the new cornerstone of the Corcoran Gallery of Art." Welling died at his summer residence in Hartford, Connecticut on September 4, 1894.

== Other sources ==
- Life and Writings of James Clarke Welling
- Memorial of James Clarke Welling by A. B. Hagner, 1894, published by Historical Society of Washington, D.C.
- James Clarke Welling, published in The American Anthropologist
