= Stephen Joel Trachtenberg =

American academic (born 1937)

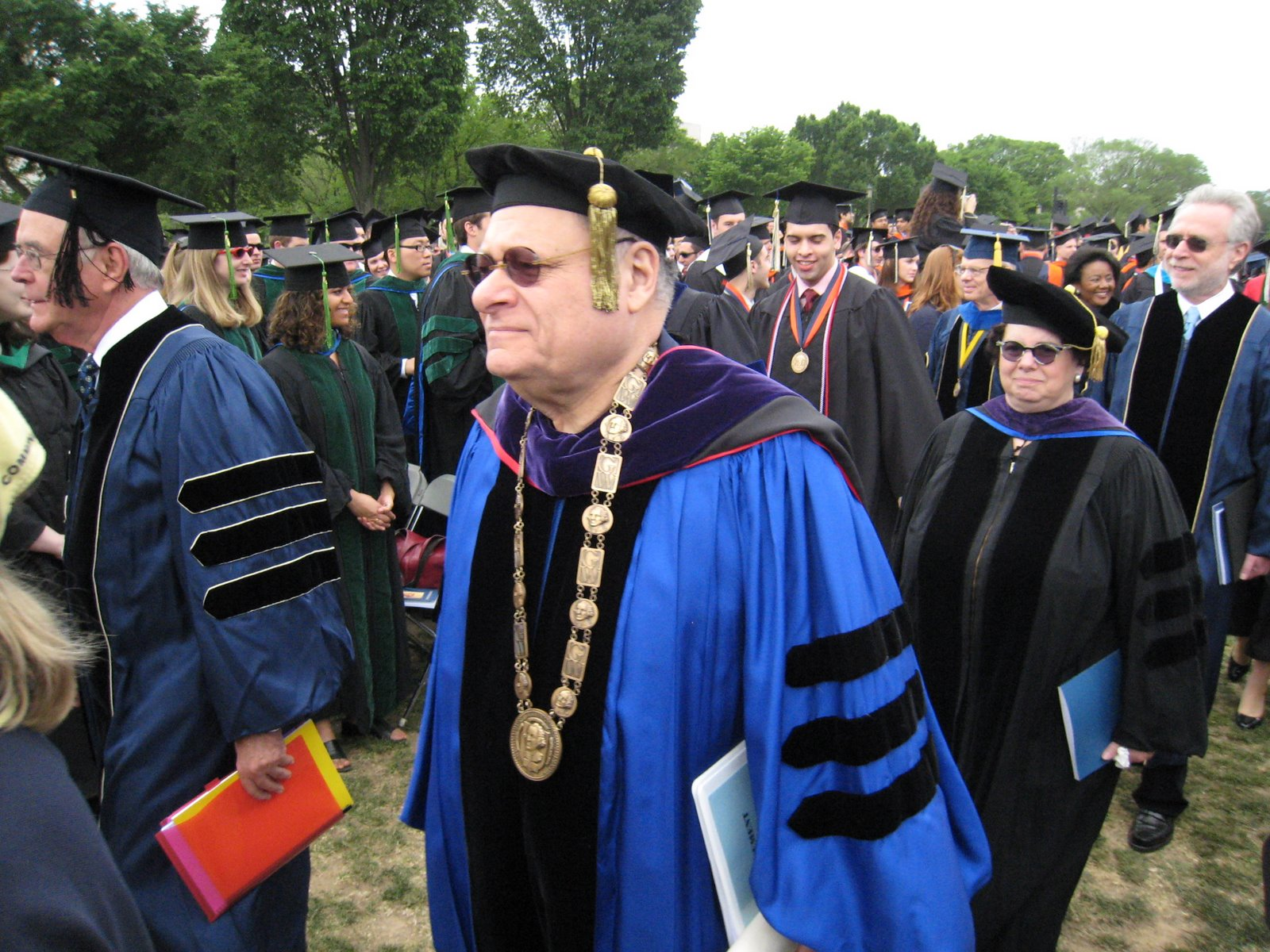
- Trachtenberg at his final George Washington University commencement in May 2007

15th President of the George Washington University
- In office 1988–2007
- Preceded by: Lloyd Hartman Elliott
- Succeeded by: Steven Knapp

3rd President of the University of Hartford
- In office 1977–1988
- Preceded by: Archibald M. Woodruff
- Succeeded by: Humphrey Tonkin

Personal details
- Born: December 14, 1937 (age 88) Brooklyn, New York, U.S.
- Spouse: Francine Trachtenberg
- Education: Columbia University; Yale Law School; Harvard Kennedy School
- Profession: Educator

Stephen Joel Trachtenberg (born December 14, 1937) is a former academic administrator who was the 15th President of the George Washington University, serving from 1988 to 2007. On August 1, 2007, he retired from the presidency and became GW's President Emeritus and University Professor of Public Service at the Trachtenberg School of Public Policy and Public Administration.

== Early life and education ==
Trachtenberg was born in Brooklyn, New York City, on December 14, 1937. He graduated from James Madison High School in Brooklyn in 1955. He graduated from Columbia University in 1959, a J.D. from Yale Law School in 1962, and a Master of Public Administration degree from the Harvard Kennedy School in 1966. He is a brother of Zeta Beta Tau.

== Career ==
He served as the special assistant to the U.S. Education Commissioner for the Department of Health, Education, and Welfare. He began his career in higher education at Boston University and later became president at the University of Hartford. He then worked at George Washington University in Washington, D.C.

He is the author of Presidencies Derailed, The Art of Hiring in America's Colleges & Universities, Thinking Out Loud, Reflections on Higher Education, Speaking His Mind,, and Big Man on Campus and the foreword to Commercial Providence. He co-authored The Art of Hiring in America's Colleges & Universities and Letters to the Next President.

He has received 22 honorary degrees in recognition of his contributions to higher education. These include an honorary Doctor of Laws degree from Columbia University in 2007, a Doctor of Public Service degree from George Washington University in 2008, an honorary Doctor of Public Administration degree from South Korea's Kyonggi University, an honorary Doctor of Laws degree from Hanyang University in South Korea, and an honorary Doctor of Humanities degree from the University of Hartford in 1989.

=== George Washington University ===
Trachtenberg started a full scholarship program for DC public school students, increased the national profile of the university, and has fostered the observance of school traditions, including George Washington's birthday celebration.

During Trachtenberg's tenure as president the university created five new schools: Public Health and Health Services, Public Policy and Public Administration, College of Professional Studies, Graduate School of Political Management, and Media and Public Affairs; initiated the University Honors Program; upgraded GW's library system, which now contains more than two million books and is a member of the prestigious Association of Research Libraries; elevated GW's NCAA Division One athletic program, including record-setting years for men's and women's basketball teams; strengthened university relations with District of Columbia civic leadership; established Northern Virginia and Mount Vernon campuses; upgraded and developed University academic, residential, and recreational facilities; and raised tuition prices.

The university Board of Trustees renamed the public policy school for Trachtenberg, calling it the Trachtenberg School of Public Policy and Public Administration, similar to when the university renamed the Elliott School of International Affairs for Lloyd Elliott, the outgoing president. Trachtenberg holds an endowed chair of public service in the newly named Trachtenberg School. In the Spring of 2007, after announcing his retirement, President Trachtenberg announced himself as that year's commencement keynote speaker, a move met by widespread student outcry and petitioning. Trachtenberg withdrew from the keynote position citing the Virginia Tech massacre without further elaboration.

When Trachtenberg took office in 1988, tuition at GWU was $9,570, significantly below the national median of $11,330 for all four-year colleges. When he left office in 2007, tuition was $37,790, among the highest in the nation and significantly above the national median of $30,226. Financial aid kept pace with tuition.

Trachtenberg was recognized throughout his career at GW for his commitment to education. By Resolution of the Mayor and the Council of the District of Columbia, Dec. 4, 2006, was declared "Stephen Joel Trachtenberg Day," recognizing his 19 years of leadership at GW and in the city. Similarly, by Resolution of the Council of the District of Columbia, January 22, 1998, was declared "Stephen Joel Trachtenberg Day" in honor of President Trachtenberg's commitments to minority students, scholarship programs, public school partnerships and community service.

In the Chronicle of Higher Education survey of college presidents' salaries for 2007–08, then-President Stephen Trachtenberg topped the nation with a compensation of $3.7 million.

=== Rimon Law ===
Trachtenberg is currently a partner at the international law firm Rimon Law P.C. He joined the firm on December 1, 2014, and is based at the Washington D.C. office. He heads the firm's University Practice group.

=== Other ===
U.S. President George W. Bush appointed Trachtenberg to serve in the Honorary Delegation to accompany him to Jerusalem for the celebration of the 60th anniversary of the State of Israel in May 2008.

Trachtenberg is a Fellow of the American Bar Association, the American Academy of the Arts and Sciences, and the National Academy of Public Administration. He also chaired the Rhodes Scholarships Selection Committee for Maryland and the District of Columbia.

Trachtenberg has served as chairman of the Board of the DC Chamber of Commerce and also served on the transition team for the Mayor of the District of Columbia.

After retiring from George Washington University, Trachtenberg joined the retained executive search firm Korn Ferry as Chairman of the Education Specialty Practice.

An inscription on the reverse side of a bust of George Washington on the North lawn of the House of the Temple, a Masonic temple in Washington, D.C., cites Trachtenberg as a 33° Freemason of the Scottish Rite. Trachtenberg contributed a foreword to the book by William L. Fox, Lodge of The Double-Headed Eagle: Two Centuries of Scottish Rite Freemasonry In America's Southern Jurisdiction (1997). Trachtenberg's status as a Mason is also confirmed in a history of GWU's business school, and the role that local Masons played in its founding.

Trachtenberg has served on numerous boards and committees, including the Bankiter Foundation, the Ditchley Foundation, the National Board of Trade, the Federal City Council, the Locite Corporation, MNC, Riggs Bank, the CNO Executive Panel, and The White House Fellows Selection Panel. He was awarded the Open Forum Distinguished Public Service Award by the Secretary of State and received the Department of the Treasury Medal of Merit.

Academic offices
Preceded by Lloyd Hartman Elliott	15th President of the George Washington University; 1988-2007	Succeeded by Steven Knapp

Academic offices
Preceded by Archibald M. Woodruff	3rd President of the University of Hartford; 1977-1988	Succeeded by Humphrey Tonkin
