= Timothy M. Swager =

American Chemist and Materials Scientist

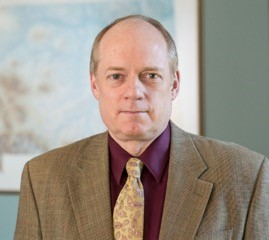
- Born: Timothy Manning Swager; July 1, 1961 (age 65); Sheridan Montana
- Education: Montana State University (BS); California Institute of Technology (PhD)
- Scientific career
- Fields: Chemistry, Materials science, Polymer science
- Workplaces: University of Pennsylvania, Massachusetts Institute of Technology
- Thesis: Precursor routes to conducting polymers from the ring-opening metathesis polymerization of cyclic olefins. (1988)
- Doctoral advisor: Robert H. Grubbs
- Other academic advisors: Mark S. Wrighton
- Website: swagergroup.mit.edu

Timothy M. Swager (born 1961) is an American Scientist and the John D. MacArthur Professor of Chemistry at the Massachusetts Institute of Technology. His research is at the interface of chemistry and materials science, with specific interests in carbon nanomaterials, polymers, and liquid crystals. He is an elected member of the National Academy of Sciences, American Academy of Arts and Sciences, and the National Academy of Inventors.

== Career and research ==
A native of Sheridan Montana, Swager earned his BS in Chemistry from Montana State University, received a PhD from the California Institute of Technology working with Robert H. Grubbs, and performed postdoctoral studies at the Massachusetts Institute of Technology under Mark S. Wrighton. He began as an assistant professor at the University of Pennsylvania in 1990 and returned to MIT in 1996 as a Full Professor. Swager is best known for advancing new chemical sensing concepts based on molecular electronic principles. He introduced the concepts of charge and energy transport through molecular and nanowires as a method to create amplified signals to chemical events. These methods gave rise to the sensitive explosive sensors that have been commercialized under the trade name Fido. He demonstrated the integration of molecular recognition into chemiresistive sensors, first with conducting polymers and later with carbon nanotubes, and these methods were first commercialized by C_{2}Sense. He is also the cofounder of PolyJoule Inc. that produces organic batteries for stationary energy storage, and founded Xibus Systems that is developing improved methods for pathogenic bacteria detection in food production.

Swager also has pioneering contributions to the areas of liquid crystals demonstrating how novel molecular shapes can be used to introduce intermolecular correlations in structures and alignment. In the area of high strength materials, by creating interlocking structures with enhanced ductility and strength. In carbon nanomaterials he has developed methods for functionalizing and/or dispersing graphenes and carbon nanotubes. Also he has designed novel radical materials in collaboration with Robert G. Griffin (MIT) for dynamic nuclear polarization to enhance the signal to noise ratio in NMR experiments. A number of these enhancement agents are commercially available from DyNuPol Corp. Swager has published more than 500 peer reviewed manuscripts and has more than 100 issued patents. As of January 2024, he has a Hirsch index of 120.

== Notable awards ==
- 2005 Carl S. Marvel Creative Polymer Chemistry Award, American Chemical Society
- 2005 Christopher Columbus Foundation Homeland Security Award
- 2007 Lemelson-MIT Award for Invention and Innovation
- 2008 Honorary Doctorate of Science, Montana State University
- 2013 Award for Creative Invention, American Chemical Society
- 2016 Gustavus John Esselen Award for Chemistry in the Public Interest
- 2016 Linus Pauling Award
- 2019 Polymer Chemistry Award, American Chemical Society
- 2025 American Chemical Society Arthur C. Cope Award

== Bibliography ==
- Swager, Timothy M.; Xu, Bing (1994). "Liquid crystalline calixarenes". Journal of Inclusion Phenomena and Molecular Recognition in Chemistry. 19 (1–4): 389–398. doi:10.1007/BF00708995. ISSN 0923-0750.
- Swager, Timothy M. (2004). "Polymer Electronics for Explosives Detection". Electronic Noses & Sensors for the Detection of Explosives. NATO Science Series II: Mathematics, Physics and Chemistry. Vol. 159. Dordrecht: Springer Netherlands. pp. 29–37. doi:10.1007/1-4020-2319-7_2. ISBN 978-1-4020-2317-0.
- Tovar, J. D.; Swager, T. M. "Synthesis of Tunable Electrochromic and Fluorescent Polymers" Chapter 28, pp 368–376 in Jenekhe, Samson A.; Meeting, American Chemical Society. (2005). Chromogenic Phenomena in Polymers. Washington, DC : [Oxford, England; New York]: American Chemical Society; Distributed by Oxford University Press. ISBN 978-0-8412-3830-5.
- Swager, Timothy M. (December 14, 2004). "Semiconducting Poly(arylene ethylene)s". Acetylene Chemistry. Wiley. pp. 233–258. doi:10.1002/3527605487.ch6. ISBN 978-3-527-30781-4.
- Swager, Timothy M. (2006). "Realizing the Ultimate Amplification in Conducting Polymer Sensors: Isolated Nanoscopic Pathways". Redox Systems Under Nano-Space Control. Berlin/Heidelberg: Springer-Verlag. pp. 29–44. doi:10.1007/3-540-29580-1_2. ISBN 978-3-540-29579-2.
- Thomas, S.W.; Swager, T.M. (2009). "Detection of Explosives Using Amplified Fluorescent Polymers". Aspects of Explosives Detection. Elsevier. doi:10.1016/b978-0-12-374533-0.00010-6. ISBN 978-0-12-374533-0.
- VanVeller, Brett; Swager, Timothy M. (April 19, 2010). "Poly(aryleneethynylene)s". Design and Synthesis of Conjugated Polymers. Wiley. doi:10.1002/9783527629787.ch5. ISBN 978-3-527-32474-3.
- Andrew, T. L.; Swager, T. M. "Exciton Transport through Conjugated Molecular Wires" in Siebbeles, Laurens D. A.; Grozema, Ferdinand C. (March 7, 2011). Charge and Exciton Transport through Molecular Wires. Hoboken: Wiley-VCH. ISBN 978-3-527-32501-6.
- Levine, Mindy; Swager, Timothy M. (January 19, 2011). "Conjugated Polymer Sensors: Design, Principles, and Biological Applications". Functional Supramolecular Architectures. Wiley. doi:10.1002/9783527689897.ch04. ISBN 978-3-527-32611-2.
