= Clifford Kubiak =

American inorganic chemist (born 1953)

- Born: 1953 (age 72–73)
- Education: Brown University (B.S, 1975); University of Rochester (M.S, 1977); University of Rochester (PhD, 1980)
- Known for: Mixed valence systems, carbon dioxide fixation, nanoscience
- Awards: American Chemical Society Award in Inorganic Chemistry (2012); Inter-American Photochemical Society Award in Photochemistry (2013)
- Scientific career
- Fields: Inorganic chemistry
- Workplaces: University of California, San Diego
- Website: kubiak.ucsd.edu/index.html

Clifford P. Kubiak is an American inorganic chemist, currently a Distinguished Professor in Chemistry and Biochemistry and the Harold C. Urey Chair in Chemistry at the University of California, San Diego. Over the course of his career, Kubiak has published over 200 scientific articles. He has also received the American Chemical Society Award in Inorganic Chemistry, and is a Fellow of the American Academy of Arts and Sciences and American Chemical Society. In 2020 he was elected to the National Academy of Sciences.

== Early life and education ==
Kubiak grew up in Connecticut, and displayed an interest in chemistry from an early age.

In 1975, Kubiak received his bachelor's degree with honors in chemistry from Brown University. He also received a Ph.D. in chemistry from the University of Rochester in 1980, where he was a Sherman Clarke Fellow and an Elon Huntington Hooker Fellow.

== Career ==
After receiving his Ph. D., Kubiak performed postdoctoral research at the Massachusetts Institute of Technology with Mark S. Wrighton, where he worked from 1980 to 1981. In 1982, Kubiak joined the faculty of Purdue University as an assistant professor; in 1987, he became an associate professor, before becoming a full professor in 1990. During this time, he was also named the Robert A. Wheland Visiting Professor at the University of Chicago in 1997.

In 1998, Kubiak left Purdue University and moved to the University of California, San Diego as the Harold C. Urey Endowed Chair Professor in Chemistry. During his time at UCSD, he has also held the position of Chairman of the Department of Chemistry and Biochemistry from 2002 to 2006, and was named Distinguished Professor in Chemistry and Biochemistry in 2008. In 2012, he was also appointed to the position of Visiting Associate in Chemistry at the Joint Center for Artificial Photosynthesis (JCAP) at the California Institute of Technology. He was also an Invited Visiting Professor of electrocatalysis at the Paris Diderot University in 2014, and has been appointed to additional visiting positions at Tohoku University and the University of Erlangen.

Kubiak has also served on the editorial advisory boards of several publications, such as Accounts of Chemical Research, Inorganic Chemistry, and Materials Science in Semiconductor Processing.

== Research ==
The Kubiak Research Group at the Department of Chemistry and Biochemistry Graduate Program in Materials Science and Engineering currently studies the reduction of carbon dioxide by means of electrocatalysis and photoelectrocatalysis. In addition, his team has expanded research regarding electron-transfer reactions, which can be used in the advancement of molecular electronic devices.

=== Contributions to nanoscience ===
Kubiak was involved in the research of nanoscience, with a focus on self-assembled monolayers, from its early days in the 1990s. His work in this field has included research into gold nanoclusters and molecular conductivity.

==== Gold nanoparticles ====
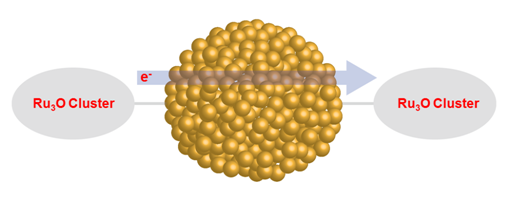
Electron transfer between discrete Ru_{3}O clusters through gold nanoparticles, as pictured, is ultrafast.

Among the properties of gold nanoparticles (or NPs) is their conductivity, allowing ultrafast electron transfer. In 2005, Kubiak, along with Gabriele Canzi, used gold NPs to generate a picosecond ground-state electron transfer reaction, marking the first time such a reaction had been performed. This ground-state electron transfer allowed for the accurate measurement of the resistances of individual carbon-based molecules.

In 2005, J. Catherine Salsman, Tasuku Ito, and Kubiak energetically distinguished the conductive properties of gold nanoclusters and individual molecules by labeling the structures isotopically, and utilized infrared spectroscopy to observe asymmetry.

==== Molecular self-assembly ====
In 1997, Kubiak and colleagues theoretically calculated the current-voltage properties of self-assembled monolayers (SAMs) of organic polymers. Such properties depend on the equilibrium Fermi energy and the voltage division factor, E_{f} and η respectively, as determined by means of scanning tunneling microscopy (STM).

=== Carbon dioxide fixation ===
In 2014, Kubiak and his colleagues from the University of California, San Diego determined the efficiency of an alternate Re^{I}(bpy) catalyst complex pathway, an assembled supramolecular system, which can assist in the reduction of CO_{2}. Later, his group also lead the work on replacing the scarce Re to the more abundant Mn in the catalyst for CO_{2} reduction. It was seen that the reduction of byproduct CO_{2}, driven by solar power, wind, or electricity generated by running water, can produce fuels by means of a carbon-neutral energy cycle.

== Non-scientific pursuits ==
In addition to his work in the scientific community, Kubiak has also served as the Faculty Athletics Representative for the Department of Intercollegiate Athletics at the University of California, San Diego, a position he has held since 2007. It is in this capacity that Kubiak received the Athletic Department's Meritorious Service Award in June 2013. He also chairs the Faculty Athletic Board of Advisors at the same university.

== Personal life ==
Kubiak is married, and currently resides with his wife in Del Mar, California.

== Controversies ==
In May 2011, a University of California, San Diego web page attributed to Kubiak was criticized for its use of a racial slur, specifically one targeting people of East Asian descent, as part of a list of “lab rules” supposedly meant to be humorous. The web page was subsequently removed by UCSD officials; additionally, a statement was issued by Suresh Subramani and Mark Thiemens, respectively the executive vice chancellor for academic affairs and the dean of physical sciences at UCSD, offering an apology for Kubiak's actions. Kubiak himself issued an apology as well, claiming that he had no knowledge of the slur's presence on his website but accepting full responsibility regardless.

== Awards and honors ==
In 2012, Kubiak was awarded the American Chemical Society Award in Inorganic Chemistry. In addition to this prestigious award, he has also received a number of other awards and honors, including the following:

=== Awards ===
- 1989: Frank D. Martin Undergraduate Teaching Award
- 1990: Charles B. Murphy Award for Outstanding Undergraduate Teaching
- 2008: National Science Foundation Award for Special Creativity
- 2009: Rochester Distinguished Scholar Award
- 2012: American Chemical Society Award in Inorganic Chemistry
- 2013: Inter-American Photochemical Society Award in Photochemistry
- 2015: Fred Basolo Medal for Outstanding Research in Inorganic Chemistry
- 2018: American Chemical Society Award in Organometallic Chemistry
- 2018: American Chemical Society Tolman Medal

=== Fellowships ===
- 1987-1991: Alfred P. Sloan Fellow
- 1995-1996, 2007: Japan Society for the Promotion of Science
- 2012: American Chemical Society
- 2014: American Academy of Arts and Sciences (elected fellow)
- 2017: Royal Society of Chemistry
