= Cloyd H. Marvin =

President of George Washington University (1927 to 1959)

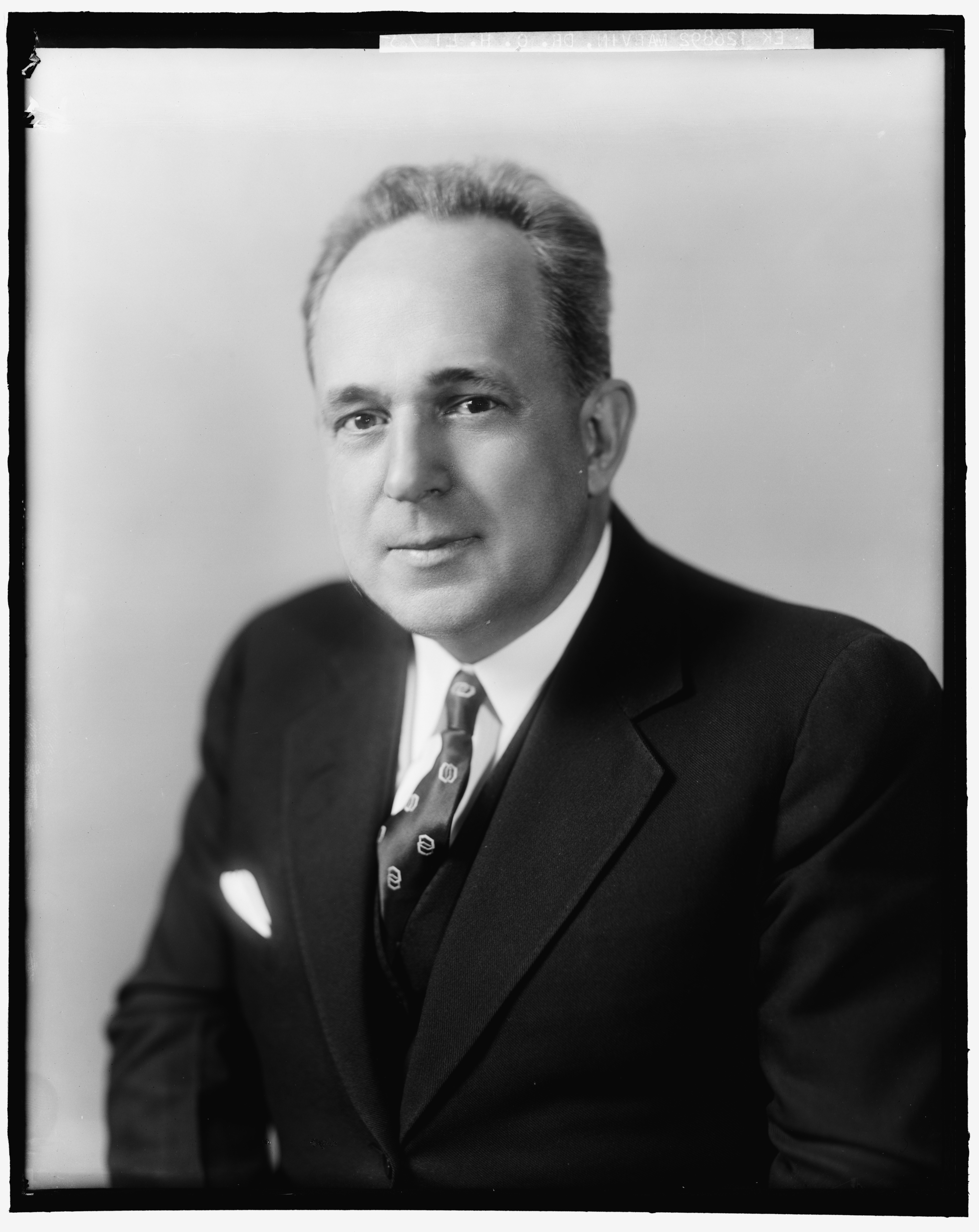

President of the George Washington University
- In office 1927–1959
- Preceded by: William Mather Lewis
- Succeeded by: Thomas H. Carroll

Personal details
- Born: August 22, 1889 Findlay, Ohio, U.S.
- Died: April 27, 1969 (aged 79)
- Spouse: Dorothy Ellen Betts
- Education: University of Southern California (A.B); Harvard University (A.M, Ph.D.); University of New Mexico (LL.D)

Cloyd Heck Marvin (August 22, 1889 – April 27, 1969) was the longest serving president of the George Washington University, from 1927 to 1959, and previously the then-youngest American university president from 1922–1927 at the University of Arizona. He was a freemason.

== Career ==
=== Education and early career ===
Marvin graduated from Riverside High School and studied at Stanford University for two years from 1909 to 1911. He gained degrees from the University of Southern California (A.B.,1915), Harvard University (A.M, 1917, PhD 1920), and the University of New Mexico (honorary L.L.D., 1923). He was a Phi Delta Kappa member. He was a World War I veteran. He then taught at the University of California at Los Angeles, in two years rising from assistant professor to dean and public business adviser.

=== University of Arizona ===
In 1921 was hired to teach economics at the University of Arizona. Marvin became president of the University of Arizona in 1922, at 32 being the youngest American university president. Choosing between building a student union building and a new library in 1924, he chose the latter (now the North Building of the Arizona State Museum).

He resigned along with four members of the Board of Regents on January 19, 1927 in a scandal that drew national attention and is still studied in the 21st century. In 1924, three faculty members that had been fired by Marvin appealed to the American Association of University Professors. The AAUP launched an independent investigation and their report released in November 1924 was critical of Marvin's administration. The report prompted editor Woodson Upshaw's Tucson Daily Independent, then a new weekly newspaper, to begin an editorial campaign against Marvin. This campaign led the Tucson Merchants' Association, strong supporters of Marvin, to begin an advertising boycott of the paper. This should have reduced by the advertising pool by 70%, but had the opposite effect of galvanizing interest in the affair, rallying independent advertisers and the Railroad Brotherhood, and quadrupling the paper's circulation, which quickly became a daily.

The feud then spilled into the University's board of regents, even pitting Governor Hunt against Chancellor Ellinwood. When one of the fired faculty was elected to the Board of Regents, removing his majority on the board, Marvin and his four supporters on the board resigned.

=== George Washington University ===
He was elected to succeed William Mather Lewis as President of George Washington University in June 1927 and took office that September. He established a School of Government at the George Washington University in 1928 using $1 million donated by the Supreme Council of the Scottish Rite Masons, Southern Jurisdiction, a Masonic lodge.

Cloyd Heck Marvin was the greatest and the worst thing that happened to GW. He built and destroyed; he mended and divided; he left a complicated legacy for his successors.

— Andrew Novak, 2004

Under Marvin the number of students doubled and faculty tripled, though over 100 protests were lodged against perceived unfair dismissals. The Research Editor of the GW Hatchet, Andrew Novak, wrote of Marvin's "persecution of liberals among the faculty, his well-documented support of segregation and his constant disregard for the civil liberties of students". Marvin oversaw the admission of the first black students to George Washington University in 1954; he also oversaw the dismissal of an atheist in 1956, stating that "as a matter of policy, we do not have anyone teaching who does not have faith in God."

The Cloyd Heck Marvin Center at George Washington University was named after him in February 1970. After decades of protests over Marvin’s racist and antisemitic legacy, the building was renamed on June 29, 2021 as "University Student Center" following the recommendation of a committee of students, faculty, staff and alumni.

=== Other work ===
Marvin was President of the National Parks Association 1933–1935, replacing Wallace Attwood and being replaced by William P. Wharton; John Miles wrote that "The record contains little evidence that President Marvin provided much leadership during his tenure".

Marvin was deputy director for research and development in the War Department from September 18, 1946 to August 31, 1947, serving under Major General Henry Aurand, and he was then a Special Advisor to the Secretary of War, September 1947-9. He received the Department of the Army's Award for Exceptional Achievement for this service.

== Personal life ==
Marvin was born in Findlay, Ohio. His parents were Ezekiel Cloyd Marvin, a businessman, and Ida Gertrude Heck.

He initiated into a Masonic lodge in Portland Oregon in 1918. He became a Knight Commander in the Scottish Rite, Southern Jurisdiction, in 1931. He was a Republican. He was a member of the American Legion.

After Marvin died in 1969, his widow Dorothy Ellen Betts, whom he had married in July 1917, donated $1 million (the result of her investing $20,000 over 13 years) in 1971 for the Cloyd Heck Marvin Student Center and theater. His son Cloyd, a mathematician at Johns Hopkins University, died in June 2011.
