= Thomas LeBlanc =

American academic and university administrator

17th President of the George Washington University
- In office July 1, 2017 – December 31, 2021
- Preceded by: Steven Knapp
- Succeeded by: Mark S. Wrighton (interim)
- Scientific career
- Education: State University of New York, Plattsburgh; University of Wisconsin–Madison (PhD)
- Fields: Computer science
- Workplaces: University of Rochester; University of Miami; George Washington University
- Thesis: The design and performance of high-level language primitives for distributed programming (1982)

Thomas John LeBlanc is a computer scientist and academic administrator. He was the 17th President of the George Washington University from July 2017 to December 2021.

== Education ==
LeBlanc earned a Bachelor of Science in computer sciences from the State University of New York, Plattsburgh. He earned a master's degree and a Ph.D. in computer sciences from the University of Wisconsin–Madison in 1982.

== Career ==
LeBlanc has been widely published in computer science and engineering journals. LeBlanc has served as principal investigator or co-principal investigator on eight federally-funded research initiatives. He is a member of the Association for Computing Machinery and the Institute of Electrical and Electronics Engineers.

LeBlanc served as Vice Provost & Dean of the Faculty of Arts, Sciences, and Engineering at the University of Rochester. He was chair of the department of computer science and the Dean of the College Faculty. He is credited with the development of the biomedical engineering department with the University of Rochester Medical Center.

LeBlanc then served as the University of Miami's Chief Academic Officer, Chief Budget Officer, Executive Vice-president, and Provost. While at the University of Miami, LeBlanc led the development and implementation of the university's strategic plan. He served as interim President of the University of Miami in 2015. He also led the deans in the design of a $1.6 billion fundraising campaign.

== President of George Washington University ==
LeBlanc became the President of the George Washington University in July 2017. He had previously worked with GW as the chair of the evaluation team for GW's academic accreditation during the 2007–2008 academic year.

He was inaugurated as the President of the George Washington University by swearing an oath on the George Washington Inaugural Bible.

In May 2021, LeBlanc said he would retire from his position at GWU at the end of the 2021–2022 academic year. However, in September 2021, GWU's Board of Trustees Chair Grace E. Speights said LeBlanc would step down at the end of 2021, to be replaced by former Washington University in St. Louis Chancellor Mark S. Wrighton on an interim basis while a search is being conducted for a permanent replacement.

=== Controversies ===
On February 1, 2020, a video was posted to the George Washington University Overheard Facebook page where a freshman at the university, Sophie Gengler, asked President LeBlanc about divestment from fossil fuels. In the video, LeBlanc admitted for the first time that 3% of the university's endowment is indirectly invested in the fossil fuels industry through buying funds that invest in "whatever they want to invest in" which includes the carbon industry. This, along with other points the president made about the university's relationship with climate change activism and their opponents, sparked a student protest and several petitions demanding for the university to divest immediately.

In the same video, LeBlanc criticized majority rule over GW policy by saying, "What if the majority of the students agreed to shoot all the black people here?" Students quickly condemned the president's comments as "racially insensitive" and "thoughtless." The president later apologized, saying "The point I was making – that majority rule should never suppress the human rights of others – was obscured by the example I used...I regret my choice of words and any harm I unintentionally inflicted on a community I value greatly."
