= Steven Knapp =

American academic

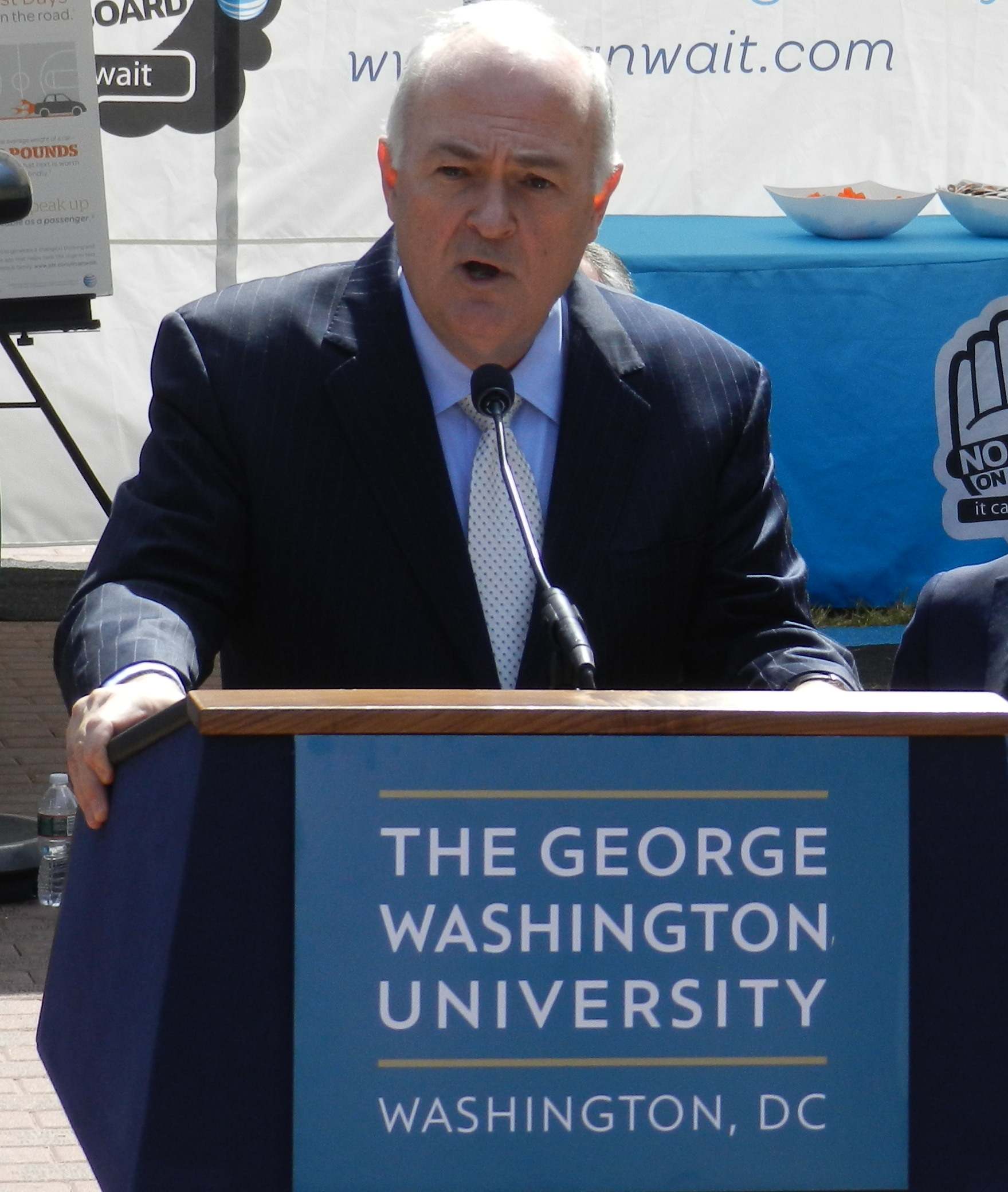
- Knapp in September 2012

16th President of George Washington University
- In office August 2007 – November 2017
- Preceded by: Stephen Joel Trachtenberg
- Succeeded by: Thomas LeBlanc

Personal details
- Born: Westwood, New Jersey, U.S.
- Spouse: Dianne Knapp

Steven Knapp is an American academic who served as the 16th President of the George Washington University, in Washington, D.C., succeeding Stephen Joel Trachtenberg. He currently serves on the boards of the World Affairs Council, the Economic Club of Washington, DC, the U.S. Council on Competitiveness, and the National Symphony Orchestra, as well as serving as a fellow of the Council on Foreign Relations and the Modern Language Association.

Prior to GW, Knapp served as the dean of Johns Hopkins University's School of Arts and Sciences. On June 7, 2016, Knapp announced that he would not seek a third term as University President, and therefore would be concluding his tenure as in July 2017.

== Early life and education ==
Knapp grew up in Westwood, New Jersey. He attended Yale University, where he graduated with a Bachelor of Arts degree in 1973, and then Cornell University, where he earned a master's degree in 1977 and his Ph.D. in 1981.

== Career ==
A specialist in Romanticism, literary theory, and the relation of literature to philosophy and religion, Knapp taught English literature at the University of California, Berkeley.

=== Johns Hopkins University ===
Knapp was dean of the School of Arts and Sciences at Johns Hopkins University in Baltimore from 1994 to 1996 and then the university's provost from 1996 to 2007.

=== George Washington University ===
From August 2007 to November 2017, Knapp served as the 16th President of the George Washington University in Washington, D.C. During Knapp's tenure, the university constructed District House, a large residence hall and the Science and Engineering Hall, both located on the Foggy Bottom campus. The Science and Engineering Hall is the largest academic and laboratory building in the nation's capital. Under Knapp, the $1 Billion "Making History: The Campaign for GW" fundraising initiative was successfully completed. Knapp declined to seek a third term as university president and stepped down in November 2017. He continues to teach at the university.

== Board and leadership positions ==
Knapp serves on the boards of directors of the Economic Club of Washington, the Greater Washington Urban League, the World Affairs Council, the National Symphony Orchestra, and the boards of trustees of the Washington National Cathedral Foundation and Al Akhawayn University in Ifrane, Morocco. He also serves on the senior advisory board of the Northern Virginia Technology Council, the executive committee of the Council on Competitiveness, and the education committee of the Federal City Council.

He is a fellow of the American Academy of Arts and Sciences, a member of the Council on Foreign Relations, and a member of the Modern Language Association.
