= List of presidents of the George Washington University =

The president of the George Washington University is the chief executive officer of the George Washington University, appointed by the GW Board of Trustees and charged "to establish the university's vision, oversee its teaching and research mission and guide its future."

The first President of what was then known as Columbian College was clergyman and Chaplain of the United States Senate, William Staughton. Although Columbian College was founded by prominent Baptists, its Congressional Charter forbade any religious restrictions for the University. As such, the Presidents of the University succeeding Staughton were not required to be Baptists. The Presidents of the George Washington University have been selected by its Board of Trustees.

The current president of the George Washington University is Ellen Granberg. University officials announced Granberg would succeed incumbent Mark S. Wrighton. Granberg took office on 1 July 2023. In January 2023, the university announced that Ellen Granberg had been selected to succeed Wrighton. Granberg, who will become the first woman to serve as president of George Washington University, took office on July 1, 2023.

== List ==
The following persons have served as president of George Washington University:

No.	Image	President	Term start	Term end	Ref.
Presidents of Columbian College (1821–1873)
1		William Staughton	1821	1827	
2		Stephen Chapin	1828	1841	
3		Joel Smith Bacon	1843	1854	
4		Joseph Getchell Binney	1855	1858	
5		George W. Samson	1859	1871	
Presidents of Columbian University (1873–1904)
6		James Clarke Welling	1871	September 4, 1894 (Note: Died in office.)	
acting		Samuel Harrison Greene	1894	1895	
7		Beniah Longley Whitman	1895	1900	
acting		Samuel Harrison Greene	1900	1902	
Presidents of George Washington University (1904–present)
8		Charles W. Needham	1902	1910	
9		Charles H. Stockton	1910	1918	
10		William Miller Collier	1918	1921	
ad interim		Howard Lincoln Hodgkins	1921	1923	
11		William Mather Lewis	1923	1927	
12		Cloyd H. Marvin	1927	1959	
acting		Oswald Symister Colclough (Note: Provost)	1959	1961	
13		Thomas H. Carroll	1961	July 27, 1964	
acting		Oswald Symister Colclough	1964	1965	
14		Lloyd Hartman Elliott	1965	July 31, 1988	
15		Stephen Joel Trachtenberg	August 1, 1988	July 31, 2007	
16		Steven Knapp	August 1, 2007	July 31, 2017	
17		Thomas LeBlanc	August 1, 2017	December 31, 2022	
18 interim		Mark S. Wrighton	January 1, 2022	June 30, 2023	
19		Ellen Granberg	July 1, 2023	present	

Table notes:
