= Ellen Granberg =

American academic administrator and president of George Washington University

19th President of the George Washington University
- Incumbent
- Assumed office July 1, 2023
- Preceded by: Mark S. Wrighton (interim)

Personal details
- Born: 1962 (age 63–64)
- Spouse: Sonya Rankin
- Education: University of California, Davis (BA); Vanderbilt University (MA, PhD)

Academic background
- Thesis: Identity transformation (2001)
- Doctoral advisor: Peggy Thoits

Academic work
- Discipline: Sociology
- Institutions: Vanderbilt University; Clemson University; Rochester Institute of Technology; George Washington University

Ellen Marie Granberg (born 1962) is an American sociologist and academic administrator who became the 19th president of George Washington University on July 1, 2023.

== Early life and education ==
Granberg was born in 1962. She has a bachelor's degree from the University of California, Davis, where she was the editor of the California Aggie. She earned her master's and Ph.D. degrees from Vanderbilt University. Her doctoral thesis was on self identity based on health outcomes. According to Google Scholar, her research has been cited a total of 2,279 times and she has an h-index of 16 (i.e., 16 publications cited at least 16 times each). Her work has been on microsocial phenomenon on the self image, the identity, the well-being and ultimately the mental health of society but particularly of children.

== Career ==
In the 1980s and 1990s, Granberg served in the telecommunications industry at the Fortune 500 firm Pacific Bell and AT&T. She has been an academic administrator for over 25 years and first started her career in academia as a professor of sociology at Clemson University where she worked on nutrition science and obesity.

She spent 17 years at Clemson University before moving to Rochester Institute of Technology, where she was named provost in 2018. She became the first female provost and senior vice president for Academic Affairs at Rochester Institute of Technology. She is credited with expanding doctoral education and creating new facilities for instruction and research at Rochester Institute of Technology. In addition to expanding doctoral education and research, Granberg co-led the formation of RIT Certified, which aimed to promote professional mobility. It has a portfolio of alternative education courses, certificate programs and skill-based learning experiences.

In 2023, Granberg was named as the incoming president of George Washington University, the first woman and lesbian to hold the position of president at the university; Granberg started on July 2, 2023. After a decision by the Atlantic 10 Conference that they would relocate to Washington, D.C. in November 2023, Granberg announced that the men's basketball championships would be hosted by GW in 2025.

In 2023 students projected pro-Palestinian slogans onto Gelman Library. The student group, Students for Justice in Palestine, was suspended for 90 days after the incident. Granberg condemned what she called a "celebration of terrorism." SJP accused Granberg of using racist and Islamophobic language. During a conversation with alumni Granberg stated that she had wanted to expel the students.

== Personal life ==
Granberg met Sonya Rankin in November 1999 in Nashville, Tennessee. They married in 2016 following the legalization of same-sex marriage in the United States.
