= Mark S. Wrighton =

American chemist and university chancellor

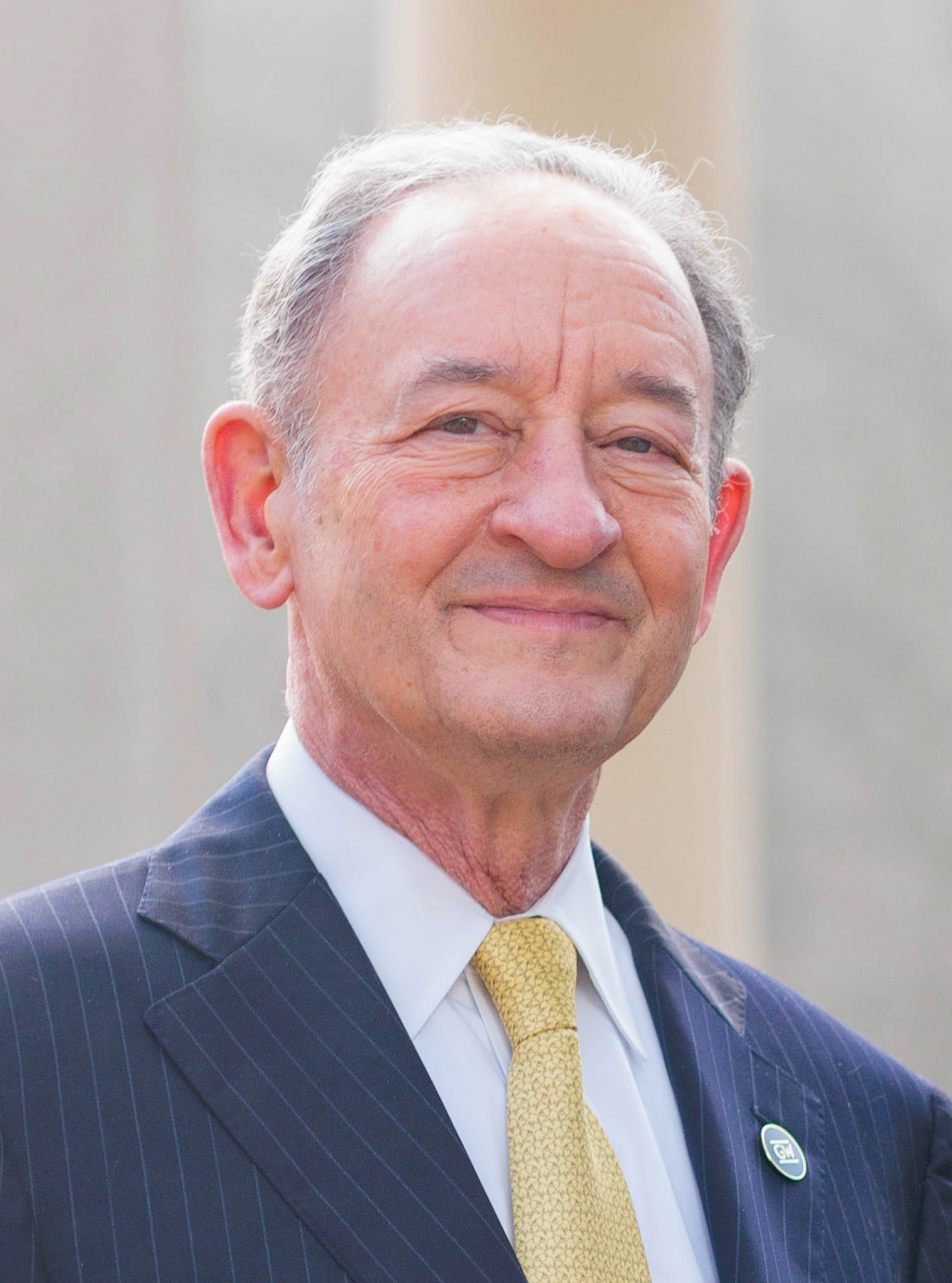
- Wrighton in 2022

Interim and 18th President of the George Washington University
- In office January 1, 2022 – June 30, 2023
- Preceded by: Thomas LeBlanc
- Succeeded by: Ellen Granberg

14th Chancellor of Washington University in St. Louis
- In office July 1, 1995 – May 31, 2019
- Preceded by: William Henry Danforth
- Succeeded by: Andrew D. Martin

Personal details
- Born: Mark Stephen Wrighton; June 11, 1949 (age 77) Jacksonville, Florida, U.S.
- Spouse: Risa Zwerling Wrighton
- Education: Florida State University (BS); California Institute of Technology (PhD)
- Profession: University administrator and chemistry professor
- Scientific career
- Fields: Inorganic photochemistry
- Workplaces: Massachusetts Institute of Technology; Washington University in St. Louis; The George Washington University
- Thesis: Photoprocesses in Metal-Containing Molecules (1972)
- Doctoral advisors: Harry B. Gray; George S. Hammond
- Doctoral students: Andrew B. Bocarsly; Arthur B. Ellis; Nathan Lewis
- Other notable students: Post-docs: Richard M. Crooks; Clifford Kubiak; Chad Mirkin; Lynn Schneemeyer; Timothy M. Swager; Christoph Weder; Undergrads: Peter T. Wolczanski

Mark Stephen Wrighton (born June 11, 1949) is an American academic and chemist. From 1995 to 2019, he served as the 14th Chancellor of Washington University in St. Louis, where he oversaw the expansion of the university’s research capabilities, global reputation, and financial strength. Since 2019, he has served as Chancellor Emeritus at Washington University in St. Louis and, in 2020, was named the university’s inaugural James and Mary Wertsch Distinguished University Professor. From January 2022 to June 2023, he took a sabbatical from Washington University to serve as interim and 18th president of George Washington University.

== Early life and education ==
Wrighton was born in Jacksonville, Florida, and his father spent most of his career in the United States Navy. Wrighton moved with his family from Jacksonville to Virginia, Tennessee, Maryland, and Newfoundland, and he went to high school in Pensacola, Florida.

Initially, Wrighton intended to study mathematics and government at Florida State University. Instead, inspired by his freshman chemistry professor, Edward Mellon, he switched his major to chemistry. Jack Saltiel became his advisor and mentor, and he continued undergraduate research in the area of organic photochemistry. Wrighton received his bachelor's degree with honors in chemistry at Florida State University in 1969, winning the Monsanto Chemistry Award for outstanding research. He received his PhD in 1972 at the age of 22 from California Institute of Technology, working under Harry B. Gray and George S. Hammond. His doctoral dissertation subject was Photoprocesses in Metal-Containing Molecules. At Caltech, he became the first recipient of the Herbert Newby McCoy Award.

== Career ==
=== Massachusetts Institute of Technology ===
Wrighton joined the faculty of the chemistry department at the Massachusetts Institute of Technology in the summer of 1972 as an assistant professor. In 1976, he was promoted to associate professor and was made a full professor the following year, 1977. Wrighton held the Frederick G. Keyes Chair in Chemistry from 1981 to 1989, when he was given the newly endowed Ciba-Geigy Chair in Chemistry. In 1983, he received a MacArthur Foundation "genius grant."

Wrighton's research interests are centered on photochemistry and transition metal catalysis, and include surface chemistry, molecular electronics and photoprocesses at electrodes. His goals include understanding the basic principles underlying the conversion of solar energy to chemical fuels and electricity, creating new catalysts, studying chemical activity at interfaces, and developing new electro-chemical devices.

Wrighton has carried out work in the areas of inorganic photochemistry, photocatalysis and the use of solar energy in photovoltaics. In the early 1970s he discovered photoluminescence in a new class of rhenium (I) tricarbonyl diimine complexes. In the 1980s, he and his co-workers developed molecule-based transistors having conducting polymers as the device active materials. Wrighton was one of the first researchers to introduce the idea of electrochemical gating as a way of controlling charge transport in molecular electronics. One of his later areas of research involved attempting to chemically mimic photosynthesis.

He has written more than 300 journal articles and holds 16 patents. He is co-author of Organometallic Photochemistry (1979, with Gregory L. Geoffroy), and editor of books and conference proceedings. During his time at MIT, Wrighton supervised the doctoral research of 70 students. In 1987, Wrighton became the head of MIT's chemistry department. He became MIT's provost in 1990.

=== Washington University in St. Louis ===
In 1995, he left MIT to become chancellor of Washington University in St. Louis. The new position required him to give up an active research career. He was among the highest paid university heads in the United States, making $738,000 in 2007. In early 2007, Wrighton was mentioned as a candidate for Harvard University's presidency.

As chancellor, he led two major capital campaigns that resulted in contributions totaling nearly $5 billion, including approximately $1 billion for student financial aid, as well as the creation of more than 300 endowed professorships. He was elected chairman of the Association of American Universities (2004-2005) He is also a past chair of the Business-Higher Education Forum (2004-2006) and the Consortium on Financing Higher Education (2000-2001).

Major programmatic initiatives during Wrighton's chancellorship include: the McDonnell International Scholars Academy; the Alvin J. Siteman Cancer Center; the Gephardt Institute for Civic and Community Engagement; the Institute for Public Health; the International Center for Energy, Environment and Sustainability; and the Living Earth Collaborative. New departments include: Sociology; Women, Gender and Sexuality Studies; African and African American Studies; Biomedical Engineering; and Radiation Oncology.

Wrighton was criticized in May 2008 when the university's board of trustees voted to honor alumna Phyllis Schlafly with an honorary doctorate, leading to outrage from opponents to her stance on gender issues and from many other members of the university community opposed to her disbelief in evolution. Wrighton distanced himself from the board's decision with a letter to the community disavowing Schlafly's views on science.

On October 6, 2017, Wrighton announced his intent to leave the chancellorship. He concluded his tenure as chancellor on May 31, 2019, to become Chancellor Emeritus and was appointed the James and Mary Wertsch Distinguished University Professor in August 2020.

=== George Washington University ===
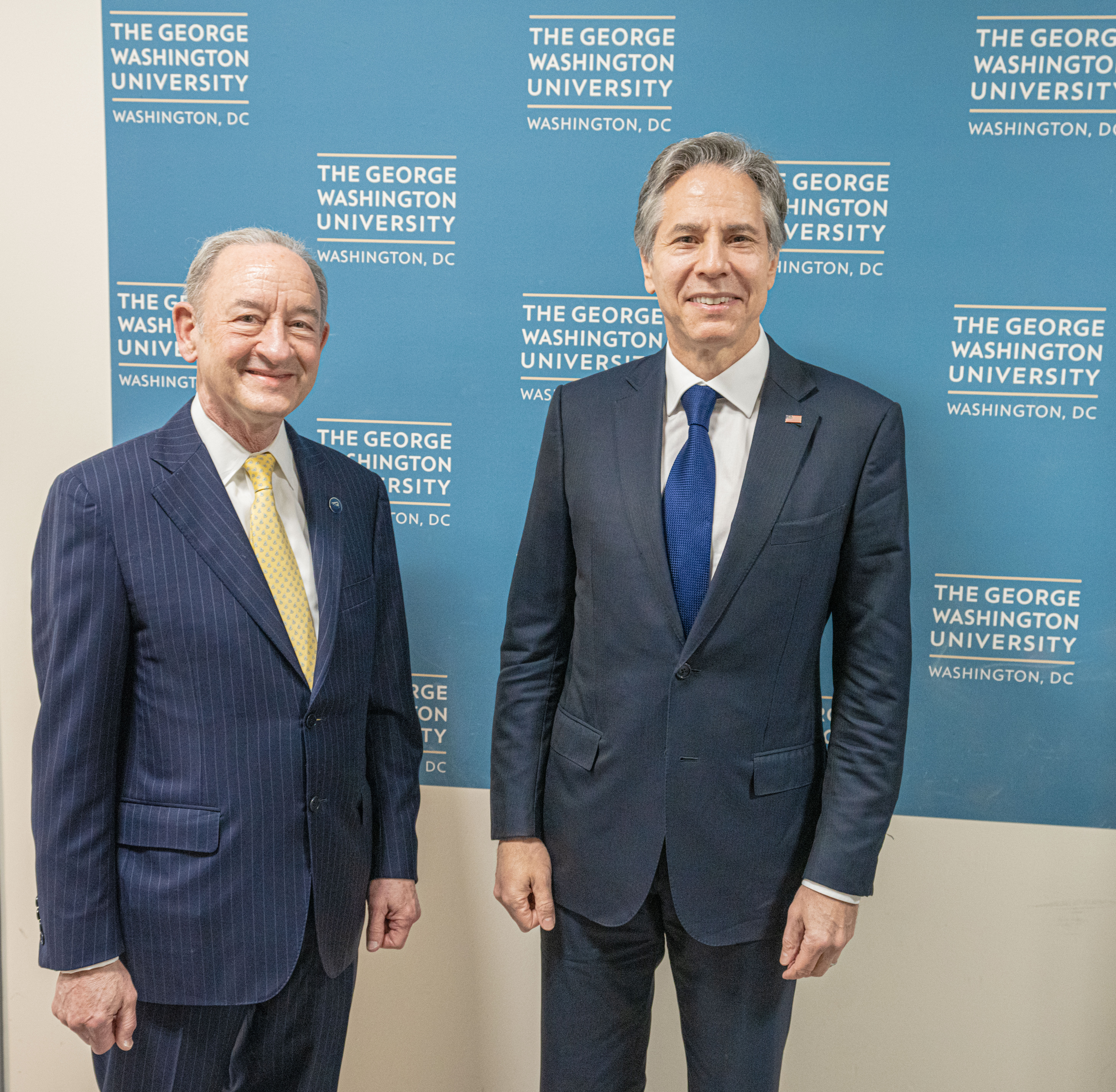
President Wrighton and Secretary of State Antony Blinken at George Washington University in 2022

On September 10, 2021, the George Washington University's board of trustees chair announced that Wrighton would serve as the university's interim president for a maximum of 18 months. Wrighton started his position at The George Washington University on January 1, 2022. He was on sabbatical from Washington University in St. Louis while serving at GWU. George Washington University became a member of the highly selective Association of American Universities under his presidency.

In February 2022, Wrighton caused controversy after removing posters from campus that accused the Chinese government of human rights abuses and criticized the country's hosting of the 2022 Winter Olympics. Wrighton claimed he was "personally offended" by the posters and pledged to find out who was responsible for them. The decision was criticized by the Foundation for Individual Rights in Education, which called the decision "a wholly inappropriate response to a university purportedly committed to free expression". Wrighton clarified in a public message that after his initial comments he learned the posters were designed by a Chinese-Australian artist and were a critique of China’s policies. He wrote: “Upon full understanding, I do not view these posters as racist; they are political statements. There is no university investigation underway, and the university will not take any action against the students who displayed the posters.”

=== National science policy ===
Wrighton served as a presidential appointee to the National Science Board (2000-2006), which acts as science policy advisor to the president and Congress and the National Science Foundation. He served as vice chair of the National Research Council's Committee on America's Energy Future, which issued its report in 2009.

While at Washington University in St. Louis, Wrighton was one of the signees of a letter from the Association of American Universities, urging all representatives of the U.S. Government to vote in favor of H.R. 810, the Stem Cell Research Enhancement Act of 2005. With leaders at three other Missouri universities, Wrighton wrote in support of somatic cell nuclear transfer (SCNT) research for medical treatment, urging Missouri legislators to distinguish it from the use of stem cells for human reproductive cloning.

=== International academic leadership ===
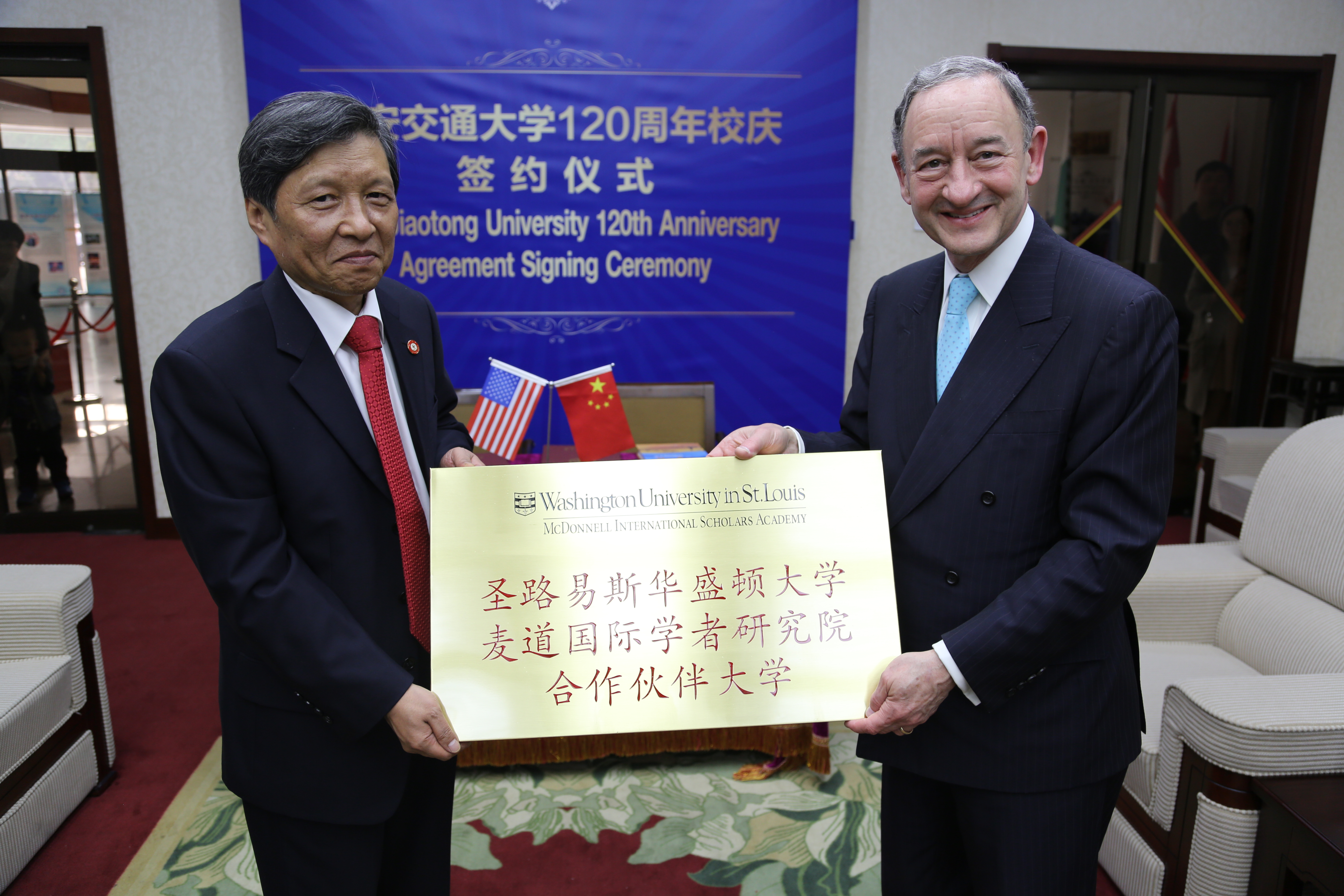
Xi'an Jiaotong University President Shuguo Wang exchanges a pai bian signboard with Washington University in St. Louis Chancellor Mark S. Wrighton after signing an agreement in 2016

Wrighton inaugurated the McDonnell International Scholars Academy as chancellor at Washington University. He brought Washington University into the University Alliance of the Silk Road, the academic arm of China's One Belt, One Road initiative, as the first North American partner. He formerly served as the only American member of the executive committee of the Universities Alliance of the Silk Road and resigned in 2019, which is when Washington University also left the Alliance.

== Awards and honors ==
- 1969 Monsanto Chemistry Award (Florida State)
- 1972 Herbert Newby McCoy Award (Caltech)
- 1974 Alfred P. Sloan Research Fellowship
- 1981
  - ACS Award in Pure Chemistry of the American Chemical Society
  - MIT Chemistry Department Graduate Teaching Award
- 1983
  - Honorary Doctor of Science at the University of West Florida
  - MacArthur Fellowship
  - George and Freda Halpern Award in Photochemistry from the New York Academy of Sciences
  - Ernest O. Lawrence Award from the U.S. Department of Energy
- 1984 Fresenius Award of Phi Lambda Upsilon
- 1987 MIT School of Science Teaching Prize
- 1988 Award in Inorganic Chemistry of the American Chemical Society
- 1992 Distinguished Alumni Award (Caltech)
- 1995 Honorary Alumnus (Massachusetts Institute of Technology)
- 2002 Honorary Professorship at Shandong University (Jinan, China)
- 2007 Citizen of the Year Award from the St. Louis Post-Dispatch
- 2007 Honorary Doctorate Degree- Doctor of Humane Letters Florida State University (Tallahassee, Florida)
- 2009 Honorary Doctorate Degree, Harris–Stowe State University (St. Louis, Missouri)
- 2010 Honorary Doctorate Degree, Fudan University (Shanghai, China)
- 2010 Right Arm of St. Louis Award from the St. Louis Regional Chamber
- 2019 Honorary Professor, Xidian University, Xi'an China
- 2019 Honorary Doctorate Degree, Interdisciplinary Center Herzliya (now Reichman University)

== Fellowships and appointments ==
- Member of the Chemistry Research Evaluation Panel of the Air Force Office of Scientific Research (1976–1980)
- Fellow of the American Association for the Advancement of Science (since 1986)
- Fellow of the American Academy of Arts and Sciences (since 1988)
- Member of the board of directors of Helix Technology (1990-2006 when it merged with Brooks Automation)
- Member of the board of overseers of the Boston Museum of Science (1991–1997)
- Member of the corporation of the Woods Hole Oceanographic Institution (1991–1995)
- Member of the corporation of the Charles Stark Draper Laboratory (1994–1996)
- Member of the board of directors of the Chemical Heritage Foundation (1998–2002)
- Trustee of the Higher Learning Commission of the North Central Association of Colleges and Schools (1998–2002)
- Trustee of the Donald Danforth Plant Science Center (1998-2019)
- Presidential Appointee to the National Science Board (2000–2006)
- Member of the American Philosophical Society (since 2001)
- Member of the board of directors of the National Association of Independent Colleges and Universities (2002–2005)
- Member of the board of directors of Brooks Automation (2006-2022)
- Member of the board of directors of Cabot Corporation (1997-March 2021)
- Member of the board of directors of Corning Incorporated (since 2009)
- Fellow of the National Academy of Inventors, 2013
- Member of the executive committee of China's University Alliance of the Silk Road, the academic arm of China's One Belt, One Road initiative (2016-2019)
- Member of the Forest Park Forever Board
- Member of the Saint Louis Science Center Board of Commissioners
- Member of the board of the United Way of Greater St. Louis
- Member of the Massachusetts Institute of Technology Corporation (July 2020-June 2021)
- Azenta Life Sciences Board (2022–23)
