= Lloyd Hartman Elliott =

American educator

14th President of the George Washington University
- In office 1965–1988
- Preceded by: Thomas H. Carroll
- Succeeded by: Stephen Joel Trachtenberg

9th President of the University of Maine
- In office 1958–1965
- Preceded by: Arthur A. Hauck
- Succeeded by: Hugh Young

Personal details
- Born: May 21, 1918 Crosby, Clay County, West Virginia, US
- Died: January 1, 2013 (aged 94)
- Spouse: Evelyn Elliott
- Education: Glenville State University

Lloyd Hartman Elliott (May 21, 1918 – January 1, 2013) was President of the George Washington University from 1965 to 1988. He was born in Crosby, Clay County, West Virginia in 1918. He was also a professor of educational administration at Cornell University and President of the University of Maine.

== Career ==
Elliott got his training as a history teacher at Glenville State College and was principal of the Widen, West Virginia, school system from 1939 to 1942. He earned a master's degree from the University of West Virginia. He was a lieutenant commander in the U.S. Naval Reserve during World War II, and earned a PhD in educational administration at the University of Colorado. He became superintendent of schools for Boulder, Colorado, in 1947.

=== University career ===
Elliott became a faculty member at Cornell University in 1948, becoming a professor of educational administration in 1951. On 1 July 1956 he became executive assistant to the President of the University. In 1958 Elliott became President of the University of Maine, awarding President John F. Kennedy an honorary doctorate in October 1963. Elliott resigned in 1965 to become President of GWU, though some faculty members opposed his appointment. He retired in July 1988. His style was gentler than that of his successor Stephen Trachtenberg: a trustee at GWU said that "The conservative guy from West Virginia had been succeeded by the kid from Brooklyn,". Meanwhile, some faculty posited that Elliott had done too little to recruit top faculty and students.

The GWU's School of International Affairs was renamed as the Elliott School of International Affairs in 1988 in his honor. He and his wife established the Evelyn E. and Lloyd H. Elliott Fund, to support a professorship and other activities of the school.

=== Business ===
Elliott served as the board members at American Security Bank, Bell Atlantic, National Geographic Society, Perpetual Building Association and Woodward & Lothrop, and he was included in the Washington Business Hall of Fame in 1990. He was the first president of the National Geographic Society Education Foundation.

== Personal life ==
Elliott was raised in Clay County, West Virginia, where his father was a schoolteacher and ran a farm. Elliott's wife Evelyn, known as Betty, died in the year 2009 aged 91. Together they had two children (Patricia and Gene), two grandchildren ( Ryan and Bevan), and eleven great-grandchildren. He died on January 1, 2013, according to a memo released by the former President of GWU, Steven Knapp, to the entire GWU community.

== Bibliography ==
- Elliott, Lloyd H. Unique partners in progress: the University of Maine and the pulp and paper industry. Volume 34, Issue 8 of Newcomen address, Newcomen Society in North America, 1964, 24pp.
- Elliott, Lloyd H. The university and corporate America: bridging the two worlds. National Heritage Books, 2001
