= Thomas H. Carroll =

Thomas H. Carroll II
- Carroll, c. 1941

13th President of the George Washington University
- In office 1961–1964
- Preceded by: Cloyd H. Marvin
- Succeeded by: Lloyd Hartman Elliott

Personal details
- Born: 12 May 1914 San Francisco, California, U.S.
- Died: 27 July 1964 (aged 50)
- Spouse: Evelyn Elliott

Thomas Henry Carroll II (12 May 1914 – 27 July 1964) was the President of the George Washington University from 1961 to 1964.

== Career ==
Carroll gained degrees from the University of California at Berkeley (Economics and business, 1934) and Harvard Business School, then became an assistant dean at Harvard from 1939 to 1942. He served in the United States Naval Reserve as a lieutenant junior grade during World War II from August 1942 to December 1945. He became Dean of the College of Business Administration at Syracuse University in 1945, and then Dean of the School of Commerce at the University of North Carolina in 1950. He was president of the Harvard Business School Association for 1955-56. He became an Associate Director of the Ford Foundation in November 1953, and became vice-president of the foundation before becoming president of George Washington University in 1961. He was succeeded as president of the university by Lloyd H. Elliott in 1964 following his death.

== Personal life ==
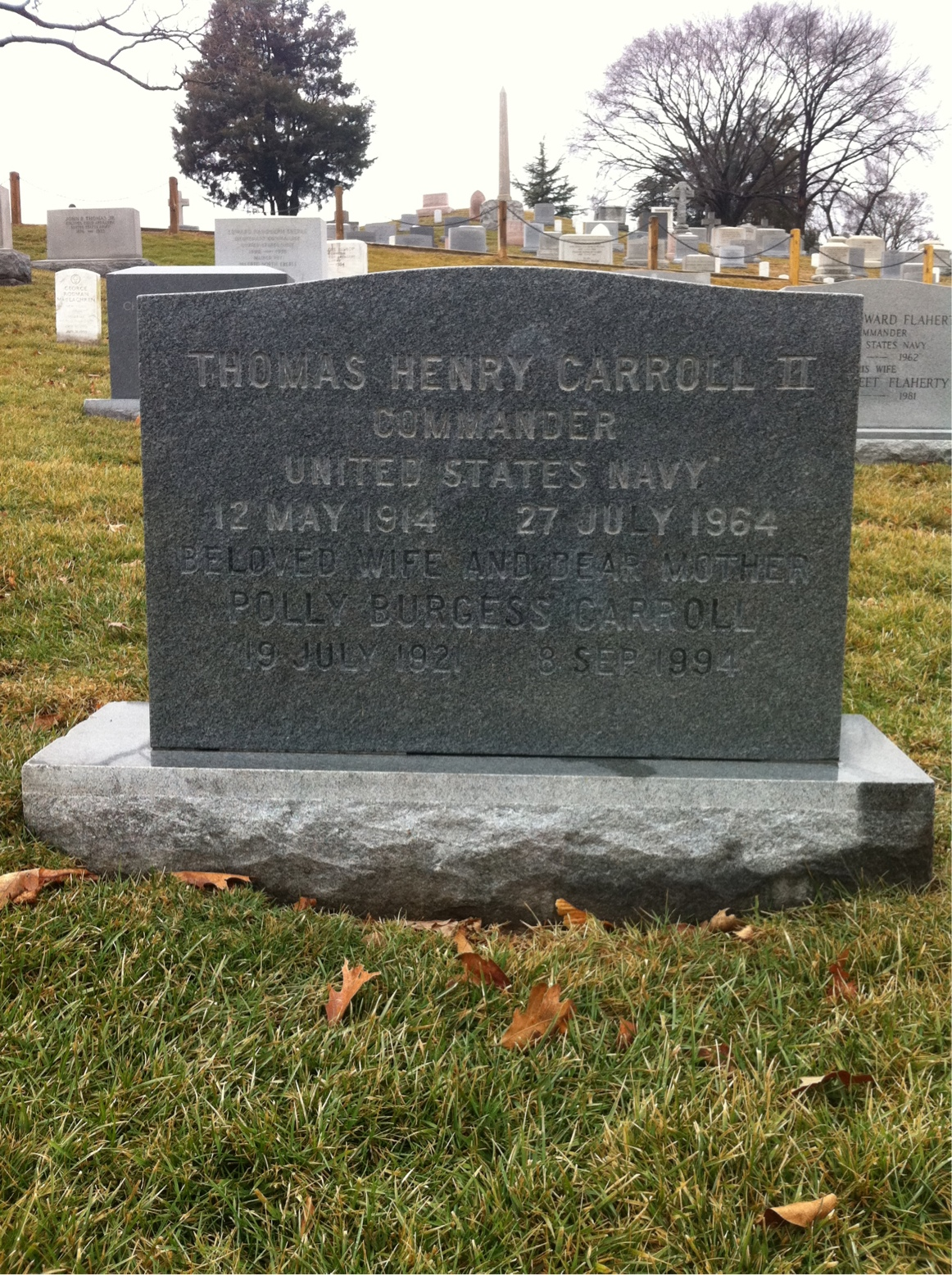
Grave at Arlington National Cemetery

Carroll was born in San Francisco, California. He married Polly Holcolin Burgess in December 1941 and had two sons, Thomas III and Bruce. He died from a heart attack in 1964 and was buried at Arlington National Cemetery. His widow Polly died in 1993.

== Books ==
- Carroll, Thomas H. Business Education for Competence and Responsibility. The American Association of Collegiate Schools of Business, Chapel Hill, University of North Carolina Press, 1954
