= World Affairs Council of Washington, D.C. =

Defunct U.S. nonprofit organization

- Nickname: WACDC
- Formation: 1980
- Dissolved: December 31, 2018
- Headquarters: Washington, DC

The World Affairs Council of Washington, DC, founded in 1980, was a nonprofit, nonpartisan organization in Washington, DC. The group aimed at informing and educating the public about contemporary international affairs. Its corporate sponsors included Aramco Service Company, AIG, Raytheon, and ExxonMobil, and it relied primarily on dues from individual and corporate members. On December 31, 2018, after 38 years in the community, the World Affairs Council - Washington, DC ceased operations. The National Press Club Journalism Institute announced in a shared press release that an agreement with WAC-DC to offer ongoing community support in 2019 and beyond.

== Events ==
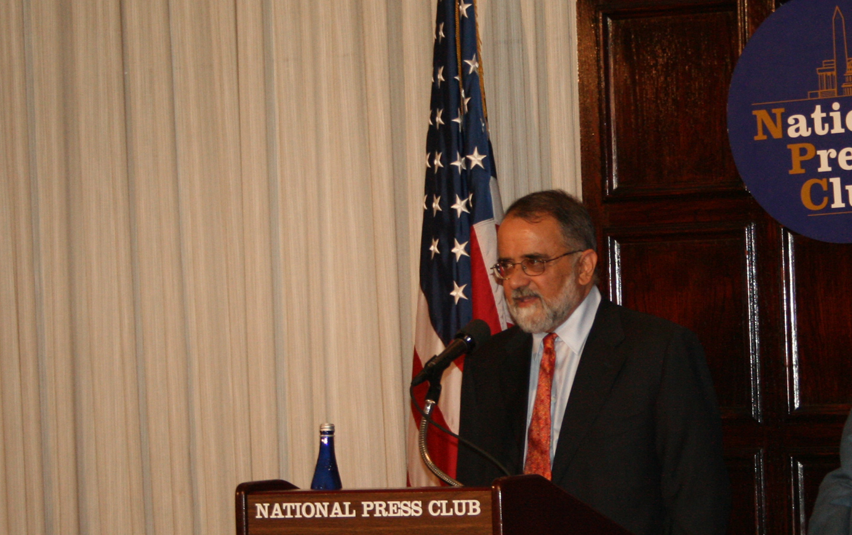
Ahmed Rashid at a WACDC Foreign Affairs Series event.

The World Affairs Council organized events in the D.C. area, providing educational opportunities in international affairs. These events included public programs featuring journalists, public officials, and foreign policy experts, seminars for educators, and outreach programs for students.

== Notable speakers ==
- Shahid Javed Burki - Finance Minister of Pakistan and Vice President of the World Bank.
- Lt. General Kevin P. Byrnes – retired US Army Deputy Chief of Staff for Programs, Director of the Army's Quadrennial Defense Review Efforts.
- Hon. William J. Clinton – former president of the United States.
- General Wesley K. Clark – retired, former NATO Supreme Allied Commander.
- Hon. William Cohen – former secretary of defense.
- Hon. Lorne Craner – former assistant secretary of state, democracy, human rights, and labor, and president of the International Republican Institute.
- Alan M. Dershowitz - Felix Frankfurter Professor of Law at Harvard Law School.
- Thomas L. Friedman - Three-time Pulitzer Prize winner of The New York Times.
- Dr. Harry Harding – former dean of the Elliot School of International Affairs at The George Washington University.
- Jean-Marie Guehenno - United Nations Under-Secretary General for Peacekeeping Operations.
- Dr. Richard Haass - president of the Council on Foreign Relations and former director of policy planning at the US State Department.
- Morton Halperin - director of US Advocacy at the Open Society Institute and senior fellow at the Center for American Progress.
- Dr. Anthony Lake – former US national security advisor.
- Lord Peter Levene - Chairman of Lloyd's of London.
- Hon. John F. Maisto – former permanent representative of the United States to the Organization of American States.
- Dr. Jessica Tuchman Mathews - President of the Carnegie Endowment for International Peace.
- Philip Merrill – former chairman of the Washingtonian.
- Major General William L. Nash – retired, Senior Fellow for Conflict Prevention and Director of the Military Fellows Program at the Council on Foreign Relations.
- Hon. Roger Noriega – former US Assistant Secretary of State.
- Hon. Richard Perle – former Assistant Secretary of Defense and Chairman of the Defense Policy Board Advisory Committee
- H.E. Zoran Jolevski - Macedonian ambassador to the United States and former chief of staff of the president of Macedonia Boris Trajkovski.
- Dr. Anne-Marie Slaughter - Dean of the Woodrow Wilson School of Public and International Affairs at Princeton University.
- Dr. Helmut Sonnenfeldt - Director of the Atlantic Council of the United States.
- Dr. Lawrence H. Summers – former US Secretary of the Treasury and former president of Harvard University.
- Hon. Togo D. West - President of the Joint Center for Political and Economic Studies and former US Secretary of the Army and US Secretary of Veterans Affairs.
- Col. Lawrence Wilkerson – retired, former chief of staff to US Secretary of State Colin Powell.
- James D. Wolfensohn - Ninth president of the World Bank Group.
- Hon. R. James Woolsey - Vice-president of Booz Allen Hamilton and former director of Central Intelligence/
- Gen. Anthony Zinni – retired, former commander at US Central Command.
- General Martin E. Dempsey - Chairman of the Joint Chiefs of Staff
