= Samuel Harrison Greene =

American religious leader (1845–1920)

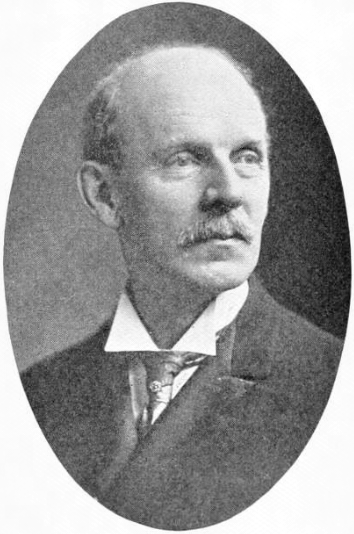
- Born: December 25, 1845; Enosburgh, Vermont, U.S.
- Died: September 7, 1920 (aged 74); Washington, D.C., U.S.
- Burial place: Rock Creek Cemetery; Washington, D.C., U.S.
- Education: Colgate University
- Occupations: Pastor; university president

Samuel Harrison Greene (December 25, 1845 – September 7, 1920) was an American Baptist pastor, church leader, and university official.

== Early life ==
Samuel Harrison Greene was born in Enosburg, Vermont on December 25, 1845. He was educated in local schools. At 21, he was elected as the Superintendent of Schools in Montgomery, Vermont. In 1873, he graduated from Colgate University in Hamilton, New York, and in 1875 from Hamilton Theological Seminary. By right of his descent from Captain John Parker, who led militiamen at the Battle of Lexington, he was a member of the Sons of the American Revolution.

== Pastoral positions ==
In 1875, upon graduation from seminary, Greene became pastor of a Baptist church in Cazenovia, New York. In 1879, he was called to Calvary Baptist Church in Washington, D.C., where he served until his death in 1920.

He led Calvary to become one of the major churches in the nation's capital. Under his leadership, the church grew to over 1700 members and became a model of the Baptist Sunday School movement. In 1903, he gave a lecture to the Southern Baptist Theological Seminary on the Calvary's Sunday School program, which grew to approximately 2300. The secretary of the Southern Baptist Convention's Sunday School Board described Calvary's program as "one of the great Sunday Schools of the world." In 1907, the Northern Baptist Convention had its founding meeting at Calvary, and Greene was elected vice president of the convention. The president of the convention was then New York Governor Charles Evans Hughes who joined Calvary in 1911 after he was appointed Associate Justice of the Supreme Court of the United States.

== Education ==
From 1889 until 1912, Greene served on the Board of Trustees of Columbian University, now the George Washington University. He served as Acting President twice, 1894–1895 and 1900–1902.

== Death ==
Greene died at his home in Washington on September 7, 1920. He was buried at Rock Creek Cemetery.
