= Michael Moran (gymnast) =

American artistic gymnast

- Full name: Michael Moran
- Born: June 27, 1976 (age 50) Hartford, Connecticut, U.S.

Gymnastics career
- Discipline: Men's artistic gymnastics
- Country represented: United States (1995–1996, 1998–1999)
- College team: Temple Owls
- Gym: Tim Daggett's Gold Medal Gymnastics
- Head coach: Fred Turoff
- Former coach: Tim Daggett
- Retired: 2000
Medal record
Representing United States
Men's artistic gymnastics
Event	1st	2nd	3rd
Pan American Games	0	1	0
Total	0	1	0
Pan American Games
Silver medal – second place	1999 Winnipeg	Team

Michael Moran (born June 27, 1976) is a retired American artistic gymnast. He was a member of the United States men's national artistic gymnastics team and won a silver medal at the 1999 Pan American Games. He competed collegiately for the Temple Owls.

== Early life and education ==
Moran was born on June 27, 1976, in Hartford, Connecticut. He grew up in Windsor, Connecticut and started gymnastics at 5 years old. He trained under former Olympic gold medalist Tim Daggett at Tim Daggett's Gold Medal Gymnastics in Agawam, Massachusetts. He attended Windsor High School and graduated before a doing a post-graduate year at Loomis Chaffee School in 1995. He enrolled at Temple University to pursue gymnastics.

== Gymnastics career ==
In 1995, Moran placed first in the all-around at the First Summer Olympic Festival in Rio de Janeiro. He was a member of the Temple Owls men's gymnastics team from 1996 to 2000. Multiple surgeries resulted in Moran missing large portions of his early career. Under Temple coach Fred Turoff, Moran became a six-time conference champion and three-time All-America selection with the Owls.

On the international stage, Moran represented the United States at the 1999 Pan American Games and won a silver medal in the team all-around. He retired from competition in 2000.

== Post-athletic career ==
After retiring from gymnastics competition, Moran worked at Tropicana Casino & Resort Atlantic City and later was a cast member for the touring live action stage show Spider-Man Live!. He started a circus troupe with Temple Owls men's gymnastics teammate Aaron Vexler.

== Awards and honors ==
Moran was inducted into the Temple University Athletics Hall of Fame as part of the Class of 2023.
