= Spider-Man's wedding (live performance) =

1987 performance in New York City, US

- Image that was featured on a special commemorative bag that Mets/Spider-Man fans received at the stadium.
- Venue: Shea Stadium
- Location: Flushing Meadows–Corona Park, Queens, New York City
- Type: Publicity stunt, live performance

Spider-Man's wedding at Shea Stadium in 1987 was a publicity stunt and live performance adaptation of the comic book storyline "The Wedding!" produced by Marvel Comics. The event was meant to advertise the special issue of The Amazing Spider-Man comic book, which went on sale the next Tuesday and took place at home plate in front of more than 45,000 fans just before the New York Mets played the Pittsburgh Pirates.

== Production ==
Mary Jane Watson's dress was designed by Willi Smith and was his last project before his death.

== Event ==
The show follows the comic book story and has Stan Lee officiating it.

== Reception ==
Andy L. Kubai of Looper stated that he originally believed that Marvel held the ceremony at Shea Stadium because they couldn't afford something larger like Yankee Stadium but believed it made more sense after he learned that the character Peter Parker is a Mets fan. Gary Smith of Comic Book Resources stated that he believed that the wedding at Shea Stadium was Marvel's third greatest publicity stunt and that Stan Lee's part was very appropriate.

== Cast and characters ==
- Mary Jane Watson – Tara Shannon
- Spider-Man/Peter Parker
- Hulk
- Captain America
- Ice-Man
- Fire-Star
- Green Goblin
- Dr. Doom

== See also ==
- Spider-Man Live!
- Marvel Universe Live!
- Spider-Man: Turn Off the Dark
