= EAGL =

EAGL may refer to:

- East Atlantic Gymnastics League, an NCAA Division 1 women's gymnastics conference
- EA Graphics Library, a game engine which was created and developed by EA Canada
