= Spider-Man Live! =

Stage show

- Promotional poster for the show.
- Company: Marvel Enterprises, Ideal Entertainment, Ultimate Shows & Entertainment
- Genre: Superheroes
- Show type: Touring arena
- Date of premiere: 9 October 2002
- Location: Mobile

Creative team
- Primary Marvel character creators: Stan Lee & Steve Ditko
- Director: Kevin Shinick
- Writers: Kevin Shinick
- Stunt coordinator: Ottavio Gesmundo
- Costume designer: Wendy Stuart
- Projection designer: Michael Clark
- Scenic designer: Michael Allen

Spider-Man Live! - A Stunt Spectacular was the first full-length, live-action stage show based on the Marvel comic book character, Spider-Man, to appear in the United States.

Written and directed by Kevin Shinick and produced by Ultimate Shows & Entertainment and Marvel Enterprises, Inc, the show combined state of the art flying illusions, acrobatic and trapeze stunts, pyrotechnics and multimedia special effects into a theatrical production that embarked on a 40 city U.S. tour from 2002 - 2003.

== Plot ==
The show portrays Spider-Man's history from the day that he gets bitten by the radioactive spider and throughout his high school years and relationship with Mary Jane Watson. By the end he has to save her from the Green Goblin.

== Cast ==
- Spider-Man - Colin Follenweider, Aaron Vexler, Brian Hite, Jon Bookout
- Peter Parker - Colin Follenweider
- Green Goblin - Gary Martin, Ottavio Gesmundo
- Harry Osborn - Gary Martin
- Mary Jane Watson - Julie Leedes
- J. Jonah Jameson - David Hutson
- Aunt May - Patricia Wilcox
- Crusher - Mike Withycombe
- Sports Commentators - Kevin Shinick, Paul Rubin
- Ring Girl - Janelle DeMarzo
- Henchman - Eric D. Braun, Jon Bookout, Sean Colon
- News Anchor - Sonya Rokes
- Cops - Mike Moran, Naomi Brenkman, Michael Dean
- Professor Mason - Michael Souveroff

== See also ==
- Marvel Universe Live!
- Spider-Man: Turn Off the Dark
- Spider-Man's wedding (live performance)
