= Willi Smith =

American fashion designer (1948–1987)

- Born: Willi Donnell Smith; February 29, 1948; Philadelphia, Pennsylvania, U.S.
- Died: April 17, 1987 (aged 39); New York City, U.S.
- Education: Mastbaum Technical High School; University of the Arts; Parsons The New School for Design
- Occupation: Fashion designer
- Label: WilliWear Limited
- Relatives: Toukie Smith (sister)

Willi Donnell Smith (February 29, 1948 – April 17, 1987) was an American fashion designer. At the time of his death, Smith was regarded as one of the most successful African-American designers in the fashion industry. His company, WilliWear Limited, launched in 1976 and by 1986 grossed over $25 million in sales. After Smith's death, his business partner, Laurie Mallet, continued the line with various designers creating collections. Without Smith, the company floundered and due to financial problems and poor sales, WilliWear Limited ceased production in 1990. WilliWear was the first clothing company to create womenswear and menswear under the same label. The accessibility and affordability of Smith's clothing helped to democratize fashion.

== Early years ==
Smith was born in Philadelphia, Pennsylvania, to Willie Lee Smith, an iron worker, and June Eileen Smith, a homemaker, both of whom were extremely clothes-conscious. Smith's grandmother was the housekeeper for a family that was close with designer Arnold Scaasi, and she helped her grandson get an internship with Scaasi. Smith helped with the design of clothing for Elizabeth Taylor. As a boy, Smith spent hours sketching on the floor of his home and at the Philadelphia Museum College of Art. When reflecting on his childhood, Smith once stated, "I loved to draw and design clothes, and my mother told me I was born to be an artist or designer." After his parents divorced, his grandmother, Gladys Bush, nurtured and motivated Smith to pursue his dreams in design.

== Education ==
Smith studied commercial art at Mastbaum Technical High School and attended Philadelphia Museum College of Art, taking a course in fashion illustration. He then moved to New York City to go to Parsons The New School for Design, the art and design college of The New School. He received two scholarships to fund his studies at Parsons. In 1965, Smith interned for couturier Arnold Scaasi, and began studying fashion design at Parsons in the fall while taking liberal arts classes at New York University. Designer Arthur McGee had served as Smith's mentor.

== Career ==
In 1967, Smith left Parsons and pursued a career designing on his own. He first sought design inspiration from what people wore on the streets of New York. He befriended model Bethann Hardison in 1967 after striking up a conversation about her style on the street. Hardison became the fit model for Smith's designs and a close friend.

From 1969 to 1973, Smith worked as lead designer for the junior sportswear label Digits. Smith met future business partner and lifelong friend Laurie Mallet in 1970 while Mallet was in New York for a holiday break and hired her as his design assistant at Digits in 1971. The following year, 1972, Smith was nominated for the Coty American Fashion Critics’ Award for his work as lead designer at Digits. In 1973, Smith was nominated for the Coty American Fashion Critics' Winnie Award for the second time, and began designing patterns for the commercial pattern company Butterick. Smith resigned from Digits later that same year and Digits went bankrupt shortly after. In 1974, Smith partnered with his sister Toukie Smith and close friend Harrison Rivera-Terreaux to form his own label Willi Smith Designs, Inc. Unfamiliar at the time with the business aspect of running a label, the company struggled and closed a few months later.

Smith continued to design and, in 1976, traveled to Bombay (Mumbai) India with Mallet to produce a small collection of women's separates in natural fibers. The collection was a success, and soon after, Smith and Mallet formed the label WilliWear Ltd., with Mallet as President of the company and Willi Smith as Vice President and lead designer. The first Williwear fashion show was held at the Holly Solomon Gallery in the Spring of 1978 and showcased a collection of garments "influenced by nautical uniforms and Southeast Asian dress." Subsequent WilliWear fashion shows were held in unconventional locations such as Alvin Ailey Studio and the Puck Building.

WilliWear was a massive success, providing chic, stylish clothing for the modern woman, and later men, at affordable prices and in natural fabrics. In 1982, Smith produced the first WilliWear men's collection with Stuart Lazar as Executive Vice President of menswear. Smith also hired Mark Bozek as head of communications for WilliWear that same year. After receiving his fifth Coty Award nomination, Willi Smith won the Coty American Fashion Critics' Award in 1983.

WilliWear produced several hallmark collections from 1982 to 1986, and in 1986 the company reached $25 million in sales. Smith and Mallet further enriched the reputation of the brand through artist collaborations. After Smith's death, on April 17, 1987, Mallet continued to run WilliWear. In 1989, Mallet hired designer Andre Walker to revive the brand. Following a poorly received Fall 1990 collection and loss of sales at the Fifth Avenue store, Williwear filed for Chapter 11 bankruptcy and ceased production in 1990.

== Collaborations ==
Willi Smith was an avid patron of the arts and collaborated with an extensive group of artists from 1973 up until his death in 1987. He designed costumes for choreographer Dianne McIntyre’s productions The Lost Sun (1973), The Deep South Suite (1976), and Take-Off From a Forced Landing (1984). Smith also designed costumes for the Bill T. Jones/Arnie Zane Dance Company’s performance Secret Pastures (1984), as well as for Ellen Stewart's La MaMa Experimental Theatre Club's production Cotton-Club Gala (1985).

Smith and Mallet also collaborated with twenty-one contemporary artists in 1984 to design T-shirts with silk-screened artwork. These T-shirts displayed original work by artists including Keith Haring, Christo, SITE, Suzan Pitt, Les Levine, Edwin Schlossberg, Kim Steele, Jose Gracia Severo, Barbara Kruger, Lynn Hershman, Jenny Holzer, Tod Siler, Dan Friedman, and Andrew "Zephyr" Witten. The shirts were a part of the WilliWear Productions’ collection and video presentation Made in New York (1984). Made in New York, directed by Les Levine, was the first short film project that WilliWear commissioned to present Smith's clothes in motion on the street and to combine the disciplines of art, fashion, and film in one form. In 1985, Smith also worked with Max Vadukul to direct the short film Expedition, which was shot in Senegal and showcased ensembles inspired by Senegalese street fashion. Expedition debuted in New York at the Ziegfeld theater.

Smith showcased his designs through film in Made in New York (1984) and Expedition (1985), as well as for film in Spike Lee’s School Daze (1987), creating the homecoming court costumes. Elements of film were also included in the presentation of the Fall 1983 WilliWear collection "Street Couture", held at the Puck Building, and incorporated video art by Juan Downey, music by Jorge Socarras, and makeup by Linda Mason. The presentation of the Spring 1983 WilliWear collection "City Island", featured video art, which was created by artist Nam June Paik. Other significant WilliWear collections include the Fall 1984 collection "SUB-Urban", Spring 1985 collection "Sightseeing", the 1984 collection for WilliWear Productions’ Made in New York, and the 1985 collection for Expedition. From 1982 to 1987, WilliWear showrooms and boutiques in New York City and London were designed by the conceptual design and architecture studio SITE, led by partners Alison Sky and James Wines. For the WilliWear showroom on 209 W 38th Street in New York City, SITE partnered with Smith and Mallet to design a monochrome streetscape with a sidewalk doubling as a runway and chain-link fencing serving as display racks.

Additionally, Smith designed the suits for Edwin Schlossberg and his groomsmen when he married Caroline Kennedy, in 1986, and designed the wedding dress worn by Mary Jane Watson when she married Peter Parker in a live performance based on The Amazing Spider-Man Annual #21 comic in 1987. Smith also designed the uniforms for the workers on Jeanne-Claude and Christo's 1983 installation Surrounded Islands as well as for Pont Neuf Wrapped (1985) in Paris, France.

== Death ==
On April 16, 1987, Smith was admitted to Mt. Sinai Medical Center in New York City after contracting shigellosis and pneumonia while on a fabric buying trip to India in February 1987. He died of pneumonia complicated by shigellosis the following day at the age of 39. According to Smith's lawyer Edward Hayes, Smith's death was AIDS-related. Smith was apparently unaware that he had contracted the virus and had shown no symptoms. It was only after he was hospitalized that tests revealed he was HIV positive. Mallet later said that while the designer was always "fragile" and often too sick to work, she did not feel that he was seriously ill. When asked if Smith had any idea that he had AIDS, Mallet said that Smith never confided this to her, but she felt "maybe he had some idea, some feeling." Smith's funeral was held on April 20 at the Frank E. Campbell Funeral Chapel in Manhattan, after which his remains were cremated. On May 1, 1987, a memorial service was held for Smith at his alma mater, Parsons The New School for Design.

Smith, who was openly gay, has a panel in the original NAMES Project AIDS Memorial Quilt. Smith is also lamented in a poem "Speak: A Poem for the Millennium March", by Keith Boykin, read by its author for the Millennium March on Washington for Equality on April 29, 2000.

== Legacy ==
Willi Smith was one of the first American designers to create clothing inspired by and for everyday people and what they wore on city streets – making his sportswear a bridge to commercial streetwear. Smith also sourced natural fabrics from India for WilliWear collections. The designer blurred the lines of gendered fashion in American sportswear with garments created for both his WilliWear Men's and Women's collections. Smith also played a key role in the democratization of fashion by keeping WilliWear at an affordable price-point, as well as by partnering with pattern companies Butterick and McCall's to produce home sewing patterns of his collections. He sought not to target an exclusive clientele with his work, but instead to ensure that his clothing could be worn by people from varied backgrounds. Smith's label WilliWear set the stage for later streetwear brands such as FUBU and WalkerWear. Smith's gender-neutral collections for WilliWear can be seen as precursors for contemporary gender-neutral brands such as One DNA and the Phluid Project. Smith's influence can also be seen in brands such as Supreme, Off-White, Telfar, Vaquera, Eckhaus Latta and Pyer Moss.

Additionally, many young designers and artists worked at WilliWear before launching their own successful careers and labels, including Antthony Mark Hankins, James Mischka, Jon Coffelt, John Bartlett, and Andre Walker, among many others. While WilliWear was very successful, the company had experienced creative, quality, and merchandising problems in the year before Smith's death. In an effort to remedy these problems, Smith's business partner Laurie Mallet hired a new staff and brought in additional designers in an effort to appeal to a more sophisticated demographic. After Smith's death, Mallet vowed to continue the line. In late 1987 and 1988, she opened WilliWear stores in Paris and New York City (a London location was opened before Smith's death which proved to be very successful). However, Mallet struggled to maintain the success the line had when Smith was alive. By 1989, sales had decreased. In November 1989, Mallet hired then up and coming designer Andre Young to design the line's Fall 1990 collection. Upon its debut in April, the line was panned by critics. To save money, Mallet closed the WilliWear stores and tried to generate revenue by convincing chain stores to carry the line. Mallet's efforts failed and, in 1990, the women's division of WilliWear ceased production. Shortly thereafter, the men's division also ceased production.

== Exhibitions ==
In 1981, Willi Smith participated in the Black Fashion Museum’s Bridal Gowns of Black Designers exhibition. He designed a two-piece wedding ensemble consisting of “a rajah style jacket in cotton satin and velveteen jodhpurs,” which was prominently displayed during the show. The following year, Smith participated in the Project Space One (MoMA PS1) exhibition Art As Damaged Goods. Smith and Mallet also collaborated with local art galleries, which hosted early WilliWear and WilliWear Productions fashion shows. The line of artist T-shirts for WilliWear Productions was first exhibited at the Ronald Feldman Gallery, then during the Artventure fundraiser hosted at AREA by the Public Art Fund in 1984.

Cooper Hewitt, Smithsonian Design Museum hosted the first retrospective exhibition on Willi Smith from March 13, 2020. The show was scheduled to end on October 25, 2020. The exhibition was curated by Alexandra Cunningham Cameron, Curator of Contemporary Design, and Hintz Secretarial Scholar at Cooper Hewitt with Curatorial Assistants Julie Pastor and Darnell Jamal Lisby. The collaborative and accessible nature of Willi Smith's work was highlighted through the exhibition and will be incorporated to a greater extent through the Willi Smith Digital Community Archive, which the public can contribute to. The archive serves as a resource for scholars and enthusiasts to gain greater insight and understanding into the life, work, and legacy of the visionary American designer. Due to the coronavirus pandemic, the exhibit was closed at the end of its opening day.

== Awards ==
- Smith earned two scholarships to attend Parsons School of Design in 1965.
- In September 1983, Smith won an American Fashion Critics' Coty Award for women's fashion. He was the second African American designer to win the award, the first being Stephen Burrows.
- In 1985, Smith won a Cutty Sark Men's Fashion Award.
- In 1988, then New York City mayor David Dinkins proclaimed February 23 "Willi Smith Day" in honor of the designer's achievements.
- In 2002, Smith was honored with a bronze plaque for Fashion Walk of Fame along Seventh Avenue.
