= Hail to the Buff and Blue =

"Hail to the Buff and Blue" is the official fight song of the George Washington University Revolutionaries athletic teams. The song is played daily at 12:15 p.m. and 6:00 p.m. by the bells located atop Corcoran Hall on the University Yard.

== History ==
The song was composed in 1924 by then-student Eugene F. Sweeney for a contest to choose a new fight song. The University had recently changed its colors from orange and blue to buff and blue, and the original fight song, Orange and Blue, had become obsolete. Patrick M. Jones re-wrote the fight song in 1989, creating the current version taught to incoming freshmen at Colonial Inauguration and played at athletic events.
