= George Washington Revolutionaries swimming and diving =

Swimming and diving teams of George Washington University

- University: George Washington University
- Conference: Atlantic 10
- Location: Washington, District of Columbia, US
- Nickname: Revolutionaries
- Colors: Buff and blue

Men's Conference Champions
- 2017, 2018, 2019, 2021, 2022, 2023, 2024, 2025

Women's Conference Champions
- 2020, 2022, 2023, 2024, 2025

The George Washington Revolutionaries swimming and diving program represents the George Washington University in the aquatics sports of swimming and diving. The program includes separate men's and women's teams, both of which compete in Division I of the National Collegiate Athletic Association (NCAA) and the Atlantic 10 Conference (A-10).

== History ==
The GW swim & dive men's team has won the Atlantic 10 championship eight times: 2017, 2018, 2019, 2021, 2022, 2023, 2024, and 2025. The women's team has won the A-10 championship five times: 2020, 2022, 2023, 2024, and 2025.

From 2017 to 2025, the men's team is amidst a dynasty within the A-10, having won five consecutive titles within that span and eight titles in nine years. The women's team is also in a dynasty between 2020 and 2025, with a run of four consecutive titles and five titles in six seasons.
