= The Wedding! =

Comic book story

- Cover of The Amazing Spider-Man Annual vol. 1, 21, art by John Romita Sr.
- Publisher: Marvel Comics
- Publication date: 1987
- Genre: Romance; Superhero
- Main character(s): Spider-Man; Mary Jane Watson

Creative team
- Writer(s): Jim Shooter; David Michelinie
- Penciller: Paul Ryan
- Inker: Vince Colletta
- Letterer: Rick Parker
- Colorist: Bob Sharen

"The Wedding!" is a story from The Amazing Spider-Man Annual #21 in which Mary Jane Watson and Peter Parker (a.k.a. Spider-Man) get married. It was published in 1987 and written by David Michelinie, featuring cover art by John Romita Sr.

== Plot ==
Spider-Man is web slinging through town and runs into Electro. He defeats him and then returns home, to find Mary Jane in the process of moving in. MJ leaves for a photo shoot, leaving Peter to ponder how on earth he'll be able to provide for him and MJ.

Peter takes his photos of Spider-Man defeating Electro to the Daily Bugle and is surprised by the staff with a party in honor of his upcoming wedding to Mary Jane. J. Jonah Jameson arrives, clearly irritated, and starts to complain about why they are hosting a party when they're supposed to be working. As soon as Peter leaves, he states that he wants to cut the pay of everyone who didn't attend.

Peter is barely able to sleep that night, contemplating his impending wedding. The next day he meets Mary Jane. He leaps to the ceiling and goes down to one knee, asking her to marry him once again. "I hate cleaning footprints off the ceiling," she responds with a smile. They both eat, but can't help shake their worries about the wedding. Mary Jane leaves for a meeting, where her old boyfriend presents her with two tickets to Paris, that she can only take if she skips the wedding. Peter goes to Aunt May's house, and goes through a scrap book, remembering his most prominent times with Mary Jane. MJ and her aunt arrive, and they announce the upcoming marriage to their family. She leaves in a Ferrari with her ex-boyfriend, and Peter takes the subway home. Both are starting to have second thoughts about their marriage. When they meet up again that night, Spidey takes MJ out web-slinging to clear their heads.

The next day, Peter's best man, Flash Thompson, and his best friend, Harry Osborn, take Peter out for a bachelor party, but he's beginning to show his true feelings about the wedding. They try to convince him that love conquers all. Meanwhile, Mary Jane is having a grand party across town. Peter finally decides to go home for the night, and has nightmares about all of his enemies trying to attack MJ, and being helpless to stop them. He wakes up in a sweat, wondering what he should do. Meanwhile, MJ is out with Liz Allan, wondering the same.

Later at City Hall, all of the guests are in attendance (for reasons unknown, Matt Murdock is not present), but both Peter and Mary Jane are late, leaving everyone confused. At the last minute, they both appear and are married by Mary Jane's uncle, judge Spenser Watson. (MJ's wedding dress was designed by real-life designer Willi Smith.) MJ gives Peter the tickets to France with which her ex-boyfriend tried to tempt her, and they go off on their honeymoon to begin their new life together, as Mr. and Mrs. Parker. The wedding occurred simultaneously in the Spider-Man comic and in the daily news strip.

== Background ==
Stan Lee, who co-created Spider-Man and was writing the Spider-Man newspaper strip at the time, recounted:

I suggested [that Spider-Man and Mary Jane be married] to whoever was in charge, and they thought it was a good idea, too. Now, I wanted to find a way to have them get married in the comics books and the newspaper strip at the same time. There is no way I can explain to you how difficult that was, because the comics books are written two or three months ahead, [and] the newspaper strip is written a certain period of time ahead. To synchronize the two was almost impossible. Also, the Spider-Man strip had one storyline going on, and in the newspaper strip we had a totally different storyline going on, and in order to make them sort of come together so there'd be a marriage... well, it was the toughest thing creatively that I think I have ever done or the people at Marvel had done. [emphasis in original]

Marvel's promotion director Steve Saffel came up with the idea of having a famous fashion designer make the design for Mary Jane's dress. The newspaper strip version of the wedding was dedicated to designer Willi Smith, who died shortly after designing Mary Jane's wedding gown.

== Other versions ==
There have been several references, variants and adaptations of The Wedding!.

=== MC2 ===
In the MC2 timeline, Peter and Mary Jane remain happily married, and the annual remains part of its continuity. Unlike the 616 version, May Parker died of natural causes in Amazing Spider-Man Issue 400, and Mary Jane's daughter Mayday Parker survived a difficult delivery; although her death was initially faked by Norman Osborn, she was eventually returned to the Parkers.

=== UK continuity ===
The U.K based The Spectacular Spider-Man comic revealed that, in their future history, Peter and Mary Jane are married and have a daughter, Mayday Parker, who is currently active as Spider-Girl. Peter reveals to his daughter that he lost his leg in battle, making this timeline the second to carry the MC2 explanation for Peter electing to put his costumed identity behind him.

=== Newspaper comic ===
Spider-Man married in the newspaper strip the same time as he did in the comic book. The strip underwent a vanilla reboot (a reboot of an existing timeline without a real explanation for the changes based in the storylines), restoring Peter Parker to an unmarried young man. The strip went on to reveal that it was now reflecting the "current storyline" in the Amazing Spider-Man title. Peter now lives alone in a renovated apartment, attends college, and dates long-time best friend Mary Jane whenever she is available. The current timeline of the rebooted strip is set "in the days before Peter and Mary Jane were married". This confirmed that the newspaper strip's previous canon had not been compromised and that the present day timeline was on hold. The marriage was restored to the dailies, the previous storyline involving Electro having been revealed to be a dream. The revelation dawns on Peter as MJ walks out of the shower, paying homage to the infamous cliffhanger of Dallas involving the return of Patrick Duffy as Bobby Ewing. The couple have now been married for over 30 years in the newspaper strip.

=== What If? ===
In What If? (Volume 2) #20 and #21, the reader is presented with a variant version of the classic issue, in which Peter had not married Mary Jane, but instead he married the Black Cat, the marriage ends in tragedy with the death of Black Cat and Peter and Mary Jane going separate ways, but at the end seemed to lead to a possible relationship between Silver Sable and Spider-Man. Another version was also seen in What If? (Volume 1) #24 - "What if Spider-Man had Rescued Gwen Stacy?". In this issue, Peter ends up marrying Gwen Stacy, but the wedding is interrupted by Jameson, who has been given evidence that proves that Peter is Spider-Man that was mailed to him by Norman Osborn, who seemed to be reformed later.

=== Universe X ===
In the Universe X alternate timeline, Peter is shown (while under a hypnotic influence by Spiders-Man) marrying Gwen Stacy and not Mary Jane. Meanwhile, Mary Jane ends up marrying Harry Osborn. In reality, Mary Jane had died, leaving Peter to raise May on his own and in a state of depression. Later in life, May becomes the host of the Venom symbiote, much to Peter's chagrin.

== In other media ==
=== Television ===
- In the first episode of Spider-Man: The Animated Series Season 5, "The Wedding", Peter and Mary Jane (or rather, her clone) attend their wedding only to have it interrupted by the Green Goblin, who attempts to get Mary Jane to marry him. The attendees at the wedding were Peter, Mary Jane, Liz Allan, Flash Thompson, Debra Whitman, Felicia Hardy, Wilson Fisk, Robbie Robertson, J. Jonah Jameson, Anna Watson, May Parker, Harry Osborn, Curt Connors, Mrs. Connors, the Scorpion, and others who were not named. Unlike the comics version, their honeymoon was in Niagara Falls and not Paris.

=== Live performance ===
- Spider-Man's wedding was performed in 1987 as a live action tie-in held at Shea Stadium, and also featured an introduction by Stan Lee.

== Parodies ==
=== Marvel Zombies ===
The Marvel Zombies #5 cover is a parody of The Wedding!. It depicts a zombie variant of Spider-Man holding Mary Jane's half-eaten corpse, the heroes and villains in the background are decaying, and the Spider-Man shaped heart in the background has a bite taken out of it.

=== The Simpsons ===
The Simpsons shows a parody of the cover of the original comic after Comic Book Guy gets married (S25E10).

== Trade paperback collections ==
A trade paperback, The Amazing Spider-Man: The Wedding (ISBN 0-87135-770-4) was published in October 1991, collecting the comic book wedding storyline from The Amazing Spider-Man #290-292 (July-Sept. 1987), The Amazing Spider-Man Annual #21 (1987), and Not Brand Echh #6 (Feb. 1968). It also reprinted the newspaper strip wedding, and the media tie-in live action wedding held at Shea Stadium.

In 2005 a wedding themed trade paperback called Marvel Weddings (ISBN 0785116869) was published. This collected FANTASTIC FOUR #150 and FANTASTIC FOUR ANNUAL #3, INCREDIBLE HULK #319, AVENGERS #59-60 and #127, AMAZING SPIDER-MAN ANNUAL #21 and X-MEN #30.
