= Arthur Johnson (athletic director) =

American college athletics director

Current position
- Title: Athletic director
- Team: Temple
- Conference: AAC

Biographical details
- Education: Georgia

Administrative career (AD unless noted)
- 1996–1999: Arizona State (manager of football operations)
- 1999: North Carolina (administrative assistant for football operations)
- 1999–2005: Texas (assistant athletics director for football operations/special assistant to the head football coach)
- 2005–2011: Georgia (associate athletics director)
- 2011–2014: Texas (senior associate athletics director for football operations)
- 2014–2021: Texas (senior associate athletics director for administration and operations)
- 2021–present: Temple

Arthur Johnson is the vice president and athletic director of the Temple Owls of Temple University since 2021.

== Personal life ==
Arthur Johnson was raised in Thomasville, Georgia. He married T'Leatha Johnson and they have a son, Aaron together. Johnson earned his bachelor's and master's degrees from the University of Georgia.

== Early career ==
Johnson started his career at Arizona State University as the manager of football operations before heading to North Carolina Tar Heels to serve as their Administrative Assistant for Football Operations

=== First Stint at Texas ===
Johnson first joined Texas advising John Mackovic and Mack Brown, the head coaches for the Longhorn's Football program while serving in the front office as the Assistant Athletics Director.

=== Georgia ===
Johnson left Texas to return to his alma mater as the Associate Athletics Director where he provided leadership on capital programs.

=== Second Stint at Texas ===
He returned to Texas to serve as the senior associate athletics director for football operations in 2011 before he was ultimately promoted to senior director for administration and operations where he was involved in capital programs like the Moody Center.

=== Temple ===
New president of Temple University, Jason Wingard named Johnson as the next athletic director at Temple on October 6, 2021. His first big move was hiring Texas associate head coach Stan Drayton as the new football coach of the Owls.
