= Antthony Mark Hankins =

American fashion designer

Antthony Mark Hankins (born November 10, 1968) is an American fashion designer who founded Antthony Mark Hankins Inc. in 1994. By his mid-twenties he had built his own $40 million business and was named by Newsweek as one of the top 100 people to watch in America.

== Early life ==
Antthony has been featured in Business Week Magazine (November 1997), The Wall Street Journal (October 1995) and numerous other publications as a success story of a poor, African-American boy from a New Jersey factory town.

He was born in Elizabeth, New Jersey, to Mary Jane and Ramone Moya. He is the youngest of seven children and has a twin sister. His parents divorced when Antthony was young and at the age of twelve his mother remarried.

He attended art classes and sewing classes at Roosevelt Middle School in Roselle. In his free time he designed clothing for friends and colleagues. His first sewing machine cost $150 which he had loaned from a friend at the Elizabeth's Union County courthouse where he worked part-time as an administrative assistant.

== Education and career ==
=== Early life ===
His portfolio of pieces was the key to securing an interview to attend the Pratt Institute's School of Design in Brooklyn, New York, from 1986 to 1988. Shortly after he graduated, at the age of nineteen, he was accepted at the École de la chambre syndicale de la couture parisienne in Paris, France as the second American and first African-American student.

To earn the $10,000 tuition and secure a plane ticket to Paris, Antthony contacted Christy Ferer, a fashion correspondent with the Today Show to help get him exposure. They agreed to do a two part piece the latter of which was shot in Paris and aired December 9, 1988. The national exposure opened doors for Antthony and from it an anonymous donation came in the mail which allowed him to secure a plane ticket to Paris.

From 1988 to 1989 Antthony continued to expand his education in fashion in Paris at the École de la Chambre Syndicale de la Couture Parisienne and is numbered among alumni including Karl Lagerfeld and Yves Saint Laurent.

The Chambre Syndicale governs the Paris fashion houses, setting the standards and rules of the industry. The school was founded in 1929 by the Chambre Syndicale to provide talent and skilled labor for the Paris design houses.

As a student, Anthony Mark Hankins apprenticed with Yves Saint Laurant in Paris (1988–1990). Later, he also apprenticed for Adrienne Vittadini, Willi Smith (1986), Michael Paris, and Homer Layne (1987).

During that time it was at an interview with Bob Mackie, an Emmy winning designer for shows like Carol Burnett Show and The Sonny & Cher Comedy Hour, which pointed him towards the ready-to-wear mass market.

=== Antthony Originals ===
At the age of 21, returning to the United States in 1992, Anthony Mark Hankins joined JCPenney Corporation in California as the Quality Assurance Manager. Leveraging his fashion expertise, Hankins quickly advanced within the company. Within two months, he was promoted to the position of in-house designer in the Minority Supplier Development Division at JCPenney's corporate headquarters in Dallas.

Antthony left JCPenney in 1994 when he founded Ramone Moya Ltd. which was the umbrella company for the AMH Group and Antthony Mark Hankins Inc. JCPenney agreed to carry his initial line. The first article about the company ran in the July 2, 1994, issue of the Dallas Morning News headlined "Breaking Out of the Pattern" written by Maria Halkias.

Once his exclusivity with JCPenney expired he also marketed to Target with his line called "Authentics" and Kmart with "Anjalise." His ready to wear collections were also featured in Nordstrom and Sears. By 1996 he had revenues of $40 million in annual sales.

All of Antthony's designs are created in the United States. He has had success selling worldwide in PX stores for the Army and Air Force Exchange Service (AAFES).

He was next approached by Black Entertainment Television to do a home-shopping program called BET Shop which had a direct connection to the Home Shopping Network. On March 31, 1996, he had his first appearance on HSN. He is now in his 30th year as a designer on the Home Shopping Network for ready-wear-fashions.

== Fashion labels ==
- Home Shopping Network

In addition to HSN The Antthony Design Studio collection is sold in department stores and boutiques across the nation.

- Couture Collection

This is a collection of social dresses and separates. All designs are all handcrafted in the United States.

- Band of Artists

A limited series of accessories launched in 2010.

=== Fashion labels ===
- Antthony Originals – HSN
- Anthtony – Couture Collection
- The Signature Collection of Anthony Mark Hankins – major department stores
- Authentics by Anthony Mark Hankins – target department stores
- Butterick Patterns launched July 1995
- TonyWear – Hudson Bay Stores / Canada
- Shopping with Anthony – HSN
- The "A” Label for Antthony Mark Hankins
- Band of Artists

== Recognition ==
=== Awards ===
- "Young Star Award"- 1997: Trumpet Awards/Turner Broadcasting

Designed a couture item for the 1995 recipients

- 100 Top People to Watch in the Millennium – 1997: Newsweek
- Entrepreneur of the Year – 1997: Business Week
- Linden New Day Associates – 1996
- Black Retail Action Group (BRAG) – 1996

Non-profit organization dedicated to promoting the acceptance of African-Americans and other minorities at all levels of retail and related industries.

- City Proclamations

Dallas, Texas; Wichita, Kansas; Elizabeth, New Jersey; Tulsa, Oklahoma
