= George Washington Revolutionaries =

Athletic teams of George Washington University

- University: George Washington University
- Conference: Atlantic 10 Conference (primary); MAWPC (water polo); East Atlantic Gymnastics League
- NCAA: Division I
- Athletic director: Michael Lipitz
- Location: Washington, D.C. Arlington, Virginia
- Varsity teams: 20 teams (8 men, 12 women)
- Basketball arena: Charles E. Smith Center
- Baseball stadium: Barcroft Park
- Softball stadium: Mount Vernon Athletic Fields
- Soccer stadium: Mount Vernon Athletic Fields
- Rowing venue: Thompson Boat Center
- Other venues: GW Swim Center; GW Tennis Center
- Mascot: George
- Nickname: Revolutionaries
- Fight song: "Hail to the Buff and Blue"
- Colors: Buff and blue
- Website: gwsports.com

The George Washington Revolutionaries are the athletic teams of George Washington University of Washington, D.C. The Revolutionaries compete in Division I of the National Collegiate Athletic Association (NCAA) as members of the Atlantic 10 Conference for most sports.

A charter member of the Atlantic 10 Conference, GW is the oldest university in the conference, having been founded in 1821, and the lone remaining charter member. In its history, GW Athletics has seen teams advance to NCAA postseason play 102 times, and earned a combined 104 conference championships. With an average GPA of 3.4, the Department of Athletics sees a 94% Graduation Success Rate among its 400+ student-athletes.

Formerly known as the George Washington Colonials, the Revolutionaries moniker was announced by Chuck Todd on May 24, 2023.

While most teams play their home games in D.C., some teams, including GW baseball, call neighboring Arlington, Virginia home.

== Sports sponsored ==
Men's sports	Women's sports
Baseball	Basketball
Basketball	Cross country
Cross country	Gymnastics
Golf	Lacrosse
Outdoor track and field	Rowing
Soccer	Soccer
Swimming and diving	Softball
Water polo	Swimming and diving
	Tennis
	Track and field^{†}
	Volleyball
† – Women's track and field includes both indoor and outdoor

=== Baseball ===
The GW Revolutionaries baseball team is a varsity intercollegiate athletic team of George Washington University. The team is a member of the Atlantic 10 Conference, which is part of the National Collegiate Athletic Association's Division I. The team plays its home games at Tucker Field in Barcroft Park, Arlington, Virginia. The Revolutionaries are coached by Gregg Ritchie.

George Washington's first baseball team was fielded in 1891.

=== Men's basketball ===
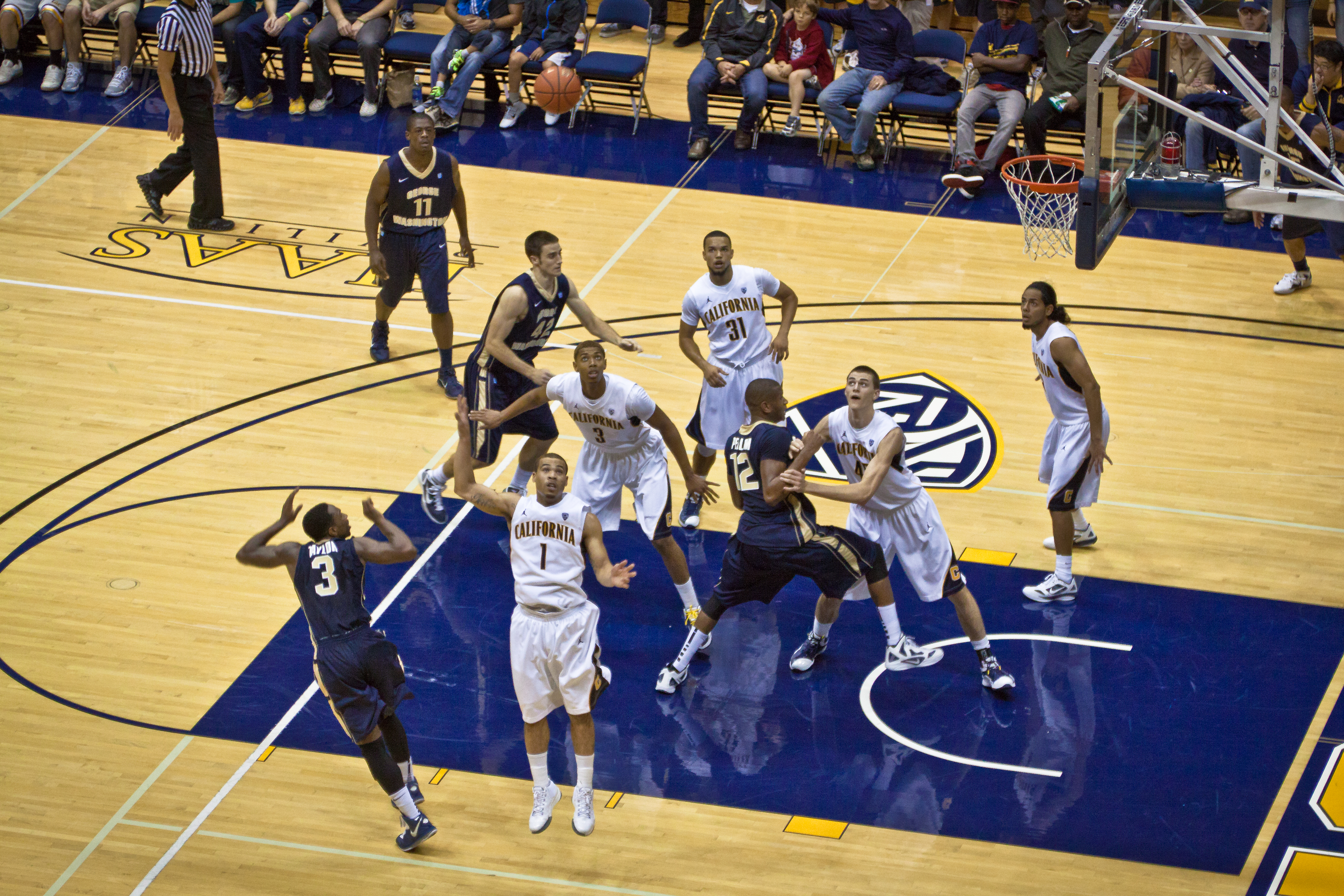
GWU v Cal men's game in 2011

The GW Revolutionaries men's basketball team plays its home games in the Charles E. Smith Center, which is also shared with other GW Revolutionaries athletic programs. The team competes in the Atlantic 10 Conference. It has participated in the NCAA Division I men's basketball tournament 11 times (1954, 1961, 1993, 1994, 1996, 1998, 1999, 2005, 2006, 2007, 2014) and the National Invitational Tournaments (NIT) 6 times (1991, 1995, 1997, 2004, 2015, 2016), winning the 2016 NIT Tournament. In 2025, GW competed in Fox Sports' inaugural postseason tournament, The Crown, in Las Vegas. The Revolutionaries' head coach is Chris Caputo.

=== Women's basketball ===
The George Washington women's basketball team also plays its home games in the Charles E. Smith Center. Coached by Ganiyat Adeduntan, women's basketball is GW's most decorated sport, having won seven Atlantic 10 Tournaments, made 18 appearances in the NCAA Tournament, advanced to four Sweet Sixteens and the Elite Eight in 1997. WNBA MVP and Finals MVP Jonquel Jones is an alumna of the program.

=== Women's lacrosse ===
George Washington Revolutionaries women's lacrosse
- Founded: 2002; 24 years ago
- University: George Washington University
- Head coach: Colleen McCaffrey
- Conference: A-10
- Location: Washington, District of Columbia
- Nickname: Revolutionaries
- Colors: Buff and blue

Conference Regular Season championships
- 2007

The George Washington Revolutionaries women's lacrosse team was fielded in 2002.

As part of a new athletic funding plan passed on June 15, 1998 by the George Washington University Board of Trustees, women's lacrosse was added as a varsity sport.

George Washington played its first women's lacrosse season in 2002.

In 2007, George Washington went 11-7 overall and 6-1 in conference play and was Atlantic 10 regular season champions alongside the Richmond Spiders.

=== Soccer ===
The GW Revolutionaries men's soccer team competes in NCAA Division I in the A-10 (Atlantic 10 Conference). The program began in 1967 and has earned two A-10 Championships in 2002 and 2004 and two regular-season A-10 titles in 1992 and 2011. The team made it to the NCAA Tournament three times, including the Round of Sweet 16 in 1989.

The GW Revolutionaries men's soccer team has won the DC College Cup twice, in 2007 and 2008. The cup is a competition between four Washington, D.C. universities, including George Mason University, American University, and Howard University.

GW's women's soccer team also competes in the Atlantic 10 Conference, and was once captained by former Athletics Director and Head Coach Tanya Vogel, who is also a member of the GW Athletics Hall of Fame.

=== Women's gymnastics ===
The women's gymnastics team is coached by Stephanie Stoicovy. Stoicovy is an alumna of the program and competed under Margie Foster Cunningham, who was GW's head coach for 39 years prior to her retirement in 2024.

=== Men's and women's swimming & diving ===
The swimming & diving programs at GW are the most dominant teams in the A-10. The men's program has won eight of the last nine titles since 2017, while the women's team has won five of the last six championships.

=== Men's and women's cross country/track and field ===
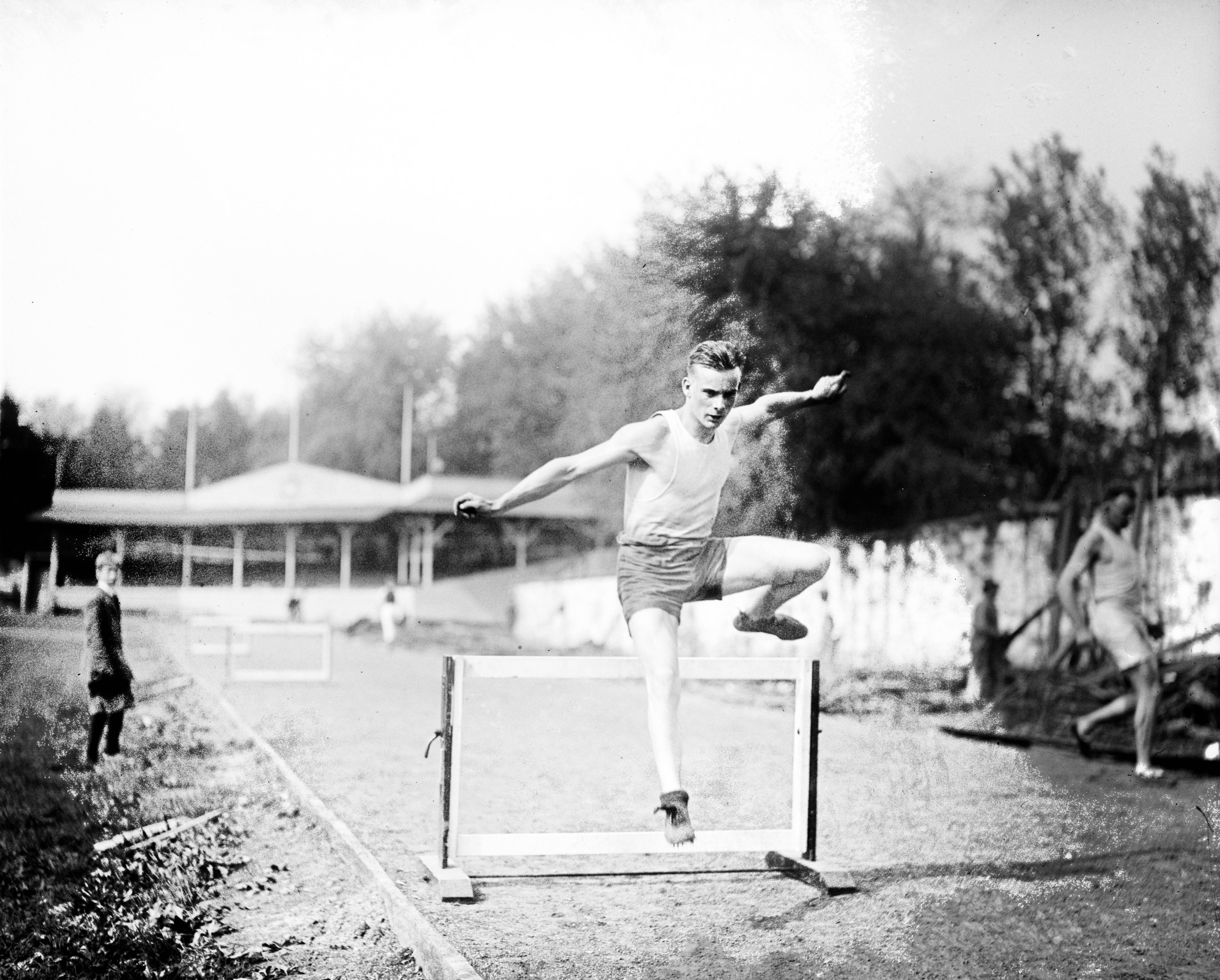
Athlete J.F. Freeney competing in 1921

The men's and women's track and field program is coached by Terry Weir, and assisted by Samantha Nadel, an accomplished runner in her own right. George Washington competes in the Atlantic-10 conference. The women's cross country team won the Atlantic 10 Championship in 2021.

=== Volleyball ===
The volleyball program at GW boasts the NCAA's all-time leader in kills, Svetlana Vtyurina, who was inducted into the Hall of Fame at GW in 2003.

=== Other leagues in which GW competes ===
The gymnastics team competes as a member of the East Atlantic Gymnastics League. The men's water polo team compete as members of the Mid-Atlantic Water Polo Conference.

== Discontinued teams ==
In July 2020, George Washington University announced plans to drop seven sports to help offset an estimated $200 million budget shortfall amid economic fallout due to the COVID-19 pandemic. Three NCAA-sponsored sports (men’s indoor track, men’s tennis, and women’s water polo), and four non-NCAA sponsored sports (men’s rowing, men’s and women’s squash, and sailing) were discontinued.

=== Football ===
George Washington University's football program ran from 1881 to 1966.

The final George Washington game came on Thanksgiving Day in 1966, when the team lost to Villanova, 16–7. GW ended the season with a 4–6 record (conference: 4–3) and Jim Camp was named Southern Conference Coach of the Year. On January 19, 1967, the board of trustees voted to end the football program. Poor game attendance and the expense of the program contributed to the decision. A former GW player, Harry Ledford, believed that most people were unwilling to commute into Washington, D.C., which did not have a metro rail at the time, on Friday nights to Robert F. Kennedy Memorial Stadium. Additionally, the nearby football teams of the University of Maryland and the University of Virginia were nationally competitive, and drew potential suburban spectators away from GW.

== Facilities ==
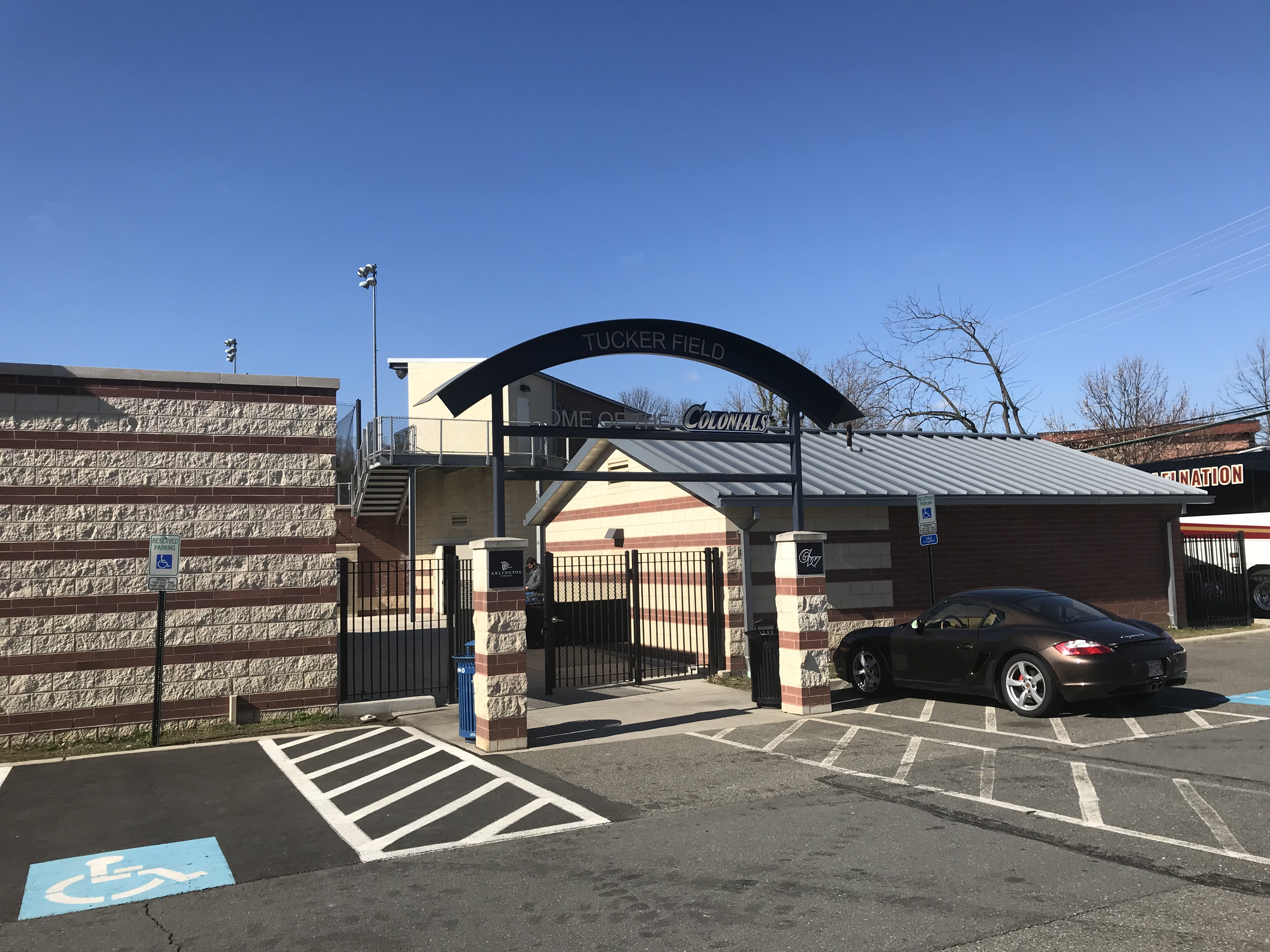
Barcroft Park

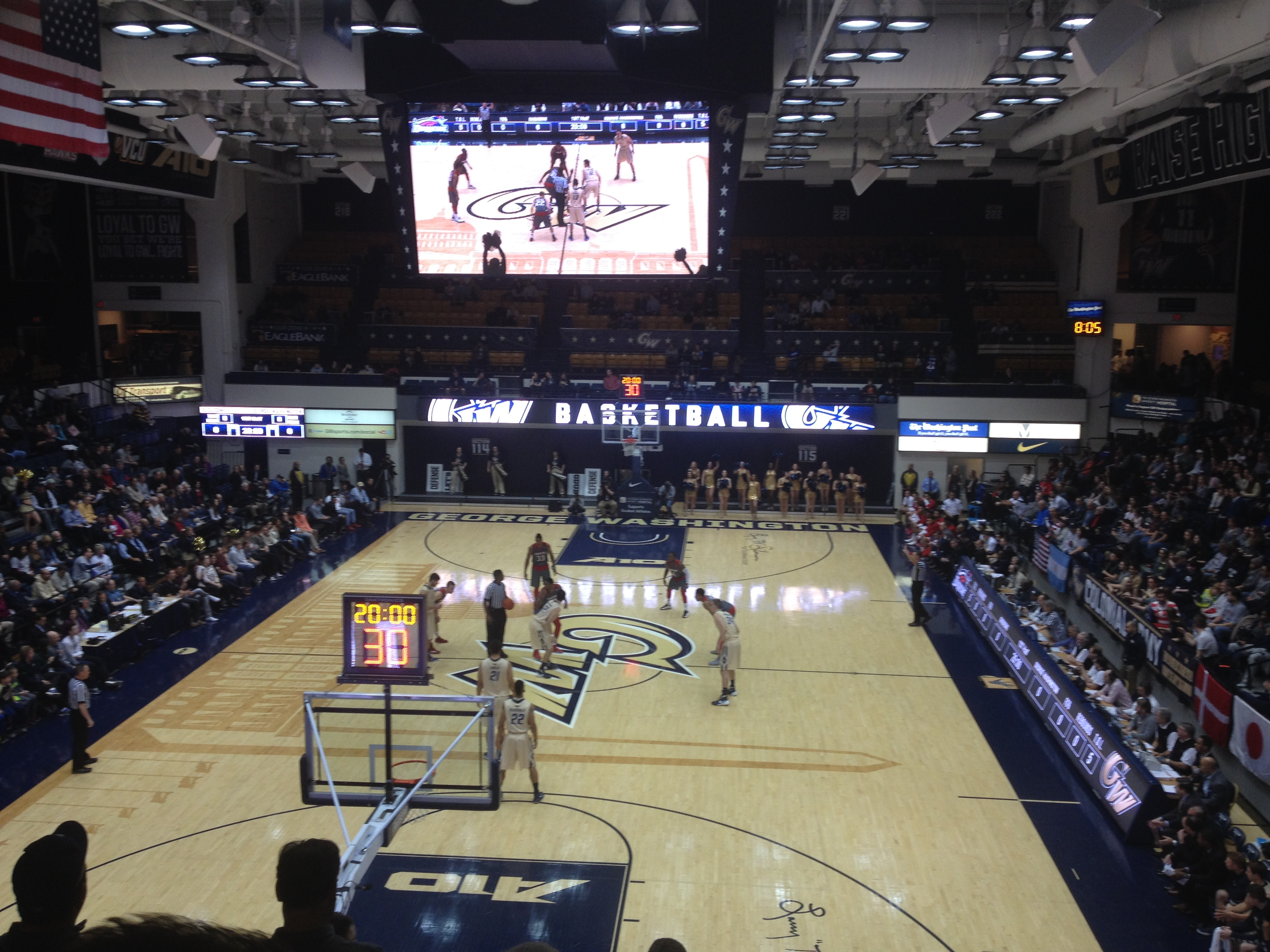
Charles E. Smith Center

Venue	Sport
Barcroft Park	Baseball
Charles E. Smith Center	Basketball; Volleyball; Water polo Gymnastics
Laurel Hill Club	Golf
Mount Vernon Athletic Fields	Soccer; Lacrosse; Softball
Thompson Boat Center	Rowing
GW Swim Center	Swimming
GW Tennis Center	Tennis
