= Andre Walker (designer) =

Fashion designer (born 1965)

Andre Walker (born 1965) is a British-born fashion designer. Walker emerged from the downtown New York fashion scene in the 1980s. Known for his eclectic style and avant-garde silhouettes, former Vogue creative director André Leon Talley called him an "unsung genius." Walker was a fashion consultant for Marc Jacobs, Kim Jones, and Louis Vuitton. Along with his eponymous fashion line, he has also designed for WilliWear.

== Life and career ==
Born in London, Walker and his family moved to Ditmas Park, Brooklyn when he was 10 years old. As a child, he poured through all his mother's fashion magazine subscriptions such as W, Vogue France, British Vogue, and Vogue Italia, and he began sketching clothes in them. His Jamaican mother was a hairdresser and she supported his aspirations. He experimented with construction such as dresses made of two T-shirts, and his mother sold his first designs in her hair salon.

Walker was part of the downtown New York club scene in the 1980s. At 15, Walker had his first fashion show at a nightclub called Oasis in Brooklyn in 1980. In the next few years, he has fashion shows at Danceteria and the Roxy in New York City. Eventually, he caught the eye of Patricia Field who sold his creations at her boutique on 8th Street in Greenwich Village.

Walker attended Brooklyn Technical High School in Fort Greene, Brooklyn. "I was studying architectural design and rendering, pattern-making for the foundry–meaning how to make and design tools like hammers and wrenches–and learning about perspective drawing and things like that," he said. While he was a senior in high school in 1983, Walker began to gain recognition for his "pantskirt," a unisex garment that combined slacks and a belted over-skirt that wrapped around the front. Walker called it his "African diplomat son's look" because it was "very rich and regal-looking."

In 1986, Walker produced a fashion show at the Palladium nightclub. Most of the models for the show were Walker's friends and relatives, including his mother.

In 1989, Laurie Mallet, president of WilliWear, hired Walker to design the women's collection. In April 1990, Walker's Fall 1990 collection for WilliWear was poorly received by the fashion press. This coupled with financial problems led the company to file Chapter 11 bankruptcy in 1990.

Walker moved to Paris with the sponsorship of Bjorn Amelan former partner of designer Patrick Kelly. Amelan was a financial back for Walker's first collection in Paris, which debuted in March 1991. Walker had five collections up until March 1995.

In 2000, after he’d won the ANDAM Fashion Award, the French equivalent of the CFDA Award, Walker closed his company and returned to New York. Back in Brooklyn, Walker published two issues of a high-concept art and fashion magazine called Tiwimuta.

After consulting for Louis Vuitton, Marc Jacobs, and Kim Jones, Jones introduced Walker to Adrian Joffe and Rei Kawakubo of Comme des Garçons. This led to Walker designing a women's Ready-to-Wear collection under the name And Re Walker for Dover Street Market.

In 2017, Walker presented his Spring 2019 Ready-to-Wear collection at the Musée des Art Décoratifs in Paris. The collection was based on the clothing he designed between 1982 and 1986.

In 2019, Walker designed a collection of upcycled furs for Yves Salomon. In 2021, Walker collaborated with Virgil Abloh's label Off-White. In 2023, he collaborated with Pendleton to create a limited-edition blanket.

== Personal life ==
Walker is Catholic.
