= Marvel Universe Live! =

Play

- Poster for the 2014 UK tour.
- Company: Feld Entertainment
- Genre: Superhero
- Show type: Touring arena
- Date of premiere: July 10, 2014
- Location: Mobile

Creative team
- Primary Marvel character creators: Stan Lee & Jack Kirby
- Producer: Juliette Feld

Other information
- Production company: Feld Entertainment
- Official website

Marvel Universe Live!, stylized as Marvel Universe LIVE!, is a touring live action arena show featuring Marvel Comics characters by Feld Entertainment. So far there have been two shows under the banner, the original and "Age of Heroes".

Marvel's previous licensed theatrical show, Spider-Man: Turn Off the Dark, a Broadway musical, was plagued by several injuries. Marvel's licenses currently do not restrict the company's characters from appearing in a theatrical presentation such as an arena show.

== History ==
In March 2013, Feld Entertainment agreed with Marvel Entertainment to produce a Marvel Character-based live arena show. For nearly two years, development and engineering had been underway for the show. In September 2013, regional casting calls began in Los Angeles with another set held in Las Vegas, New York, and in Orlando in October. In October 2013, at New York Comic Con, Marvel and Feld revealed that the arena show would be Marvel Universe LIVE!. In February 2014, the performers were cast and rehearsals began at Feld's facility in Ellenton. The cast was selected from a pool of Martial artists, aerial performers, X Games competitors, and stunt people.

On July 10, 2014, Marvel Universe Live! premiered at the Tampa Bay Times Forum with showing there until July 13. The show has an initial 85-city national tour. The show's world premiere followed on August 13 at New York City's Barclays Center. After Tampa, Florida, and New York City, the show stayed on the east coast which includes stops at Washington D.C., Philadelphia, Nashville, Miami, and Atlanta.

A new Marvel Universe Live! show, "Age of Heroes", was announced by Feld in May 2017. The tour had a soft launch in New Orleans from June 23–25 before heading out West for the summer. Age of Heroes debuted at the Staples Center in Los Angeles on July 7, 2017. Age of Heroes went to the Midwest in the fall follow by Canada and circling the USA until early 2019, when the show goes overseas.

== Original show ==
Marvel Universe Live!
- Poster for the 2014 UK tour.
- Company: Feld Entertainment
- Date of premiere: July 10, 2014

Creative team
- Director: Shanda Sawyer
- Writers: Adam Wilson; Melanie Wilson LaBracio
- Stunt coordinator: Andy Armstrong
- Casting director: Jessica Ferris
- Costume designer: Cynthia Nordstrom
- Scenic designer: Joe Stewart
- Lighting designer: Norm Schwab
- Composer: Michael Picton

Other information
- Length: 90 minutes

Thor shatters the Cosmic Cube to prevent it from being used for evil. Loki moves to reform the cube in order to destroy the Earth. So, a worldwide race for the fragments is on. The Avengers, Spider-Man, and the X-Men work to stop Loki and the other involved super villains (Red Skull, Madame Hydra, Electro, Green Goblin, and Doctor Octopus) to save the Earth.

== Characters ==
Superheroes	Live	Age of Heroes
Avengers	Live	Age of Heroes
Captain America	Yes	Yes
Iron Man	Yes	Yes
Thor	Yes	Yes
Hulk	Yes	Yes
Black Widow	Yes	Yes
Hawkeye	Yes	
S.H.I.E.L.D.	Live	Age of Heroes
Nick Fury	Yes	
Maria Hill	Yes	
S.H.I.E.L.D. agents	Yes	Yes
X-Men	Live	Age of Heroes
Wolverine	Yes	
Storm	Yes	
Cyclops	Yes	
Guardians of the Galaxy	Live	Age of Heroes
Star-Lord		Yes
Gamora		Yes
Drax the Destroyer		Yes
Rocket Raccoon		Yes
Groot		Yes
Other heroes	Live	Age of Heroes
Pepper Potts	Yes	
Spider-Man	Yes	Yes
Captain Marvel	Yes	
Falcon	Yes	
Doctor Strange		Yes
Wasp		Yes
Black Panther		Yes
Iron Fist		Yes
Supervillains	Live	Age of Heroes
A.I.M.	Live	Age of Heroes
Aldrich Killian	Yes	
A.I.M. agents	Yes	
Extremis agents	Yes	
Sinister Six	Live	Age of Heroes
Green Goblin	Yes	Yes
Doctor Octopus	Yes	
Rhino	Yes	Yes
Black Cat	Yes	Yes
Electro	Yes	Yes
Lizard	Yes	Yes
Hydra	Live	Age of Heroes
Red Skull	Yes	
Viper	Yes	
Hydra agents	Yes	
Other villains	Live	Age of Heroes
Yondu		Yes
Ravagers		Yes
Nebula		Yes
Loki	Yes	Yes
Chitauri	Yes	Yes

== Age of Heroes ==
Marvel Universe Live: Age of Heroes
- Date of premiere: July 17, 2017

Creative team
- Director: James Hadley
- Writer: David Love
- Flying director: Mark Dirkse
- Action director: Eric Miranda
- Scenic designer: Josh Zangen
- Costume designer: Mark Koss
- Lighting designer: Sam Doty
- Composer: Michael Picton

Other information
- Length: 90 minutes

The Guardians of the Galaxy and the Avengers team up to help Doctor Strange retrieve the Wand of Watoomb from Yondu. Loki has hired Nebula to get the Wand for him. The Guardians of the Galaxy are also after Nebula. The two teams meet in Asgard before uniting and travel to stop Loki and Nebula from ending the world with the wand.

== See also ==
- Iron Man Experience
- Marvel Experience
- Marvel Super Heroes 4D
- Spider-Man Live!
- Spider-Man: Turn Off the Dark
