= Temple Owls =

Intercollegiate sports teams of Temple University

- University: Temple University
- Nickname: The Owls
- NCAA: Division I (FBS)
- Conference: The American (primary); Big East (field hockey); EAGL (women's gymnastics); Independent (men's crew, women's fencing)
- Athletic director: Arthur Johnson
- Location: Philadelphia, Pennsylvania
- Varsity teams: 19
- Football stadium: Lincoln Financial Field
- Basketball arena: Liacouras Center
- Soccer stadium: Temple Sports Complex
- Colors: Cherry and white
- Mascot: Hooter T. Owl, Stella (Live Mascot)
- Fight song: Fight! Temple Fight!
- Website: owlsports.com
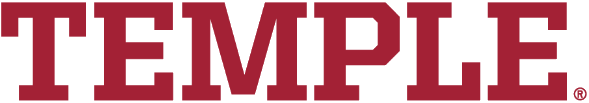

The Temple Owls are the athletic teams that represent Temple University in Philadelphia, Pennsylvania. The current athletic director is Arthur Johnson.

The owl has been the symbol and mascot for Temple University since its founding in the 1880s. Temple was the first school in the United States to adopt the owl as its symbol or mascot. The owl, a nocturnal hunter, was initially adopted as a symbol because Temple University began as a night school for young people of limited means. Russell Conwell, Temple's founder, encouraged these students with the remark: "The owl of the night makes the eagle of the day."

== Affiliation ==
The Owls are primarily members of the American Conference (The American). Since their football team participates in the NCAA's Division I Football Bowl Subdivision. The football program was a member of the Big East Conference until its expulsion after the 2004 season due to a variety of program shortcomings. Temple played a limited MAC schedule in 2005 and 2006 before becoming an affiliated football-only member and playing a full 8-game league schedule in 2007. The school's men's basketball team is part of the Big Five, the traditional designation for the rivalries between the Owls and their Philadelphia rivals: Penn, Saint Joseph's, Villanova, and La Salle.

The landscape of Temple sports changed in the early 2010s, thanks to a major realignment of Division I conferences. Temple football returned to the Big East in 2012, and then became a full member of the renamed American Conference in July 2013, after being a full member (non-football) of the A-10 since the early '80s. The Owls are an affiliate member of The Big East for Field Hockey and the East Atlantic Gymnastics League for gymnastics.

As of the 2023 conference realignment, Temple and Wichita State are the only two schools in the American to have never been members of Conference USA. Additionally, Temple is the only member of the AAC remaining from the northeast and the only member outside its geographical footprint after UConn's return to the Big East Conference and Cincinnati's departure to the Big 12 Conference.

== Conference affiliations ==
=== NCAA ===
American logo in Temple's colors

- East Coast Conference (1958–1982)
- Atlantic 10 Conference (1982–2013)
- American Conference (2013–present)

== Achievements ==
Temple University was among the first institutions in the United States to sponsor extracurricular athletic activities for its students. Both the football and basketball programs were inaugurated in 1894 under the direction of Coach Charles M. Williams.

== Championships ==
=== NCAA team championships ===
Temple has won three team national championships.

- Men's (1)
  - Gymnastics (1): 1949
- Women's (2)
  - Lacrosse (2): 1984, 1988
- see also:
  - American Athletic Conference NCAA team championships
  - List of NCAA schools with the most NCAA Division I championships

=== Other national team championships ===
- Men's (2)
  - Soccer (2): 1951, 1953
- Women's (1)
  - AIAW Lacrosse (1): 1982

== Olympic competitors ==
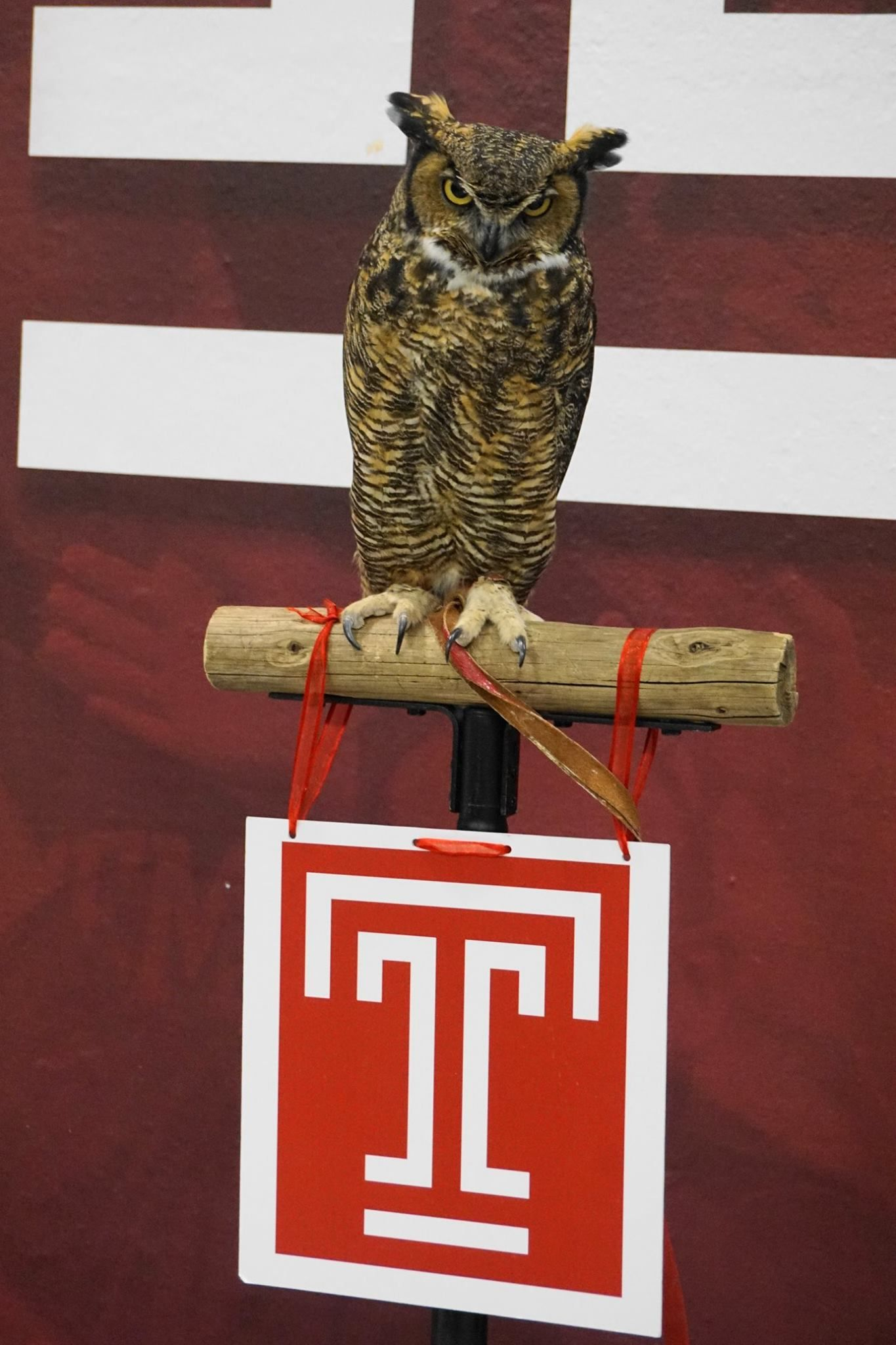
Stella, the Temple mascot

• 1904 St. Louis Olympics: a Philadelphia-based team (Turngemeinde gymnastics club) captured the first-ever gold medal in team competition for the United States.
• 1932 Los Angeles Olympics: Bill Herrmann (Philadelphia), wins bronze medal for tumbling.
• 1936 Berlin Olympics: Chet Phillips was a member of the men's gymnastics team.
• 1948 London Olympics: Temple University gymnasts Marian Barone and Clara Schroth-Lomady help the United States win its first medal for women in team competition with the bronze. Schroth is also noted for holding two U.S. national gymnastics records – the most titles with 39 and the most consecutive championships with 11 straight on the balance beam between 1941 and 1952.
• 1952 Helsinki Olympics: Bob Stout (Philadelphia, Pa.) becomes the first gymnast ever to complete a back somersault with full twist when he landed the move during the floor exercises.
• 1984 Los Angeles Olympics: Temple men's assistant rowing coach, Mike Teti (Upper Darby Pa.), named Olympic alternate and was on the cover of Sports Illustrated during the athletes parade in the Opening Ceremony.
• 1988 Seoul Korea: Men's rowing assistant Mike Teti was a member of the bronze winning U.S. Men's Eight rowing team.
• 1992 Barcelona Olympics: Mike Moore (Philadelphia, Pa.) was the coxswain for the U.S. rowing team's Men's Eight. Temple men's gymnastics coach Fred Turoff is an assistant coach on the U.S. Olympic Team.
• 1996 Atlanta Olympics: Scott Brodie (St. Catharines, Canada) was a member of the Canadian Men's Eight that placed fourth.
• 2000 Sydney Olympics: Igor Francetic (Zagreb, Croatia) was a member of the bronze medal-winning Croatian Eight rowing team; Long time Temple men's rowing coach, Dr. Gavin White (Elkins Park, Pa.), named U.S. Olympic Assistant Coach.
• 2004 Athens Olympics: Jason Read (Ringoes, N.J.) was a member of the U.S. Men's Eight that won gold and set a world record in rowing; Temple women's basketball coach, Dawn Staley, was the United States team captain and flag bearer and a member of the women's basketball team that won gold; Miles Avery (Philadelphia native and Temple graduate) is an assistant coach on the Olympic Team and personal coach of All-Around Champion Paul Hamm. Juan Ignacio Sanchez(Bahia Blanca, Argentina) Temple's graduate was a member of the Argentina's Basketball national team that won the gold medal.
• 2008 Beijing: Marcus McElhenney (Havertown, Pa.) coxed the U.S. Men's Eight to a bronze medal in rowing and Jason Read was also a member of the team and contributed to the Wall Street Journal's Beijing coverage of the Games.

== Teams ==
Temple sponsors 18 varsity teams. Seven of these are men's sports and eleven are women's sports.

Men's sports	Women's sports
Basketball	Basketball
Crew	Cross country
Cross country	Fencing
Football	Field hockey
Golf	Gymnastics
Soccer	Lacrosse
Tennis	Rowing
	Soccer
	Tennis
	Track and field^{†}
	Volleyball
† – Track and field includes both indoor and outdoor.

=== Men's basketball ===
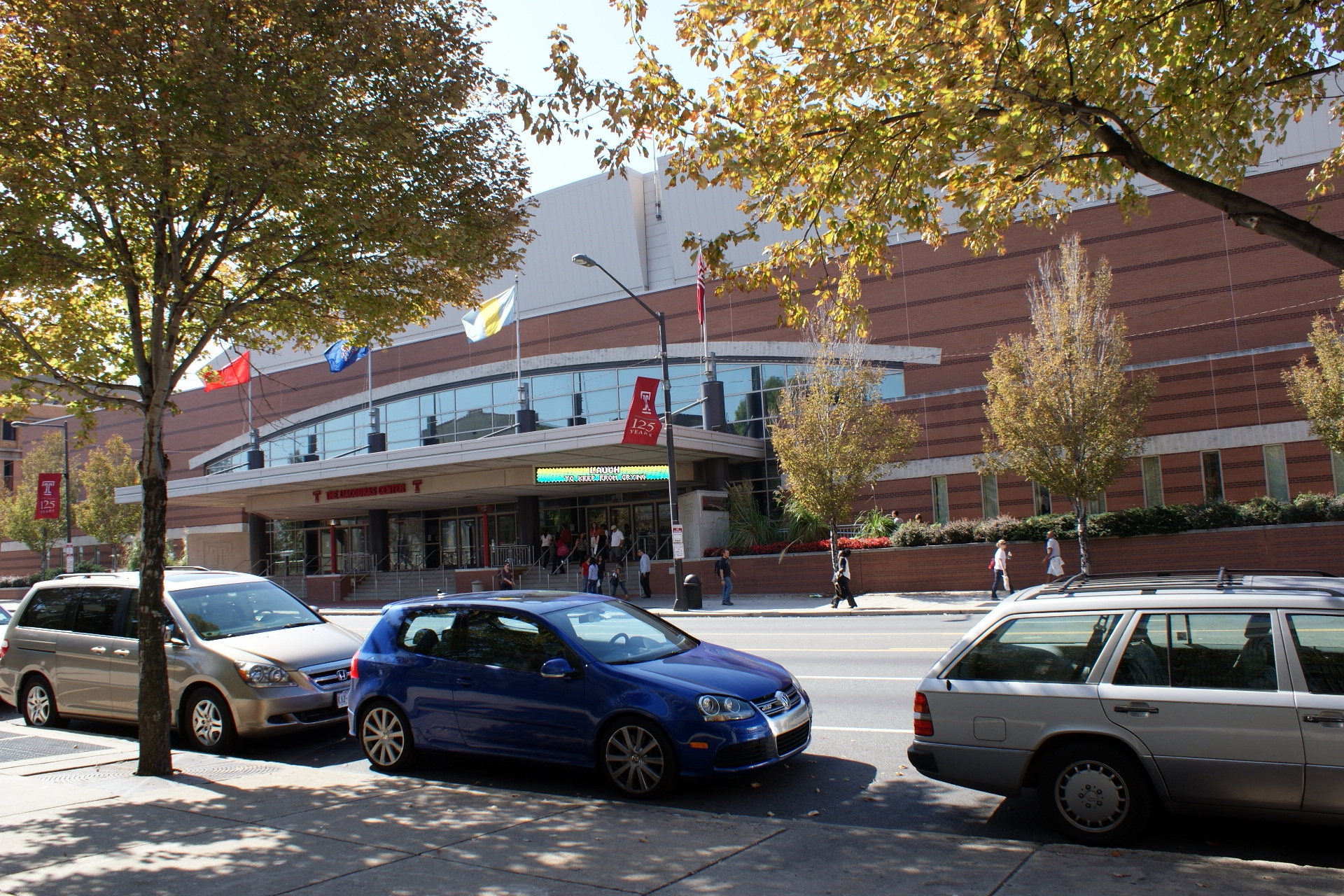
Liacouras Center, home of Temple Owls basketball and volleyball teams since 1997

In 1938, the Owls, who finished with a 23–2 record, won the inaugural National Invitation Tournament by routing Colorado, 60–36, in the championship final. Because the NCAA tournament was not held until the following year, Temple's NIT championship earned the Owls national title recognition. The team was also retroactively named the national champion by the Helms Athletic Foundation and the Premo-Porretta Power Poll.

During the 1950s, the Temple basketball team made two NCAA Final Four appearances (1956, 1958) under Head Coach Harry Litwack. Litwack would be inducted into the Naismith Memorial Basketball Hall of Fame after concluding a 21-year coaching career that included 373 wins. Head Coach John Chaney, also a Hall of Famer, won a total of 724 career games and took Temple to the NCAA tournament 17 times. His 1987–88 Owls team entered the NCAA tournament ranked No. 1 in the country, and he has reached the Elite Eight on five occasions. He was consensus national coach of the year in 1988. Former NBA players Eddie Jones of the Miami Heat, Aaron McKie of the Los Angeles Lakers, Rick Brunson of the New York Knicks, and Mardy Collins, formerly of the Los Angeles Clippers, are also part of Temple's basketball heritage.

On March 13, 2006, Hall of Fame head coach John Chaney retired.

On April 10, 2006, University of Pennsylvania head coach and La Salle University alumnus Fran Dunphy was named Temple's new men's head basketball coach. Dunphy had coached the Quakers for 17 straight seasons prior to the move. Dunphy and his Owls won the Atlantic-10 tournament in 2008 beating St. Joseph's University. The Owls were rewarded with a 12 seed in the NCAA tournament and paired against 5th-seeded Michigan State, losing that game 72–61. In 2009, the Owls won their second consecutive Atlantic-10 tournament against Duquesne, for their conference leading 13th title.

After Dunphy's (temporary) retirement in 2019, alumnus Aaron McKie was named the program's head coach. The move was well received at the time due to his deep connection with Philadelphia basketball. McKie was 1993 A-10 Player of the Year with Temple, and won the 2001–02 NBA Sixth Man of the Year Award with the Philadelphia 76ers helping them reach the NBA Finals. McKie had been part of the Sixers' coaching staff prior to being named head coach of the Owls. McKie's tenure saw many highs, but just as many lows. A tumultuous 2022–23 season, where the team went on record saying they believed they could qualify for the NCAA tournament, saw the Owls defeating #16 Villanova at home and #1 Houston on the road, but suffering home losses to Wagner College and University of Maryland-Eastern Shore. Ultimately, Temple couldn't live up to their own hype; suffering a 30-point defeat to Cincinnati in the AAC Tournament quarterfinals. The magnitude of the loss, coupled with the failure to reach the NCAA tournament in his five years and the exit of five of the team's top players via the transfer portal doomed McKie's tenure. McKie stepped down as head coach after the 22–23 season, though he remains with Temple as a Special Advisor to the Athletic Department.

Former Miami and Penn State assistant Adam Fisher (basketball) was named McKie's successor on March 29, 2023. Fisher's first season saw the Owls win 16 games, tied for the most by a first-year head coach in program history. Temple's wins over Big 5 rivals Drexel on November 14 and La Salle on Nov. 29 (in triple overtime) put the Owls in the championship game of the inaugural Big 5 Classic, but they fell to St. Joe's. The Owls struggled in conference play with a 5–13 regular season record in the AAC. But Temple nearly stunned the college basketball world by making their way to the AAC Tournament finals, winning four games in four days; including a semifinal win over Florida Atlantic University, who reached the Final Four the previous season. The Owls' momentum ran out however, and they suffered a 16-point loss to the University of Alabama at Birmingham.

Entering the 2024–25 season, Temple men's basketball program ranked tied for sixth in NCAA All-Time wins with 1,993.

=== Football ===
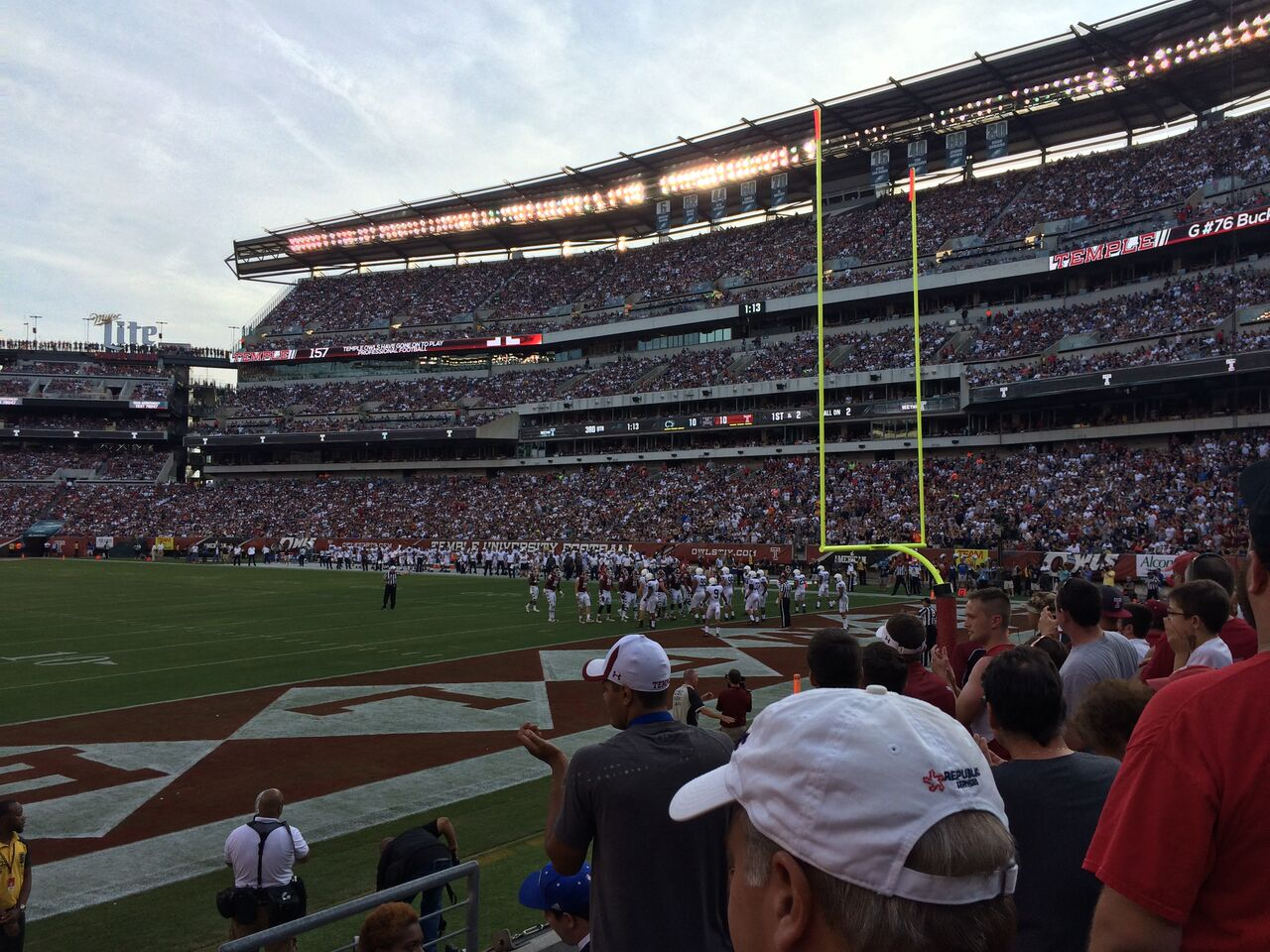
Temple beats Penn State for first time since 1941

The Owls football team participates in the NCAA's Football Bowl Subdivision, but because the A-10 supported football only at the Football Championship Subdivision level (1997–2006), they maintained separate league affiliation for football. They were a member of the Big East Conference until their expulsion after the 2004 season due to a variety of program shortcomings; they played a limited Mid-American Conference schedule in 2005 and 2006 before becoming a completely affiliated football-only member and playing a full 8-game MAC league schedule in 2007. In December 2005, Al Golden, the defensive coordinator for the University of Virginia, was named head coach, replaced Bobby Wallace. He would accumulate a 27–34 record before moving to the Miami (FL). With the improvement to Temple's football program, the school was invited to rejoin the Big East Conference as an associate member for football for 2012 and as a full member for all sports in 2013. By the time Temple returned to full membership, the Big East had split along football lines into a new, non-football Big East Conference and the football-sponsoring American Athletic Conference, with Temple joining The American. On December 23, 2010, Steve Addazio, then offensive coordinator at the University of Florida, was named head coach to continue and build upon the foundation Golden had left.

2015 was a breakout year for the program. The Owls won 10 out of 12 regular season games, including victories over Penn State, Cincinnati and a 4-point loss in the waning minutes to Notre Dame, with an AAC Championship game-clinching victory over bowl-bound UConn in the final game of the season. For the first time in generations, the Temple Owls were ranked in the AP, Coaches and College Football Playoff polls for half the season.

=== Baseball ===
Temple's baseball program was in existence from 1927 to 2014, and played in two College World Series. Its winningest coach, James "Skip" Wilson, guided the Owls to 901 career wins. The team played in the NCAA Tournament a total of 14 times, and advanced to the NCAA College World Series in 1972 and 1977. The Owls were three-time A-10 Champions (1983, 1984, 2001) since joining the league in 1983.

Temple played its home games at Skip Wilson Field in Ambler, a Philadelphia suburb, from 2004 to 2014. After the 2014 season, the program was cut to comply with Title IX.

=== Rugby ===
Temple plays every year at the Collegiate Rugby Championship (CRC). The CRC is the highest profile college rugby tournament in the country, and is played every year at PPL Park in Philadelphia, and is broadcast live on NBC. Temple is one of the local favorites at the CRC, and is considered to have "the best fans, as they put in time and effort and noise to cheer for their teams." One opposing coach stated that the Temple fans at PPL Park were "the greatest fan advantage I've ever seen."

Temple Rugby has been one of the most successful sports at Temple University since its inception in 1980. Temple has won the Mayor's Cup and Liberty Cup multiple times. Temple has qualified for the EPRU championships three years in a row, and in 2003 won the Division II EPRU championships. Temple played in the Division II title game in 2010, but lost to Claremont 25–19. Temple's success resulted in its promotion in 2010 to the Division I level. Temple now plays in the Keystone Conference against local rivals such as St. Joseph's University. In their first season in Division 1, Temple posted a 12–2 record, and advanced to the 2011 Division I National Collegiate Rugby Championship playoffs, where they reached the round of 16 before losing to top seeded Bowling Green. Temple rugby is funded by the university, alumni, and student fundraising.

=== Men's soccer ===
The soccer program was established in 1926, producing five Olympians en route to surpassing the 500-win milestone in the fall of 1996. The team is currently coached by Bryan Green, a former associate head coach at University of Louisville, who succeeded Brian Rowland in December 2022.

Previous head coach David MacWilliams guided the Owls to three straight A-10 Tournament appearances in 2010, 2011 and 2012. All-time, the program has made six NCAA Tournament appearances (1966, 1967, 1973, 1976, 1978, 1985) and won first-round games in three of those appearances (1966, 1976, 1978). The Owls won the Soccer Bowl in 1951 and went undefeated in 1953 to win an Intercollegiate Soccer Football Association National Championship.

== Other men's sports ==
=== Cross Country and Track & Field ===
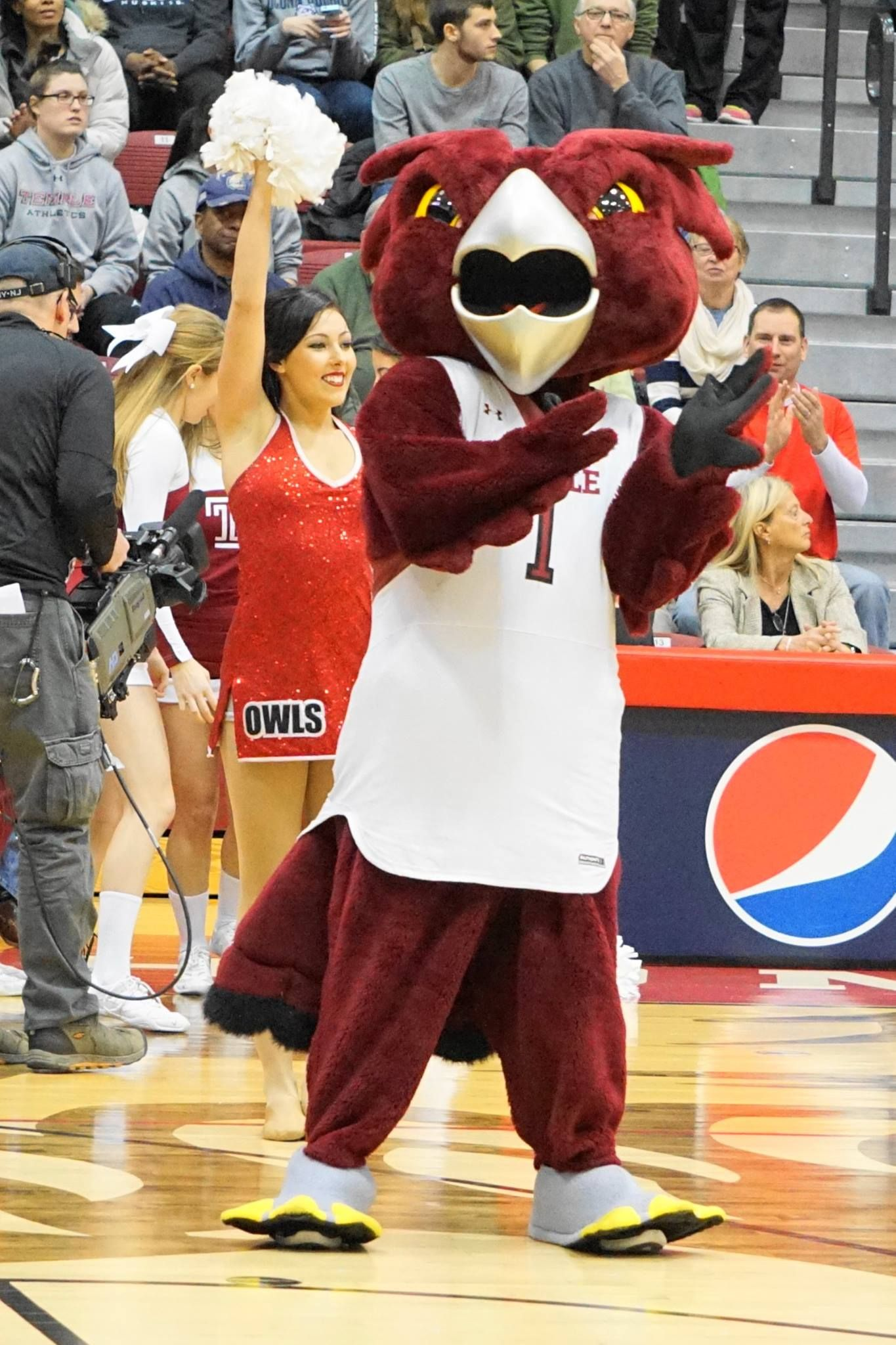
Hooter, the Temple mascot

Men's and women's cross country and track & field teams are coached by Elvis Forde, who entered his inaugural season in 2014–15. In 2012, Travis Mahoney became the first-ever Temple cross country runner to score points at the NCAA Championships, placing fifth and earning his second All-American honor in the sport (2nd team in 2011, 1st team in 2012). Earlier in 2012, Mahoney was Temple's first-ever First Team All-American for track & field when he placed fifth in the 3000-meter steeplechase at the NCAA Championships.

One of the program's most notable athletes, Eulace Peacock remains a giant in the history of the sport. In the mid-1930s, Peacock brought national attention to himself and the Temple program with a string of sprinting victories over famed Ohio State and Olympic Games star Jesse Owens.

=== Crew ===
Temple's men's crew team is coached by Alumnus Brian Perkins. Since taking over in 2016, Perkins has taken the Owls to their first Henley Royal Regatta since 1994 after sweeping the Dad Vail Regatta in record fashion. Prior to being named head coach, Perkins spent seven seasons as the assistant coach and top recruiter.

Prior to Perkins, Dr. Gavin R. White, coached Temple for 37 seasons before retiring at the end of the 2015–16 season. Under White's guidance, the Owls earned international distinction with seven invitations to Great Britain's premiere regatta, the renowned Henley Royal Regatta (1983–86, 1989, 1990, 1994). In Temple's seven appearances, White has led the Owls to the Grand Finale once (1984) and into the quarterfinals four times (1985, 1990, 1993, 1994).

=== Golf ===
The Temple golf program, inaugurated in 1931, has participated in 20 NCAA championship tournaments, produced 22 All-American citations and won 15 conference championships. Golf team is coached by Brian Quinn, entering his 14th season in 2021–22. The program has made 14 NCAA Tournament appearances, most recently in 1988, and won the Atlantic 10 Championship six times (1982, 1984, 1985, 1992, 1993, 1995).

=== Gymnastics ===
Under Fred Turoff, the men's gymnastics team has won 18 ECAC/EIGL championships, and produced five individual NCAA national champions. Recently Darin Gerlach won an individual event national championship in 1998. As of 2013, Temple's men's gymnastics team was coached by Fred Turoff, entering his 38th season in 2013–14 with an impressive career record of 432–184. The program won the NCAA Championship in 1948–49, and won seven Eastern College Athletic Conference (ECAC) Championships including back-to-back titles in 2012 and 2013. Fifteen members of the team have won individual NCAA titles.

Men's gymnastics was cut from NCAA Division I as of the 2013–2014 school year.

=== Tennis ===
Temple's tennis team is coached by Steve Mauro, entering his 17th season as men's coach and who also coaches the women's tennis team. The men's program won the Atlantic 10 Championship in 1985.

== Women's sports ==
As early as 1923, the university's women began participating on club sport teams. In fact, that year, Coach Blanche Voorhees guided an Owl basketball team to a perfect 12–0 record and also started a field hockey program. Additional sports for women followed: swimming in 1926, tennis in 1939, fencing in 1946, softball in 1949, lacrosse in 1957, and finally volleyball, track and field in 1975. The modern era took root in 1974, when Temple named physical education instructor Veronica "Ronnie" Maurek to the dual role of head basketball and softball coach. When Maurek chose to coach only softball three years later, the university went outside the physical education department for the first time to hire its first modern-day full-time women's basketball coach, Andy McGovern.

=== Basketball ===
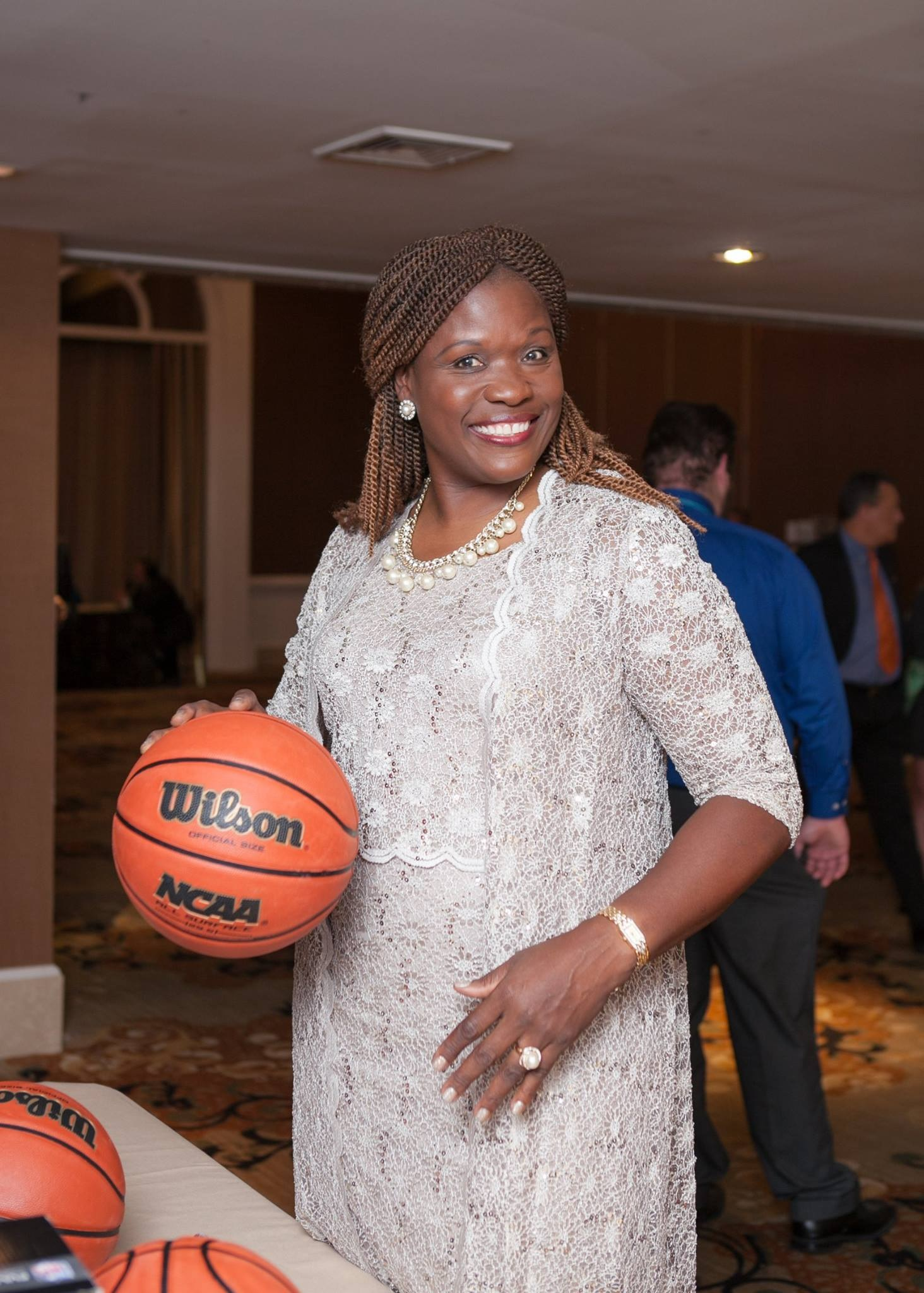
Marilyn Stephens was named to the Kodak All-America team in the 1983–84 season

Andy McGovern, who was Temple's first full-time women's basketball coach, produced the Owls' first winning season of the modern era with a 14–10 mark in the 1979–80 season. Prior to the 1980–81 season, Temple named Linda MacDonald as its second full-time head coach and began the process of national recruiting and scheduling. By the 1988–89 season, MacDonald had produced the Owls' first team to qualify for the NCAA Tournament.

From 1999 to 2008, the Temple Owls women's basketball team was guided by head coach and three-time Olympic Gold Medalist, Dawn Staley. Under Staley's leadership, Temple earned six NCAA Appearances (2002, 2004, 2005, 2006, 2007, and 2008).

Staley was named the head coach for the University of South Carolina on May 7, 2008. She was succeeded by Tonya Cardoza, a former assistant coach from the University of Connecticut. As an assistant coach at UConn, Cardoza helped lead the Huskies to five National Championships (1995, 2000, 2002, 2003, 2004). Cardoza was introduced as the head coach for the Temple Owls on July 1, 2008.

In 2005, by winning 25 straight games, a #15 national ranking and a trip to the NCAA second round for just the second time in school history, Temple Women's Basketball also upholds the reputation of Temple athletics. Women's Basketball coach Dawn Staley was the 2004 Atlantic 10 Coach of the Year, has won 74 games in her first four seasons, captured Temple's only two conference championships and earned three postseason bids. In the summer of 2004 she captured her third Olympic Gold Medal, playing for Team USA in the 2004 Games in Athens, Greece and was selected as the United States flag bearer for the opening ceremonies.

Entering the 2011–12 season, Temple had played in the previous nine NCAA tournaments. The Owls' streak ended in 2012 when they played instead in the Women's National Invitation Tournament (WNIT). They advanced to the WNIT Third round. Heading into the 2021–22 season, Tonya Cardoza's overall record at Temple is 238–173. She is the all-time winningest coach at Temple

Following the 2021–22 season. Cardoza was fired after not making a postseason in four straight seasons. She was replaced by former Towson head coach Diane Richardson.

=== Cross Country and Track & Field ===
Temple's men's and women's cross country and track & field teams are coached by Elvis Forde, entering his 8th season in 2021–22.

=== Fencing ===
Temple's fencing team operates under head coach Nikki Franke. Between 1983 and 1995, Owl fencers competed in the NCAA championships every year and never finished lower than fifth. Coach Nikki Franke entered her 44th season in 2015–16 with an impressive 723–207–1 career record. Franke led the Owls to 40 postseason appearances during her tenure. Temple's Foil team won the NCAA National Championship in the 1991–92 season and claimed a total of 12 top-six finishes from 1983 through 1994. Franke has been honored as national Coach of the Year on four occasions.» In the 2016 – 2017 season, Temple finished 34–9 overall in dual meets, setting a program record for wins in a season and surpassing the previous record by six (28 wins in 2013–14).

Dr. Franke retired after the 2021–22 season. On August 23, 2002, Jennie Salmon, former men's and women's head coach at Brandeis University and a member of Temple's 1991–92 national championship foil team, was announced as Franke's successor.

=== Field Hockey ===
Temple field hockey teams have finished among the NCAA's top 20 no less than 13 times in the last 15 seasons, while producing 24 All-Americans. Jane Catanzaro, a four-time All-American between 1987 and 1990, won the prestigious Honda Award in the 1990–91 academic year, for outstanding achievement and excellence in intercollegiate athletics. Amanda Janney led the field hockey team for 10 years until she resigned in 2015. The program advanced to the Atlantic 10 Tournament for 10 straight seasons from 2003 to 2012. The Owls have made three NCAA Tournament appearances (1990, 1991, 1992) and won the A-10 Championship in 1991. The current coach is Michelle Vittese, leading the field hockey team since 2021.

=== Gymnastics ===
The gymnastics program started in 1975. The current gymnastics team is coached by current assistant coach Rachel Innis (2019–Present) and prior head coach was Umme Salim-Beasley, hired as Temple's head women's gymnastics coach in late April, 2015; Salim-Beasley had spent a prior four seasons as an assistant coach at Rutgers University, and was named the East Atlantic Gymnastics League (EAGL) Assistant Coach of the Year in 2014. Since 2009, the Owls have placed third in the ECAC three times (2009, 2010, 2012), and fourth two times (2011, 2013). From 2019 to 2021 the gymnastics program won three straight conference titles. The Owls claimed the ECAC title in 2019 and 2020, and won the first ever EAGL title in 2021. Despite earning an automatic bid by winning the EAGL, Temple did not compete in the NCAA tournament due to COVID-19 protocols.

=== Lacrosse ===
Under the direction of Tina Sloan Green, and beginning in 1975, the Temple lacrosse program captured three national championships and has had individuals earn 67 All-American certificates. The Owls won three national titles under Green. Temple is the sixth winningest program in NCAA history.

The tradition of excellence was carried on by head coach Kim Ciarrocca, who was a member of the Owls' 1988 national championship club and guided her 1997 team into the NCAA Final Four. Temple's women's lacrosse is currently coached by Bonnie Rosen, leading the team since 2007. Rosen is a 2010 US Lacrosse Hall of Fame inductee. The program won the NCAA National Championship in both 1984 and 1988, and has made 18 all-time appearances in the NCAA Tournament. The Owls won five A-10 Championships during their 15 years in the league, most recently in 2008. In the 2021, Temple made their first NCAA Tournament appearance in 13 years. Rosen achieved her 200th win as a head coach in 2022.

=== Rowing ===
Rowing team is coached by Rebecca Smith Grzybowski, entering her second season as head coach in 2013–14. The program's women's varsity 8 earned gold medals at the 1994 and 1996 Dad Vail Regattas, and the varsity 8 earned a silver medal at the 2006 Atlantic 10 Championships.

=== Soccer ===
Women's soccer team played its first season in 1981. The Owls advanced to the Atlantic 10 Tournament three times (1993, 1994 and 1995).

=== Softball ===
Temple's softball team was coached by Joe DiPietro, who entered his sixth season in 2013–14. DiPietro coached the Owls to a school-record 32 wins and school-record 90 Home Runs in the 2013 season. The program made one appearance in the NCAA Tournament in 2004 after winning the Atlantic 10 Championship. In 2014, Temple University eliminated the program in a budget-cutting move.

=== Tennis ===
Temple's women's tennis team is coached by Steve Mauro, entering his sixth season as women's coach in 2015–16. The women's program won four Atlantic 10 Championships (1994, 1995, 2003, 2008).

=== Volleyball ===
The Temple's volleyball team was led by one of the "architects of the game," Bob Bertucci for 16 years until his retirement in 2010. Temple's volleyball team is currently coached by Linda Hampton-Keith, taking over in December 2021. The program has made four NCAA Tournament appearances (1987, 1988, 1989, 2002), and advanced to the NCAA Sweet Sixteen in 2002. The Owls were also A-10 Champions in each of those four seasons.

== Program cuts ==
In 2013, Temple announced the school would eliminate the following seven athletic teams: Softball, baseball, women's rowing, men's rowing (a non-NCAA sport), men's gymnastics, and both men's indoor and outdoor track and field. The school said they no longer chose to field 24 teams and cited Title IX, facility needs, and student welfare. Several months after that announcement, the city of Philadelphia agreed to pay for the renovation of Temple's former boathouse, leading Temple to immediately reinstate rowing as a varsity sport for both sexes.

== See also ==
- Sports in Philadelphia
- Lacrosse in Pennsylvania
