= Fred Turoff =

American gymnast and gymnastics coach

- Full name: Fred Turoff
- Born: Philadelphia, PA, U.S.

Gymnastics career
- Country represented: United States
- College team: Temple Owls

Fred Turoff is an American gymnastics coach and former gymnast. He competed collegiately as a member of the Temple University men's gymnastics team from 1966 to 1969. Turoff was men's gymnastics head coach at Temple for 38 years from 1976 until 2014, when the Temple men's gymnastics team was cut from the NCAA Division I level. He currently serves as an assistant coach for the Temple men's gymnastics club team under head coach Jesse Kitzen-Abelson.

== Early life ==
Turoff is a native of Philadelphia, Pennsylvania and after moving to Connecticut he was a two-time state high school all-around champion while competing at Rippowam High School in Stamford, Connecticut. In college, Turoff competed in gymnastics at Temple University from 1966 to 1969.

== Coaching career ==
Turoff was men's gymnastics head coach at Temple from 1976 until 2014, when the Temple men's gymnastics team was cut from the NCAA Division I level.

He has represented the United States as a gymnastics head coach at several competitions, including as an assistant coach at the 1991 World University Games, 1991 Pan American Games, and 1992 Summer Olympics

== Halls of Fame ==
Turoff is a member of the Temple Athletic Hall of Fame, inducted in 1984. He was inducted in 2009 to the USA Gymnastics Hall of Fame. He is a member of the Philadelphia Jewish Sports Hall of Fame.
