= East Atlantic Gymnastics League =

US collegiate women's sports league

- Association: NCAA
- Founded: 1995
- Sports fielded: Women's gymnastics
- Division: Division I
- No. of teams: 5
- Region: East Coast
- Official website: eaglsid.wixsite.com/eaglgymnastics

The East Atlantic Gymnastics League (EAGL) is a collegiate women's gymnastics conference competing at the NCAA Division I level. The league comprises five universities.

== Members ==
=== Current members ===
Institution	City	State	Nickname	Joined	Primary conference	Conference championships
George Washington University	Washington	District of Columbia	Revolutionaries	2004	Atlantic 10 Conference	3
University of New Hampshire	Durham	New Hampshire	Wildcats	1995	America East Conference	3
Towson University	Towson	Maryland	Tigers	1995 (Note: Towson left the EAGL in 2005 and rejoined in 2013.)	Coastal Athletic Association	1
Long Island University	Brookville	New York	Sharks	2020	Northeast Conference	0
Temple University	Philadelphia	Pennsylvania	Owls	2020	American Athletic Conference	1

=== Former members ===
Institution	Tenure	Current conference	Conference championships
West Virginia University	1995–2012	Big 12 Conference	7
University of Maryland	1995–2014	Big Ten Conference	0
Rutgers University–New Brunswick	1995–2014	Big Ten Conference	0
North Carolina State University	1995–2023	Atlantic Coast Conference	6
University of North Carolina	1995–2023	Atlantic Coast Conference	5
University of Pittsburgh	1995–2023	Atlantic Coast Conference	1

== History ==
EAGL was formed on July 31, 1995, when eight universities on the East Coast of the United States: the University of Maryland, the University of New Hampshire, the University of North Carolina at Chapel Hill, North Carolina State University, the University of Pittsburgh, Rutgers University, Towson University, and West Virginia University joined to form a conference solely for women’s gymnastics. In August 1996, the EAGL officially became an affiliated member of the NCAA.

George Washington University joined the league in 2004. Towson, one of the original league members, left EAGL in 2005 to rejoin the Eastern College Athletic Conference. On February 3, 2012, the Atlantic Coast Conference announced that with the addition of Pittsburgh to the conference it would begin sponsoring a gymnastics championship, withdrawing the membership of the Maryland, North Carolina, North Carolina State, and Pittsburgh from the EAGL. However, Rutgers and Maryland both joined the Big Ten in 2014, a conference with an established gymnastics championship. West Virginia left the EAGL in 2012 upon joining the Big 12, a conference that also sponsored gymnastics. As such, not enough schools fielding gymnastics teams remained in the ACC for that conference to sponsor gymnastics so North Carolina, NC State, and Pitt remained in the EAGL. Towson rejoined the league in 2013. On March 5, 2020, Long Island University announced plans to add a women's gymnastics team for the 2020-21 school year and join the EAGL. On November 14, 2020, Temple University announced it would be leaving the Eastern Collegiate Athletic Conference to join the EAGL.

On June 17, 2021, the Atlantic Coast Conference announced that, with the addition of NCAA Gymnastics at Clemson University, the ACC would begin sponsoring the sport for the 2023-24 school year, which will move Pittsburgh, North Carolina State and North Carolina from the EAGL to the ACC starting with the 2024 season.

== Team champions ==
Year	University	Score
1996	West Virginia	194.6
1997	West Virginia	196.0
1998	West Virginia	195.5
1999	North Carolina State	196.05
2000	North Carolina State	196.00
2001	West Virginia	196.375
2002	North Carolina	196.425
2003	New Hampshire	196.75
2004	West Virginia	197.050
2005	North Carolina	195.975
2006	North Carolina	195.325
2007	North Carolina State	195.475
2008	West Virginia	196.050
2009	North Carolina State	195.700
2010	North Carolina	196.025
2011	North Carolina	195.300
2012	West Virginia	196.475
2013	North Carolina State	195.175
2014	New Hampshire	196.375
2015	George Washington	195.850
2016	Pittsburgh	195.675
2017	George Washington	196.275
2018	North Carolina State	196.625
2019	New Hampshire	195.950
2020	Not Held due to COVID-19	N/A
2021	Temple	196.500
2022	George Washington	196.325
2023	Towson	196.500
2024	Towson	197.300
2025	George Washington	195.950

== See also ==
- NCAA Women's Gymnastics championship
