= List of Elliott School of International Affairs people =

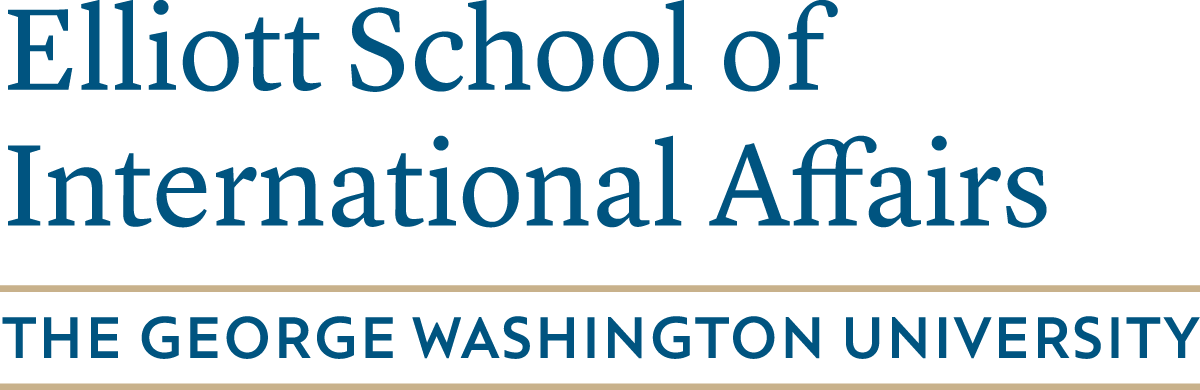

The list of Elliott School of International Affairs people includes notable graduates, professors, and administrators affiliated with the Elliott School of International Affairs of the George Washington University, located in Washington, D.C.

Among its alumni are numerous ambassadors, diplomats, politicians, and public figures, including Chang Dae-whan (former prime minister of South Korea), Tammy Duckworth (sitting U.S. senator), Rose Gottemoeller (current deputy-general of NATO), Ciarán Devane (current chief executive of the British Council), and John Shalikashvili (former Supreme Allied Commander). Notable faculty has included Christopher A. Kojm, chairman of the National Intelligence Council under President Obama, Moudud Ahmed, former prime minister of Bangladesh, Amitai Etzioni, former president of the American Sociological Association, William J. Crowe, former chairman of the Joint Chiefs of Staff, and S. M. Krishna, Foreign Minister of India.

== Alumni ==
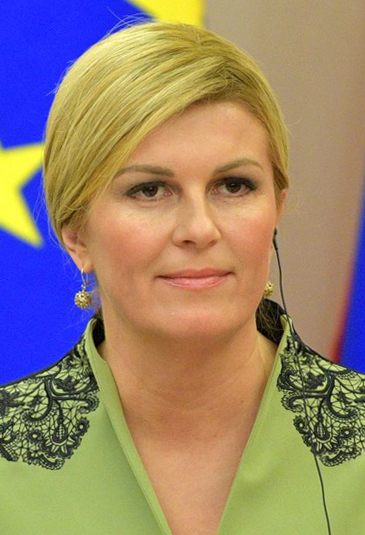
Current President of Croatia, Kolinda Grabar-Kitarović; F.S. '03

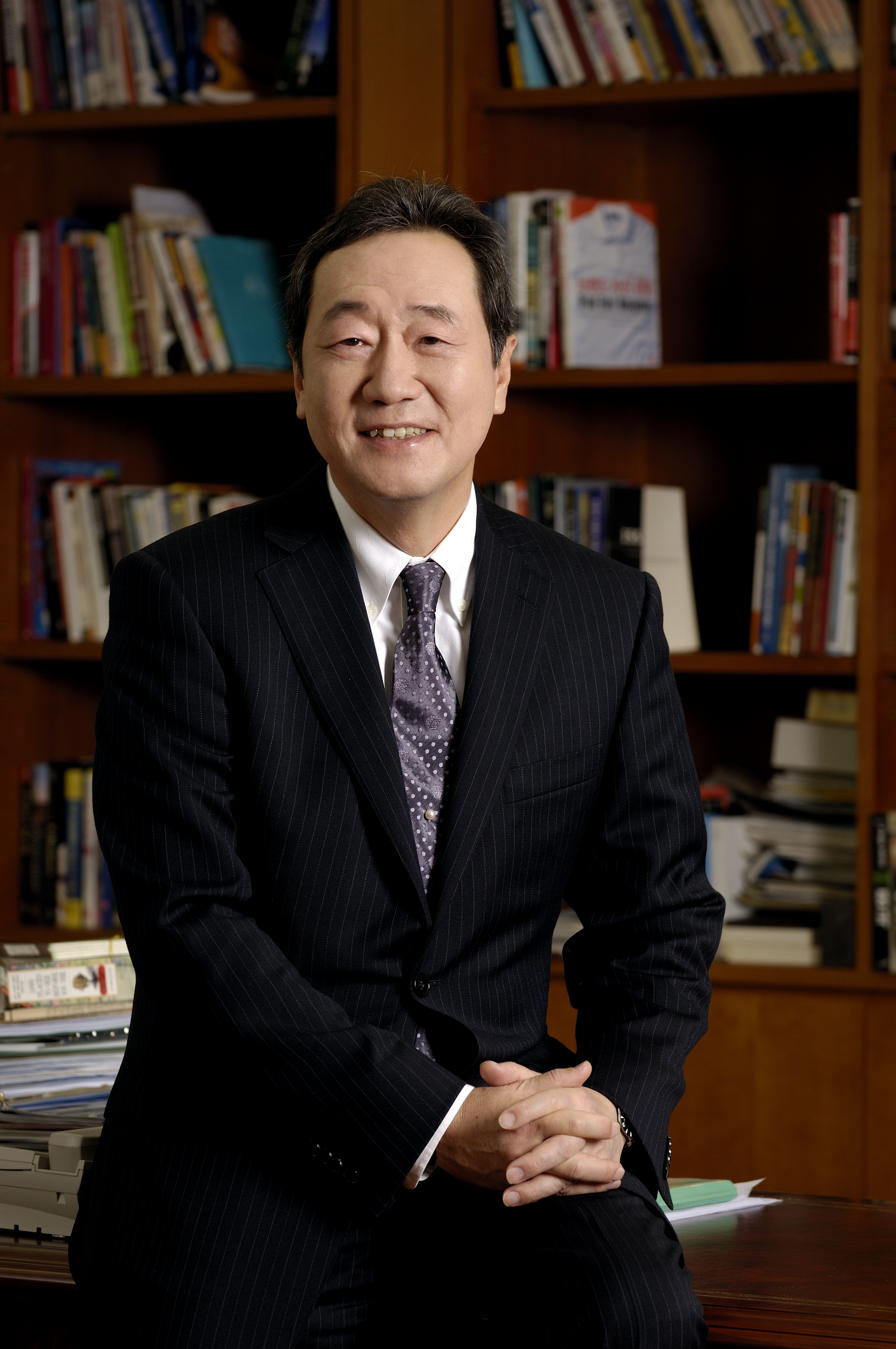
Chang Dae-whan (MA '74), former prime minister of South Korea

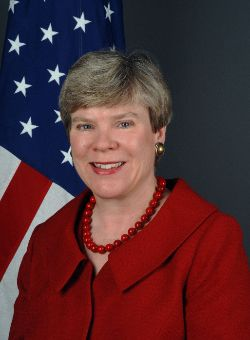
Rose Gottemoeller (MA '81), 16th Deputy-General of the North Atlantic Treaty Organization (NATO)

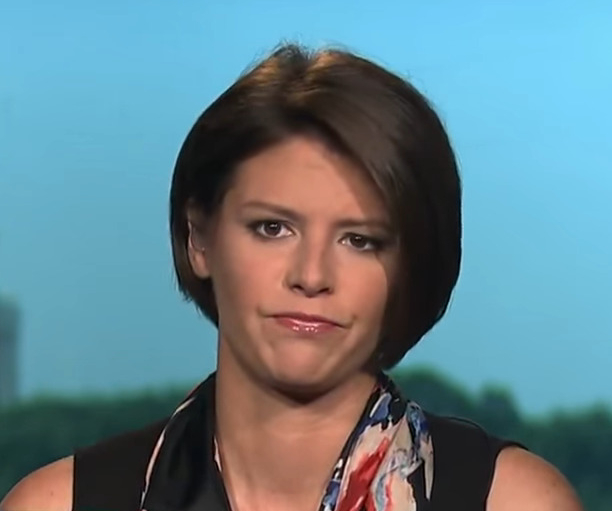
Kasie Hunt (BA '06), host of Kasie DC on MSNBC

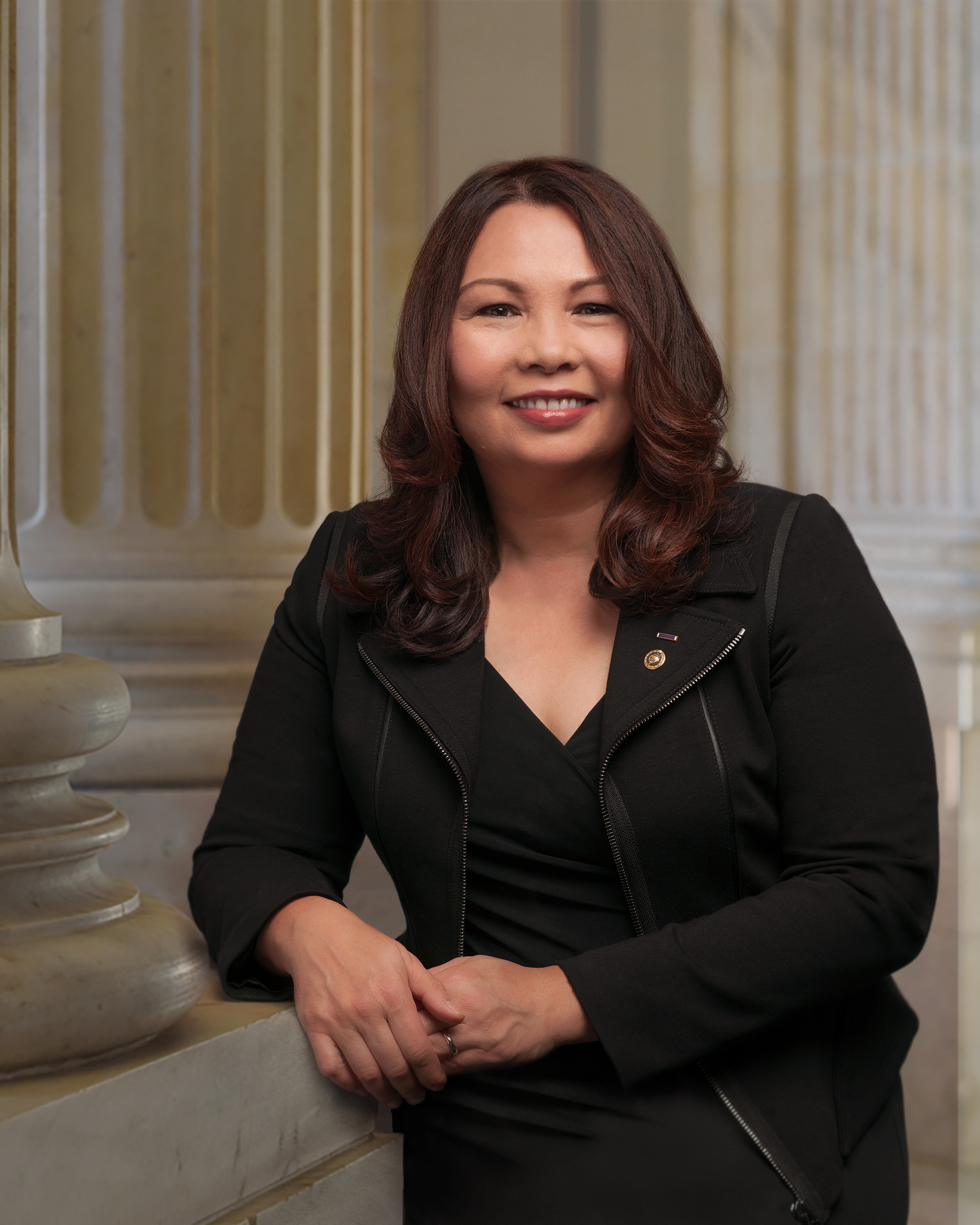
Tammy Duckworth (MA '96), U.S. senator

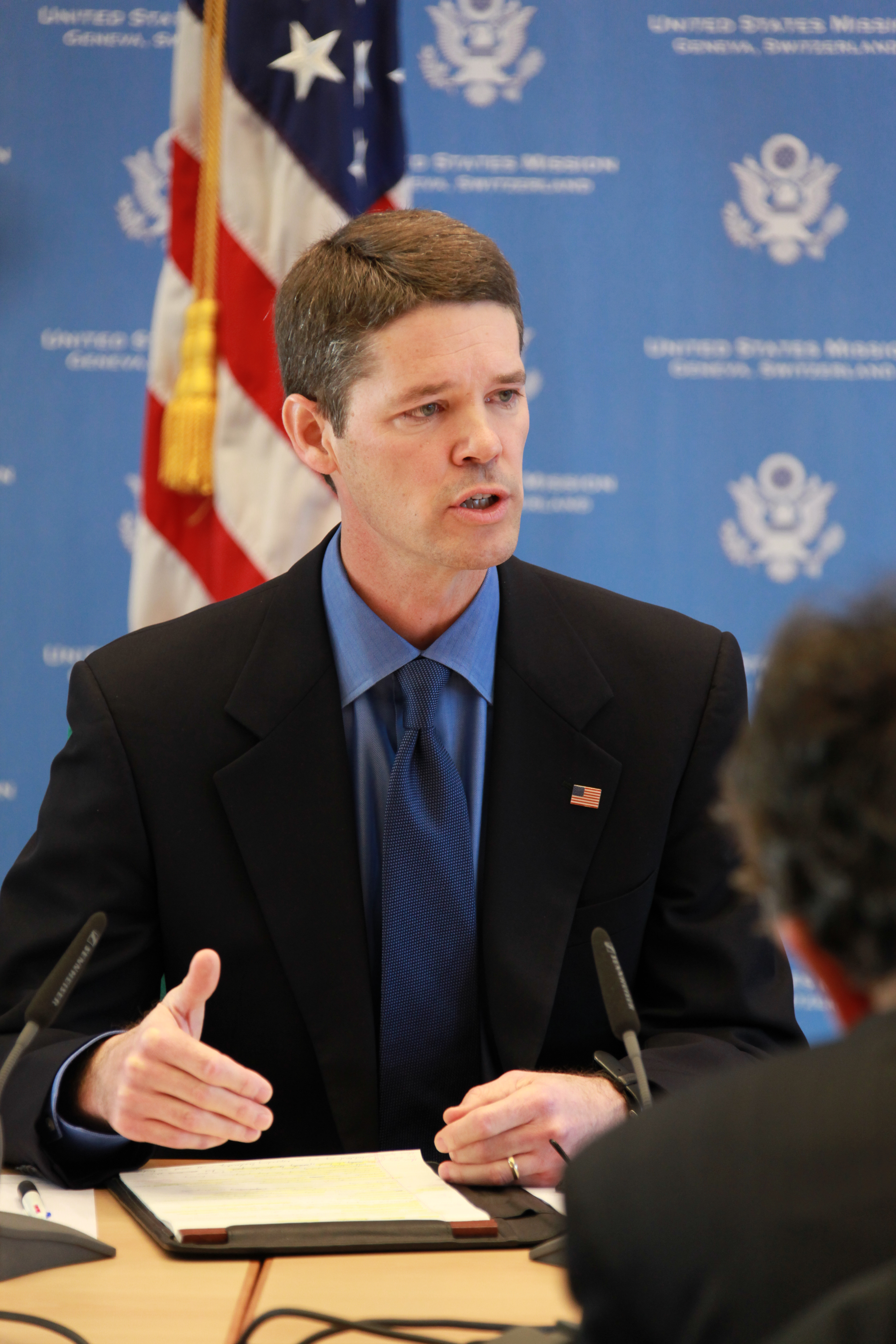
Michael Punke (BA '86), Vice President of Amazon Web Services, former U.S. Ambassador to the World Trade Organization

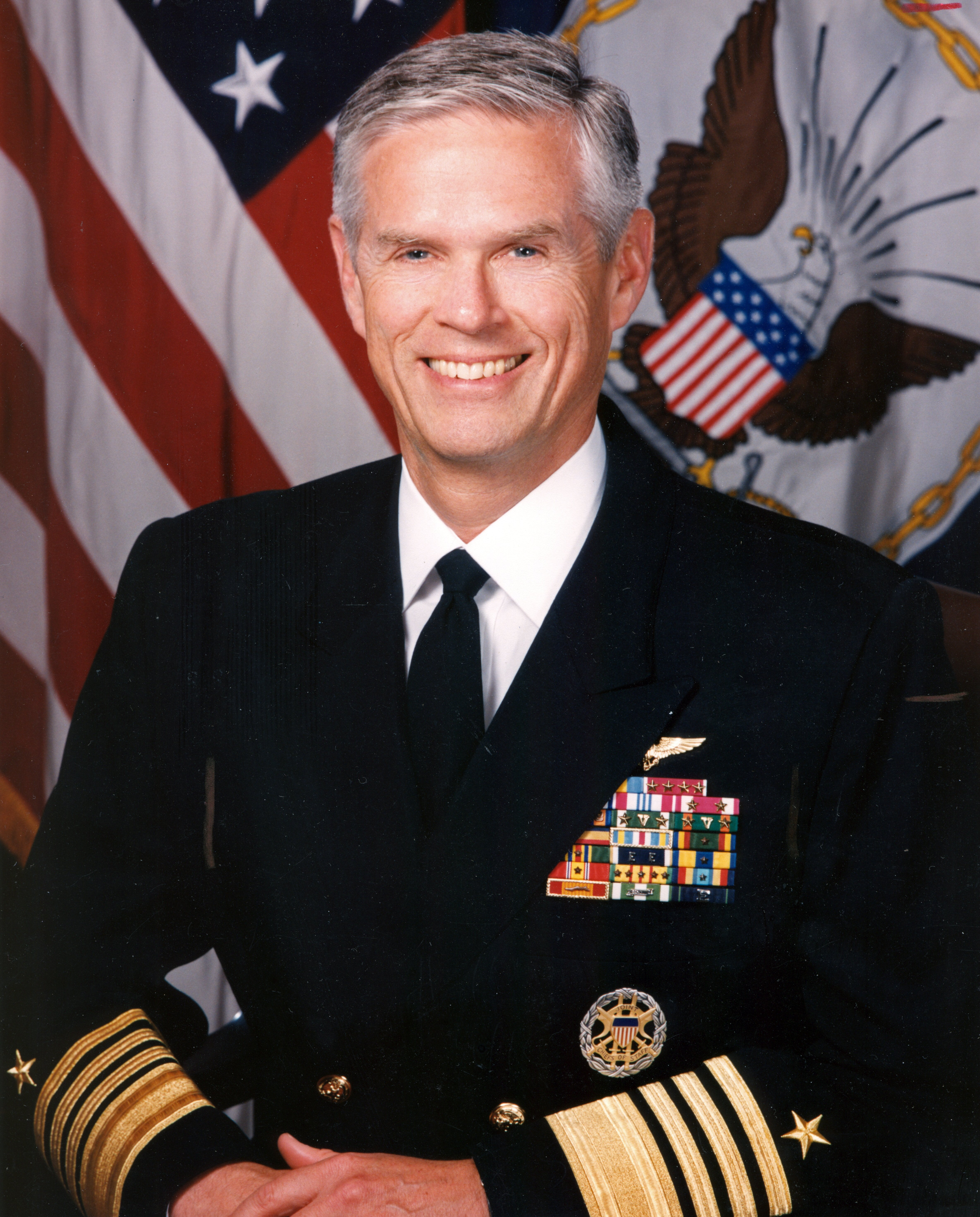
Joseph Prueher (MA '69), U.S. Ambassador to China

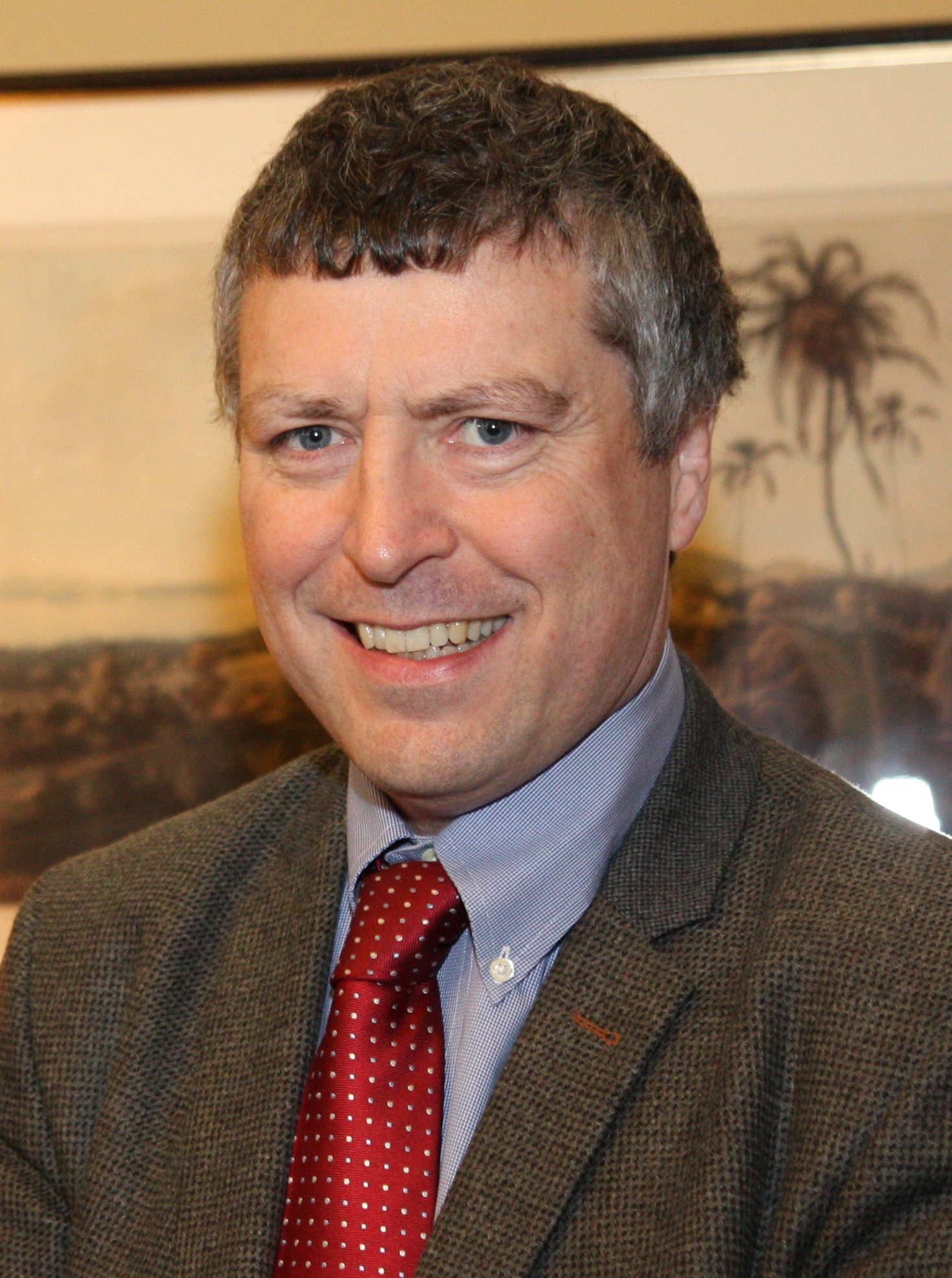
Ciarán Devane (MIPP '06), CEO of the British Council

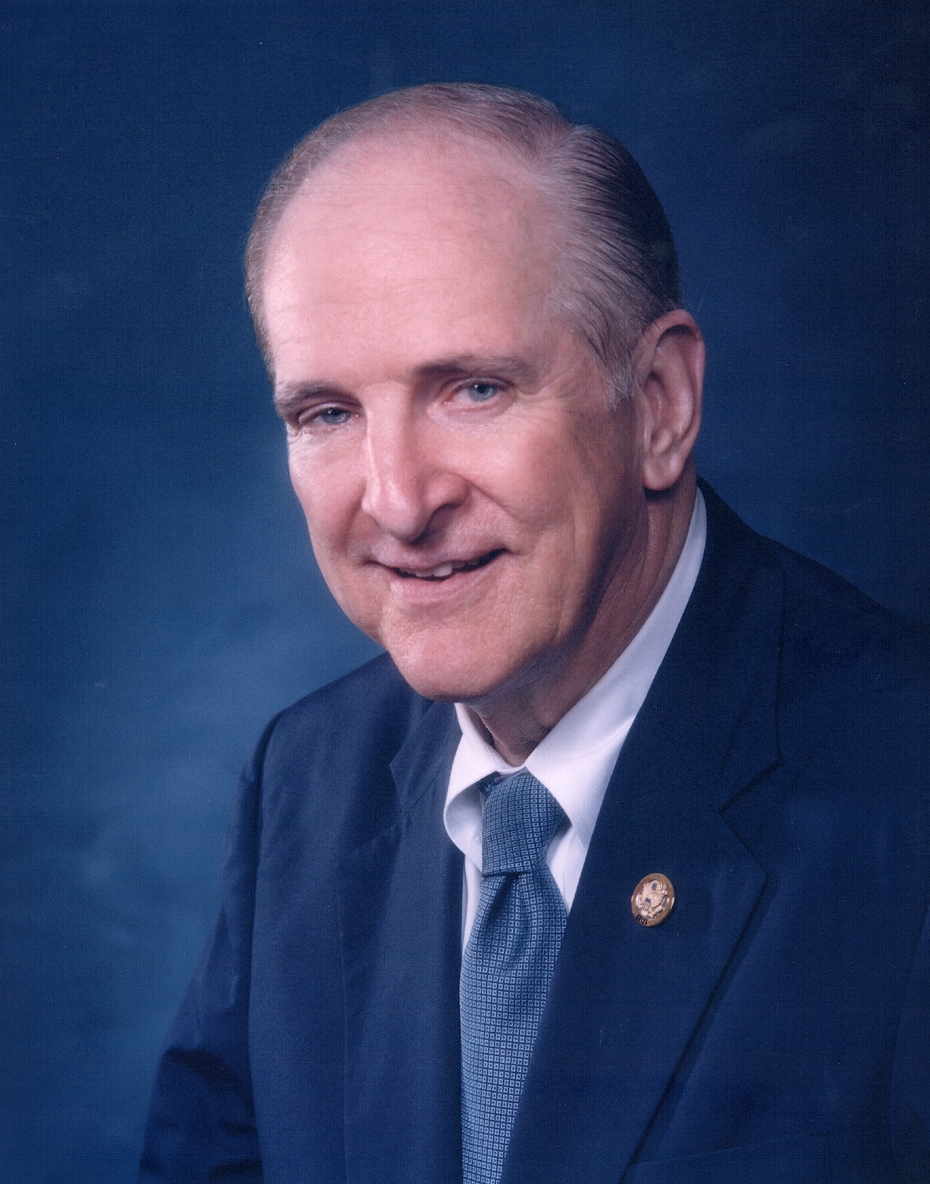
Sam Johnson (MA '76), U.S. congressman, former chairman of the House Ways and Means Committee

=== Journalism ===
- Adam Ciralsky – Emmy Award and Peabody Award-winning journalist of 60 Minutes and NBC News
- Diana B. Henriques (BA '69) – Pulitzer Prize finalist and New York Times journalist
- Kasie Hunt (BA '06) – MSNBC and NBC News correspondent
- Matt Medved – Spin editor-in-chief
- Josh Rogin – CNN political analyst, Bloomberg View foreign policy analyst
- Kim A. Snyder (BA 83) – Variety Magazine contributor, director of Sundance Film Festival-nominated documentary I Remember Me

=== Diplomacy ===
- Cresencio S. Arcos Jr. – U.S. Ambassador to Honduras
- Richard L. Baltimore – U.S. Ambassador to Oman
- Elliott Charng – Taiwanese Ambassador to Australia, New Zealand, and India
- Edward "Skip" Gnehm – U.S. Ambassador to Jordan, Kuwait and Australia
- Robert P. Jackson – U.S. Ambassador to Ghana and Cameroon
- Lyle Franklin Lane – U.S. Ambassador to Uruguay and Paraguay
- Marisa Lino (MA '72) – U.S. Ambassador to Albania
- Francis Terry McNamara (MA '72) – U.S. Ambassador to Gabon and São Tomé and Príncipe
- Joseph Prueher (MA '69) U.S. Ambassador to China
- Michael Punke – U.S. Ambassador to the World Trade Organization
- David H. Shinn (MA '64) – U.S. Ambassador to Ethiopia and Burkina Faso
- Kurt Volker (MA '87) – U.S. Ambassador to NATO

=== Law ===
- Andrew P. Bakaj (BA '03) – former Department of Defense and CIA official; lead counsel for the whisteblower during the impeachment inquiry and the subsequent impeachment of President Donald Trump
- Denise Krepp (BA '95) – Chief Counsel for the United States Maritime Administration
- Miguel Méndez (AB '62) – Stanford Law School legal scholar, deputy director of California Rural Legal Assistance
- Neil Thomas Proto (MA '69) – General Counsel to President Jimmy Carter on Nuclear Safety, fellow of the Royal Geographical Society in London

=== Politics ===
- Bob Barr (MA '72) – U.S. congressman from Georgia
- Jennifer Shasky Calvery – director of the U.S. Treasury Department Financial Crimes Enforcement Network
- Chang Dae-whan (MA '74) – Prime Minister of South Korea
- Jeremiah Denton (MA '64) – U.S. senator from Alabama
- Tammy Duckworth (MA '96) – U.S. senator from Illinois
- Sam Johnson (MS '74) – U.S. congressman from Texas
- Sara Gideon (BA '94) – Speaker of the House of Representatives of Maine
- Kolinda Grabar-Kitarović (F.S. '03) – President of Croatia (2015–present)
- Khatuna Kalmakhelidze (MA '07) – Minister of Corrections and Legal Assistance of the Republic of Georgia
- Stephen Maitland – Pennsylvania state representative
- K. T. McFarland (BA '73) – Deputy National Security Advisor
- Linda Melconian – Massachusetts state senator
- Arifa Khalid Pervaiz – Congresswoman of the National Assembly of Pakistan
- Caroline Simmons – member of President Barack Obama's Transition Team
- Philip S. Smith – member of the Republican National Committee
- William Timmons – South Carolina state senator
- Robert J. Winglass – Maine state representative

=== Economics ===
- Richard Carson – most-cited environmental economist in the world

=== Business ===
- David A. Nadler – vice-chairman of Marsh & McLennan Companies
- Michael Punke – vice president of Amazon Web Services, former U.S. Ambassador to the World Trade Organization
- Danny Sebright – president of the U.S.-U.A.E. Business Council, former Policy Director of the Office of the Secretary of Defense

=== Military ===
- Colonel Mark M. Boatner III – Croix de Guerre-decorated soldier and military historian
- General Edwin H. Burba Jr. – four-star U.S. Army general, Commander-in-Chief of United States Army Forces Command
- General John T. Chain Jr. – U.S. Air Force general, Board of Directors member for Northrop Grumman and the Kemper Corporation
- Lt. General Lincoln D. Faurer – Director of the National Security Agency
- Admiral Sylvester R. Foley Jr. – Commander in Chief of the U.S. Pacific Fleet
- Admiral John B. Hayes (MA '64) – 16th Commandant of the U.S. Coast Guard
- General Frederick Kroesen – commanding general of the Seventh United States Army
- Vice Admiral Julien J. LeBourgeois – President of the Naval War College
- General Fred K. Mahaffey – four-star U.S. Army general, Commander-in-Chief of U.S. Readiness Command
- Rear Admiral Fran McKee – first female officer to hold the rank of rear admiral in the U.S. Navy, Alabama Women's Hall of Fame inductee
- Lt. General Hal Moore – Distinguished Service Cross and Order of Saint Maurice-decorated lieutenant general and military author
- General James P. Mullins – four-star U.S. Air Force general, Commander-in-Chief of Air Force Logistics Command
- Major General Charles C. Noble – engineer on the Manhattan Project
- General Bryce Poe II – four-star U.S. Air Force general, Commander of Air Force Logistics Command
- General Thomas M. Ryan Jr. – U.S. Air Force general, Commander-in-Chief of Military Airlift Command
- Captain Shanti Sethi – first Indian-American woman to command a major U.S. Navy warship, the USS Decatur
- General John M. Shalikashvili (MA '70) – Supreme Allied Commander and Chairman of the Joint Chiefs of Staff
- Rear Admiral Sumner Shapiro – director of the Office of Naval Intelligence
- Admiral Owen W. Siler (MA '68) – 15th Commandant of the U.S. Coast Guard
- General Donn A. Starry – four-star U.S. Army general, Commander-in-Chief of United States Strike Command
- Admiral William O. Studeman – Deputy Director of the Central Intelligence Agency, admiral of the United States Navy
- Lt. General Kenneth L. Tallman – 8th Superintendent of the United States Air Force Academy
- Major General Richard M. Wells – Director of the Defense Mapping Agency

=== International organizations ===
- Kathryne Bomberger – Director-General of the International Commission on Missing Persons
- Ciarán Devane – Chief Executive of the British Council
- Marc Garlasco – Senior Military Advisor for the Human Rights Council, Senior Civilian Protection Officer for the United Nations Assistance Mission in Afghanistan
- Rose Gottemoeller (MA '81) – 16th Deputy-General of the North Atlantic Treaty Organization (NATO)
- Olav Kjørven – UNICEF Director for Public Partnerships, former Norwegian State Secretary for International Development

=== Scholars ===
- Roderic Ai Camp (MA '67) – Mexico-United States relations specialist, New York Times, The Wall Street Journal, and BBC contributor, Woodrow Wilson International Center for Scholars Board of Directors member
- Ross Horning (MA, '52; Ph.D., '58) – historian
- [ Sina Azodi ]] - Elliott School of International Affairs Assistant Professor of Middle East Politics

=== Other ===
- W. W. Behrens Jr. – founder of the National Oceanic and Atmospheric Administration
- Reona Ito – The American Prize-winning orchestral conductor
- F. Lynn McNulty – "father" of U.S. federal information security, director of Information Security for the U.S. State Department
- Gorgi Popstefanov – 2016 and 2010 Macedonian National Men's Cycling Champion
- Sarah Reinertsen – ITU World Triathlon Championship-winning paratriathlete

== Faculty ==
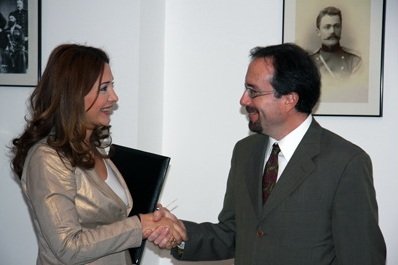
Khatuna Kalmakhelidze (MA '07), Minister of Corrections & Legal Assistance of Georgia

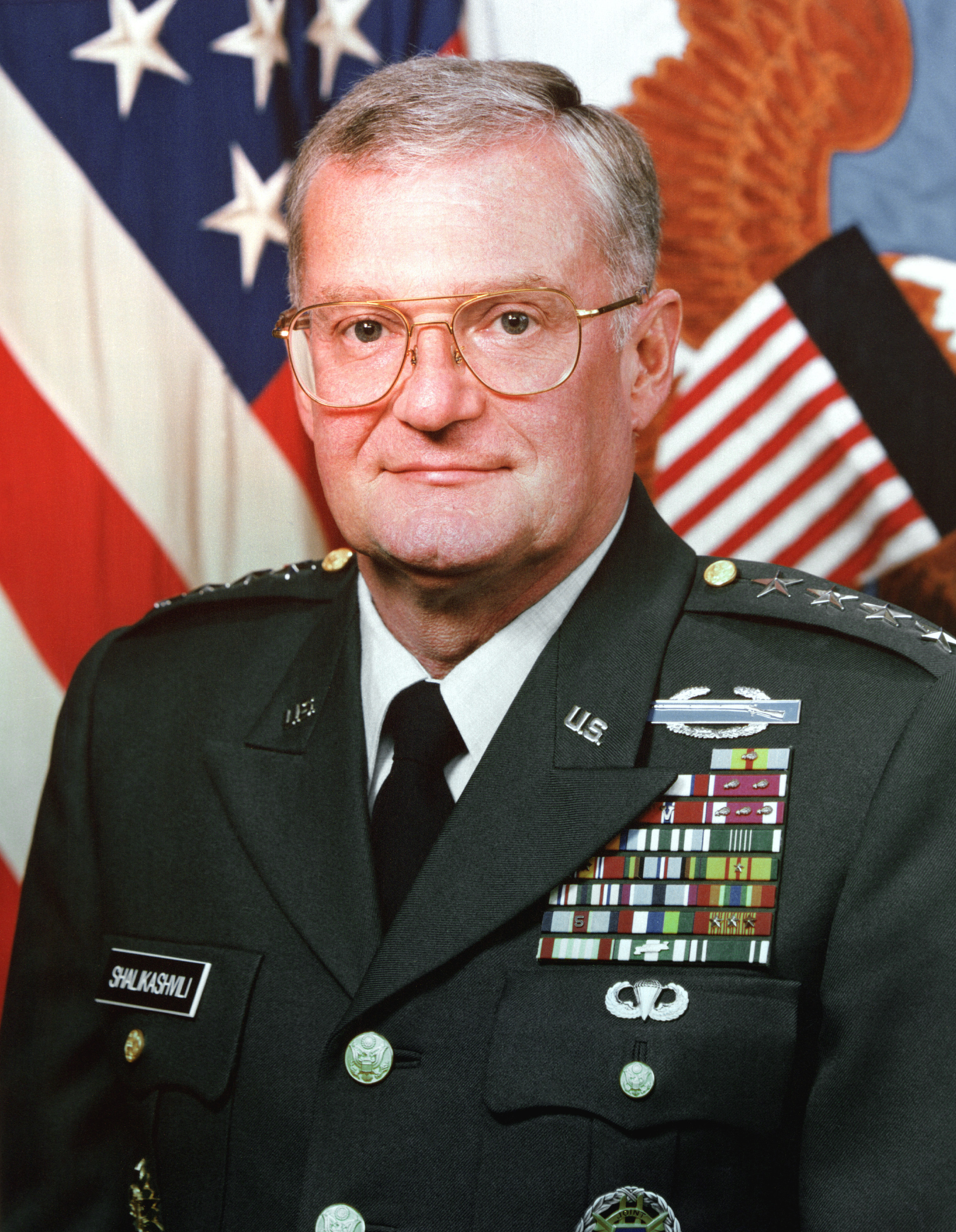
John Shalikashvili (MA '70), Supreme Allied Commander

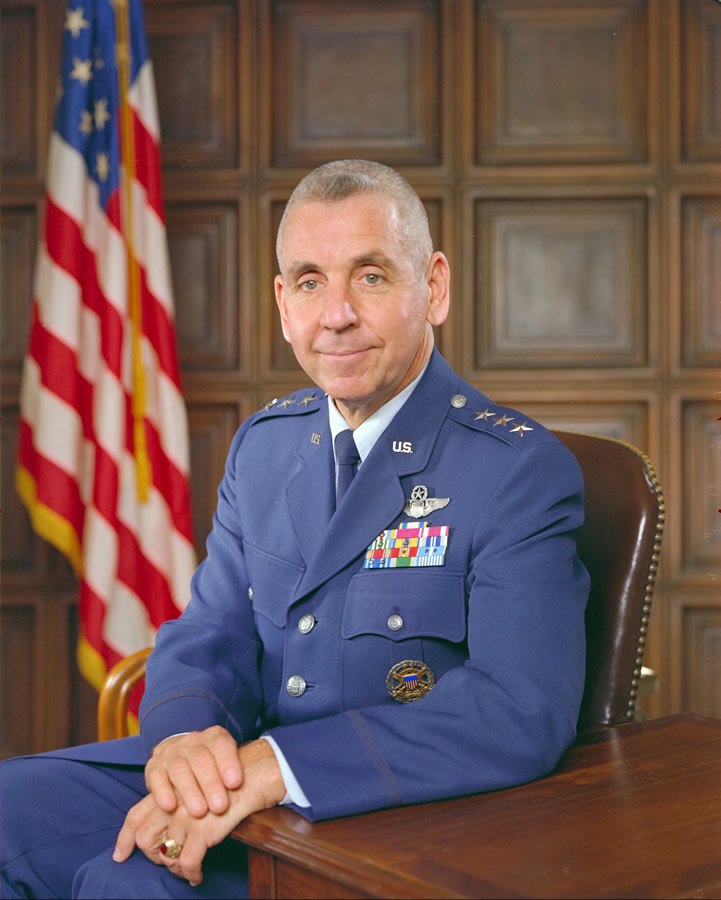
Lincoln D. Faurer (MA '68), 10th Director of the National Security Agency

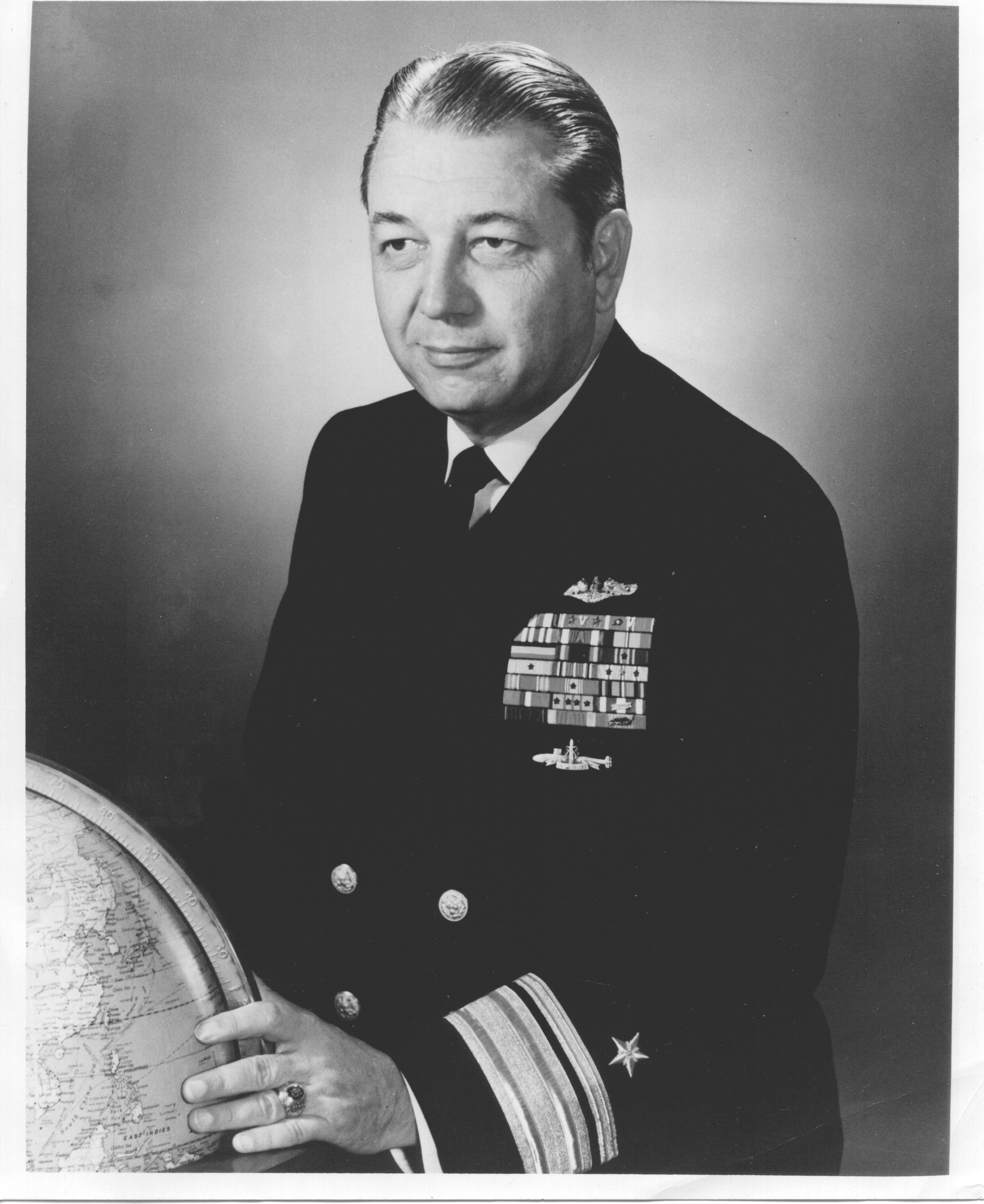
Vice Admiral W. W. Behrens Jr. (MA '64), founder of the National Oceanic and Atmospheric Administration

=== Scholars and researchers ===
- Rouben Paul Adalian – Director of the Armenian National Institute
- Sina Azodi- Assistant Professor of Middle East Politics
- Sabina Alkire – Director of the Oxford Poverty and Human Development Initiative
- Pavel Baev – Senior Fellow at the Brookings Institution
- Michael N. Barnett – famed Constructivist theorist
- Nathan J. Brown – former director of the Institute for Middle East Studies, Board Advisor to the Project on Middle East Democracy
- Robert Entman – Humboldt Prize-winning communications scientist
- Martha Finnemore – leader of the constructivist school of international relations theory
- Charles Glaser – famed Defensive Realist theorist
- James Hershberg – former director of the Cold War International History Project at the Woodrow Wilson Center
- Dina Rizk Khoury – Guggenheim Fellow
- Marc Lynch – director of the Institute for Middle East Studies, Senior Fellow at the Center for a New American Security
- Harris Mylonas – editor in chief of Nationalities Papers
- Walter Reich – AAAS Award for Scientific Freedom and Responsibility-winning international relations scholar
- Howard Sachar – National Jewish Book Award-winning Middle East historian
- David Shambaugh – Senior Fellow at the Brookings Institution
- Stephen C. Smith – director of the Institute for International Economic Policy
- Ronald H. Spector – Samuel Eliot Morison Prize-winning military historian

=== Diplomacy ===
- Stephen Biddle – Member of the Council on Foreign Relations
- Matthew Levinger – Senior Program Officer of the United States Institute of Peace
- Andrew A. Michta – adjunct fellow at the Center for Strategic and International Studies

==== Assistant Secretaries of State ====
- Esther Brimmer – former Assistant Secretary of State for International Organization Affairs
- Bathsheba Nell Crocker – former Assistant Secretary of State for International Organization Affairs
- Karl Inderfurth – former Assistant Secretary of State for South and Central Asian Affairs
- Thomas E. McNamara – former Assistant Secretary of State for Political-Military Affairs
- George Moose – former Assistant Secretary of State for African Affairs
- Eric Newsom – former Assistant Secretary of State for Political-Military Affairs
- Gaston J. Sigur Jr. – Assistant Secretary of State for East Asian and Pacific Affairs

==== U.S. Ambassadors ====
- Thomas J. Dodd Jr. – former U.S. Ambassador to Costa Rica and Uruguay
- Edward "Skip" Gnehm – former U.S. Ambassador to Jordan, Kuwait and Australia
- Lino Gutierrez – former U.S. Ambassador to Argentina and Nicaragua
- Joseph LeBaron – former U.S. Ambassador to Qatar and Mauritania
- Ronald D. Palmer – former U.S. Ambassador to Togo, Malaysia, and Mauritius
- David H. Shinn – former U.S. Ambassador to Ethiopia and Burkina Faso

==== Foreign ambassadors ====
- Michael Oren – former Israeli Ambassador to the United States
- Arturo Sarukhan – former Mexican Ambassador to United States
- Farooq Sobhan – former Bangladeshi Ambassador to China, India, and Malaysia

=== Politicians ===
- Moudud Ahmed – former prime minister of Bangladesh
- Mickey Edwards – former U.S. congressman from Oklahoma, chairman of the House Republican Policy Committee
- Leon Fuerth – former national security adviser to U.S. vice president Al Gore
- Robert Hutchings – former chairman of the National Intelligence Council
- Christopher A. Kojm – former chairman of the National Intelligence Council
- S. M. Krishna – former foreign minister of India
- Allison Macfarlane – former chairwoman of the Nuclear Regulatory Commission
- John Negroponte – former director of National Intelligence, U.S. deputy secretary of state, U.S. ambassador to the United Nations
- Scott Pace – chief executive of the National Space Council
- Lawrence Wilkerson – former chief of staff to United States secretary of state Colin Powell
- Robert O. Work – former U.S. deputy secretary of defense

=== Economics ===
- James Foster – World Bank board advisor

=== Military ===
- William J. Crowe – former chairman of the Joint Chiefs of Staff

=== Journalism ===
- Henry Farrell – Foreign Policy and Washington Post contributor
- David Alan Grier – Computer Magazine columnist
- Roy Richard Grinker – editor of Anthropological Quarterly, New York Times and PBS NewsHour contributor
- Selig S. Harrison – Washington Post, New York Times, and The Financial Times-contributing journalist specializing in Southeast Asia

=== International organizations ===
- Michael M. Cernea – World Bank Senior Advisor for Social Policy
- Cynthia McClintock – Center for International Policy Board of Directors member, former president of the Latin American Studies Association
- Nikolai Zlobin – president of the Center on Global Interests

=== Other ===
- Pascale Ehrenfreund – CEO of the German Aerospace Center, first woman President of the Austrian Science Fund
- Amitai Etzioni – former president of the American Sociological Association
- Harry Harding – founding dean of the Batten School of Leadership & Public Policy
- Ray O. Johnson – former chief technology officer of Lockheed Martin
- John Logsdon – former member of the NASA Advisory Council
- William Luers – former president of the Metropolitan Museum of Art
- James N Rosenau – former president of the International Studies Association

== See also ==
- List of George Washington University alumni
- List of George Washington University faculty
