= Andrew P. Bakaj =

American attorney

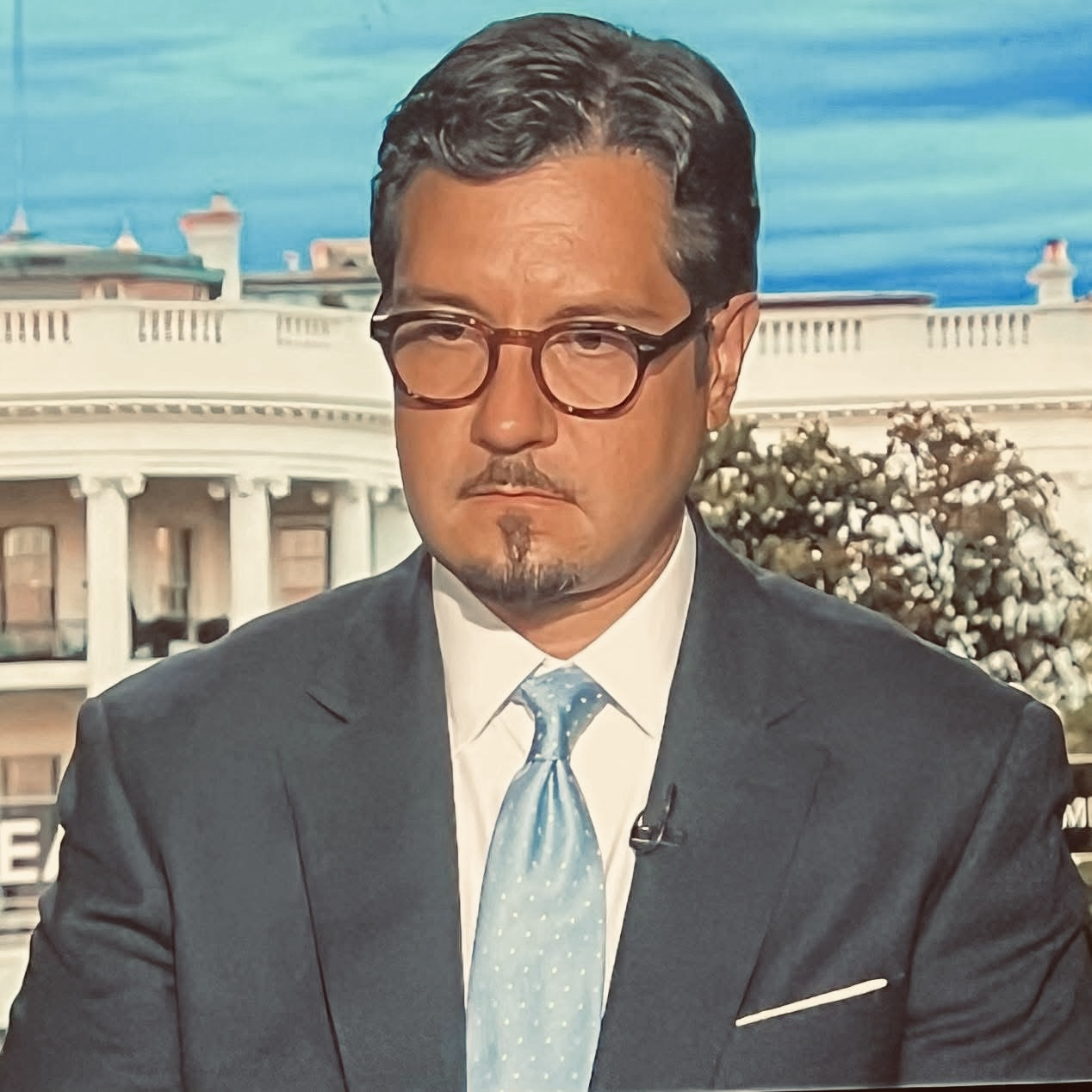
- Born: Stamford, Connecticut, US
- Education: The George Washington University (BA); Syracuse University (JD)
- Occupation: Attorney
- Known for: Lead counsel for the Whisteblower during the Impeachment Inquiry and the subsequent first Impeachment of President Donald Trump
- Website: https://compassrosepllc.com

Andrew P. Bakaj (/bɑːkɑːi/; Ukrainian: Андрі́й П. Бакай; born 1982) is an American attorney and former intelligence officer with the Central Intelligence Agency (CIA). He was the principal attorney representing the whistleblower who filed the initial complaint that led to the launch of multiple investigations by the United States Congress into the Trump–Ukraine scandal, the impeachment inquiry into President Donald Trump, and, ultimately, Trump's first impeachment.

Bakaj is the founding and managing partner of Compass Rose Legal Group. He represented multiple whistleblowers and government officials in the U.S. House of Representatives investigations into the Trump administration. Previously while serving as a U.S. government official, he designed the legal and investigative apparatus to protect intelligence community whistleblowers.

In his professional legal capacity, Bakaj has advised and counseled numerous senior U.S. Government officials as well as numerous European governments, including the governments of the United Kingdom and France, in a variety of legal and investigative areas. Press coverage has compared both his career and his casework to the novels of John le Carré.

== Early life and education ==
Bakaj at 10 Downing Street, London

Bakaj was born in Stamford, Connecticut, and is a graduate of Trinity Catholic High School. He subsequently attended The George Washington University, Elliott School of International Affairs in Washington, D.C., from which he earned a bachelor's degree in International Affairs with a concentration in National Security Policy.

Bakaj was born in Stamford, Connecticut, and is of Ukrainian descent and a Ukrainian Catholic. He is a graduate of Trinity Catholic High School. He subsequently attended The George Washington University, Elliott School of International Affairs in Washington, D.C., from which he earned a bachelor's degree in International Affairs with a concentration in National Security Policy.

Bakaj earned his Juris Doctor from Syracuse University College of Law in Syracuse, New York, specializing in national security law and public international law.

== Career ==
Bakaj began his career with Senator Daniel Patrick Moynihan in both the Senator's Washington and Manhattan offices. He subsequently worked for Senators Chuck Schumer and Hillary Clinton. Bakaj's internship with Clinton coincided with the September 11 attacks, and he worked directly for her foreign policy advisor. Subsequently, in 2002, Bakaj served the Department of State overseas with the U.S. Embassy in Kyiv, Ukraine. During his tour and while traveling to Lviv, Ukraine, on mission, a deadly air show accident occurred at the Sknyliv Airfield. Due to his proficiency in Ukrainian and proximity to the disaster, Bakaj coordinated with the Embassy in Kyiv to secure emergency aid from the United States.

Bakaj continued his public service while in law school, clerking with the Department of Justice. Upon graduating law school, he became a government official with the Department of Defense Office of Inspector General and subsequently the Central Intelligence Agency Office of Inspector General.

Bakaj worked on whistleblower reprisal investigations at the Department of Defense. He later transitioned to the CIA, where he was in charge of implementing Presidential Policy Directive 19 (PPD-19), Protecting Whistleblowers with Access to Classified Information.

In 2014, Bakaj was instrumental in protecting CIA officers within the Office of Inspector General who reported misconduct within their chain-of-command and, ultimately, to him. The disclosures included allegations that individuals within his own office (the CIA Office of Inspector General) fabricated evidence in a federal criminal investigation in order to obtain a false prosecution.

In elevating the matter, he protected the whistleblowers who disclosed the information to him. Because he refused to compromise their identity, Bakaj himself was ultimately reprised against by then-Inspector General David B. Buckley, an Obama appointee.

In 2017, President Donald Trump nominated Christopher Sharpley to assume the role of CIA Inspector General. Shortly after Sharpley's confirmation hearing, Bakaj presented evidence to the Senate Select Committee on Intelligence establishing that Sharpley was less than candid during his confirmation hearing. As a result of Bakaj's disclosure, the White House subsequently withdrew Sharpley's nomination. In 2018, Sharpley resigned from the CIA.

In 2019, a years-long investigation found that Buckley illegally reprised against Bakaj.

Upon transitioning from government service, Bakaj assumed the role as Special Of Counsel with Mark S. Zaid, P.C. and founded Compass Rose Legal Group, PLLC.

== First impeachment of President Donald Trump ==
Bakaj was lead counsel representing the whistleblower who filed the initial complaint that led to the launch of multiple investigations by the United States Congress into the Trump–Ukraine scandal, the impeachment inquiry into President Donald Trump, and, ultimately, Trump's first impeachment. Bakaj's co-counsel was Mark Zaid.

A friend of the whistleblower, who is an attorney and an expert on national security law, referred the whistleblower to Bakaj, who had more expertise on whistleblower procedure and law. Bakaj provided the whistleblower guidance on filing the complaint. On August 11, 2019, per Bakaj's guidance, the whistleblower filed the complaint with the Inspector General of the Intelligence Community (IGIC). The whistleblower's complaint was deemed credible and a matter of "urgent concern" by the IGIC. Under federal law, when the IGIC determines that a complaint credibly raises an urgent concern, he or she forwards it to the relevant agency head (here, the DNI), who is required to forward it to the congressional intelligence committees within seven days. In this case, however, Acting Director of National Intelligence Joseph Maguire withheld the complaint from Congress.

On September 9, 2019, Bakaj hand-delivered a letter informing the House Permanent Select Committee on Intelligence of the complaint's existence and that “The ICIG has informed [Bakaj] that . . . . my client’s disclosure will not be transmitted to Congress because the Acting Director of National Intelligence views the matter as 'outside the scope' of the applicable whistleblower statute". The next day, the committee's Democratic chairman, Adam Schiff, wrote Maguire demanding the release the complaint, and was rebuffed. Maguire later testified that the White House counsel had told him he could not release the whistle-blower's complaint to Congress because it was covered by executive privilege. Schiff went public. Facing a subpoena, the DNI finally released the complaint to Congress on September 25, 2019.

On September 24, 2019, because his client's complaint was being blocked from transmittal to Congress, Bakaj sent a letter to Maguire providing "formal notice" of his intent to contact congressional intelligence committees directly concerning the matter. The following day the White House authorized the complaint be transmitted to congress.

On November 7, 2019, Bakaj sent a letter to the White House warning President Trump to "cease and desist" calling for the public disclosure of the whistleblower's identity and "engaging in rhetoric and activity that places the whistleblower and their family in physical danger." He said the president would be legally and morally liable if anyone were to be "physically harmed as a result of his, or his surrogates', behavior."

It has been reported that Bakaj and his co-counsel, Mark Zaid, have received death threats that are being investigated by the FBI.

In a New York Times op-ed on March 2, 2020, Bakaj advocated protecting, expanding, and enhancing federal whistleblower protection laws.

In a Washington Post op-ed on April 14, 2020, Bakaj expressed concern about the purging of inspectors general following Michael Atkinson's firing by President Trump, stating that "alarm bells should be going off". Bakaj and authors Zaid and John Tye discussed the impact of such actions. In light of the President questioning the independence and integrity of the Health and Human Services Inspector General and removing Glenn A. Fine as chairman overseeing the Pandemic Response Accountability Committee, a position for which he was selected by his peers, they wrote about the need for effective government oversight during the COVID-19 pandemic.

== Facebook Files ==
Following her initial disclosures, Bakaj took over as lead counsel representing Frances Haugen for her whistleblower activities against Facebook in what has become known as the Facebook Files. In October 2021, The Washington Post reported "Andrew Bakaj, who represents Haugen at Whistleblower Aid, said it was 'immediately clear' that she had materials that were critical for lawmakers and regulators seeking to hold the company accountable. 'She's a perfect example of why whistleblowers are so important: Without her, we didn't know what we didn't know,' Bakaj told the Post." Haugen is portrayed in the 2026 feature film The Social Reckoning, written and directed by Aaron Sorkin

== Other notable casework ==
Bakaj was among the attorneys representing Lieutenant Colonel Eugene Vindman, whose twin brother Alexander Vindman served as a key witness in President Donald Trump's first impeachment, in a whistleblower reprisal complaint filed with the Pentagon's Inspector General. In May 2022, the Department of Defense Inspector General found that Trump administration officials had unlawfully retaliated against Vindman for his protected communications. Vindman was subsequently elected to Congress in November 2024, representing Virginia's 7th congressional district.

Bakaj was also part of the team representing Brian Murphy, the former Acting Under Secretary for the Office of Intelligence and Analysis at the Department of Homeland Security, who alleged he was directed to suppress intelligence assessments on Russian election interference and white supremacist threats.

In 2025, Bakaj represented an intelligence community whistleblower who filed a complaint with the Inspector General of the Intelligence Community alleging wrongdoing by Director of National Intelligence Tulsi Gabbard. The complaint was reportedly so highly classified that it was kept in a safe and not transmitted to Congress for about eight months. The Wall Street Journal, which first reported its existence, described the circumstances as a "cloak-and-dagger mystery reminiscent of a John le Carré novel."

== Awards and professional recognition ==
- Washingtonian named Bakaj among Washington’s "Most Influential People" (Legal Intelligencia), writing "Policymaking changes as governments come in and out of power. But the bedrock underlying it—expertise that enables public service and good-faith debate and explains why idealists still come to Washington—remains. Here's a look at who's wielding that influence right now."
- Washingtonian named Bakaj among Washington's "Top Lawyers: Whistleblowers".
- Bakaj has been listed in The Best Lawyers in America as among the top 5% of attorneys in the United States, noting his work in qui tam matters.
- The Metropolitan Washington Employment Lawyers Association named him Lawyer of the Year for 2020.
- In 2011 Bakaj was a member of a team named as a finalist in the Samuel J. Heyman Service to America Award (National Security and International Affairs).

== See also ==
- List of George Washington University alumni
- List of Elliott School of International Affairs people
