= Mark Zaid =

American lawyer

Personal details
- Born: 1967 Manhasset, New York
- Party: Independent
- Education: University of Rochester (BA); Albany Law School (JD)

Mark S. Zaid (born 1967) is an American attorney based in Washington, D.C. with a practice focused on national security law, freedom of speech constitutional claims, and government accountability.

In 1998, Zaid founded the James Madison Project, an organization dedicated to reducing government secrecy. It is interested in the Freedom of Information Act (FOIA) and government whistleblowers. He is a co-editor of Litigation Under the Federal Open Government Laws. He is a co-founder of a legal organization called Whistleblower Aid, intended to help whistleblowers forward their concerns without incurring legal liability.

== Early life and education ==
Born in Manhasset, New York in 1967, Zaid is the grandson of Rabbi David Max Eichhorn. In 2004, Zaid published a book of his grandfather's letters about his experiences in World War II and the Holocaust as a U.S. Army Chaplain. He is a 1989 graduate of the University of Rochester in Rochester, New York and a 1992 graduate of Albany Law School of Union University in Albany, where he served as an associate editor of the Albany Law Review.

While a student at Albany Law School, Zaid was an intern of Stan Lundine, the lieutenant governor of New York.

== Practice ==
Zaid's practice is in litigation and lobbying on matters relating to national security, federal employment, foreign sovereign, and diplomatic immunity, international transactions, international torts and crimes, defamation, the Constitution (the First and Fifth Amendments), and the Freedom of Information/Privacy Acts (FOI/PA). He practices at Compass Rose Legal Group in Washington, D.C..

Through his practice, Zaid often represents former or current federal employees, intelligence officers, and whistleblowers who have grievances against agencies of the United States government or foreign governments. Additionally, he represents members of the media and the public in First Amendment and FOI/PA disputes. He has handled national security matters including security clearance revocations/denials, inspector general investigations, and other employment issues throughout the national security and military communities. He teaches the D.C. Bar CLE (continuing legal education) courses on FOIA and security clearances. He also teaches as an adjunct professor at Johns Hopkins University in Baltimore, Maryland. On 11 October 1994 he testified at a public hearing of the Assassination Records Review Board in Washington, DC.

Some of his cases are well known, such as suing Libya for the 1988 terrorist bombing of Pan Am Flight 103, which resulted in a $2.7 billion settlement, the largest of its kind against a foreign government for terrorist activities, and obtaining a court-ordered injunction in 2004 which effectively shut down the United States Department of Defense's mandatory anthrax vaccination program for two years.

Zaid has been quoted in print and online news reports as an expert in national security law and FOIA law. He has appeared as a commentator on CNN and MSNBC.

On September 8, 2016, Thomas J. Colbert, author of the book The Last Master Outlaw, and Mark Zaid filed a lawsuit to compel the Federal Bureau of Investigation to release its D.B. Cooper case file under the Freedom of Information Act. The suit alleges that the FBI suspended active investigation of the Cooper case "in order to undermine the theory that Rackstraw is D.B. Cooper so as to prevent embarrassment for the bureau's failure to develop evidence sufficient to prosecute him for the crime".

He was a member of the legal team, led by Andrew Bakaj, representing the whistleblower whose complaint against President Donald Trump sparked a major political scandal and led to the launching of an impeachment inquiry against the president. Zaid had been critical of Trump long before he began representing the whistleblower. He said the team is also working with a second whistleblower who has spoken with authorities, but had not filed a formal complaint as of October 6.

In February 2020, federal authorities indicted a Michigan man for threatening Zaid and his Ukraine whistleblower client by email in November 2019, purportedly saying, "All traitors must die miserable deaths." The man allegedly sent the message the day after President Trump, at a rally in Louisiana, held up a photo of Zaid and said, "From the lawyer, a sleazeball," before reading tweets from Zaid predicting that the president would not last out his first term. The man pleaded guilty in December 2020 and in June 2021 he was sentenced to twelve months and one day in prison, followed by three years of probation.

Citing his "'high profile' work," Zaid's malpractice carrier, Hanover Insurance Group in Worcester, Massachusetts dropped his coverage in 2020. The ABA Journal specifically cited as the reason the insurance company had "no appetite" for Zaid's work for the whistleblower whose report lead the first impeachment of Donald Trump. Both the speculation that Hanover had done it for that reason and the outrage against it, were widely reported. In August 2022, Zaid's firm took on former White House security advisor Olivia Troye's defense in a defamation lawsuit by former ambassador Richard Grenell. Zaid also filed a lawsuit on behalf of former Monkees band member Micky Dolenz against the FBI to obtain its file on the band from the 1960s for its public opposition to the controversial Vietnam War.

In November 2024, Zaid told Politico that he was advising some clients to temporarily leave the United States in an effort to avoid arrest as part of prosecution for what he claimed could be politically motivated prosecutions by the incoming Trump administration.

In February 2025, Donald Trump revoked Zaid's security clearance. That December, Zaid's request for a preliminary injunction against that revocation was accepted in federal court. In January 2026, Zaid reported that he could once again access classified information.

=== Whistleblower Aid ===
In September 2017, Zaid and former United States State Department whistleblower John Tye co-founded Whistleblower Aid, a legal organization which assists people in the government and the private sector to safely report lawbreaking. Initially focused on employees and contractors of the U.S. federal government, Whistleblower Aid emphasizes it is not WikiLeaks. "No one should ever send classified information to Whistleblower Aid," the firm said. "Whistleblower Aid will never assist clients or prospective clients with leaking classified information." Instead, would-be whistleblowers with classified information will be directed to investigators with security clearances to help expose wrongdoing without breaking the law or incurring criminal liability.

== See also ==
- United States v. Reynolds
