= The Last Master Outlaw =

2016 non-fiction book by Thomas J. Colbert and Tom Szollosi

- Author: Thomas J. Colbert & Tom Szollosi
- Publisher: Jacaranda Roots Publishing
- Publication date: 11 July 2016
- Pages: 328
- ISBN: 978-0-9977404-3-1
- Website: Official website

The Last Master Outlaw: How He Outfoxed the FBI Six Times—but Not a Cold Case Team is a 2016 non-fiction book written by Thomas J. Colbert and Tom Szollosi. It details the results of a five-year investigation of a suspect in the 1971 D. B. Cooper hijacking case. The book documents the life of Robert Rackstraw and the evidence compiled against him. It was also the basis of the 2016 History Channel documentary D.B. Cooper: Case Closed.

== Summary ==
The Last Master Outlaw details the results of a secret, five-year cold case investigation organized by Thomas J. Colbert, a former research chief at the Los Angeles CBS news station and a part-time police trainer. Colbert recruited 40 retired investigators, including a dozen FBI agents, and documented the trail of former Army pilot and ex-convict Robert Rackstraw, the suspect on whom the book primarily focuses, through at least 20 states and five countries while utilizing fake identities. The team also identified more than 100 pieces of new case evidence that allegedly point to Cooper being Rackstraw, including a 1970 Army ID picture that was later requested by the Bureau. A law enforcement expert who compared it to the FBI's 1971 hijacker sketch #2 claimed there are "nine points of match": ears, noses, brown eyes, short mouths, frown lines, chins, brows, odd head shapes and male-pattern baldness.

=== Robert Rackstraw ===
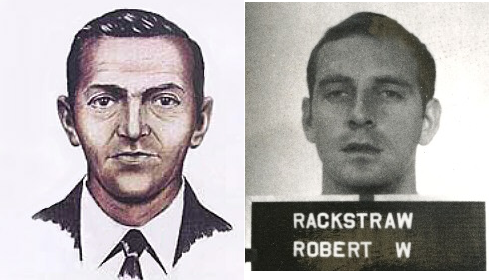
FBI sketch of D.B. Cooper from 1971 (left) compared to 1970 Army ID picture of Robert Rackstraw. Law enforcement expert found nine points of match between the two.

Robert Wesley "Bob" Rackstraw Sr. is a former Army pilot and ex-convict who earned multiple awards for "gallant" chopper rescues during the Vietnam War. Between flights, he received his commanders' wrath for "conduct unbecoming an officer" – during unauthorized ground missions with the CIA and Green Berets; for prohibited parachute jumps; and for lying about attending two universities. Those fabrications ended Rackstraw's seven-year career on June 21, 1971. After being discharged, his sister said the 27-year-old veteran came home to California both "disillusioned" and "angry" – five months before the D.B. Cooper skyjacking.

In the 1970s he was a dead-beat dad, four-time felon, escape artist and state prison convict. It was during two fugitive runs in 1978 that the FBI Cooper task force first became aware of Rackstraw. Both getaways involved planes: one was a flight to Iran, the other a faking of his own death in a mayday crash over Monterey Bay. Local police alerted the FBI to his resemblance to Cooper composite sketches, his military skill sets, and criminal record (aircraft theft, possession of explosives, check kiting and bank fraud). Special agents eliminated him as a hijack suspect in 1979 after no direct evidence of his involvement could be found.

In the 1980s and 90s, Rackstraw became a respected University of California, Riverside, law instructor and arbitration expert with three degrees.

== Reception and subsequent events ==
Prior to the release of the book and the week before all the circumstantial evidence from the investigation was to be presented to the FBI, the Seattle office canceled the long-planned meeting in April 2016. The Cooper case agent instead joined two bureau colleagues for a sit-down interview with History Channel, where they stated the 45-year-old file was being "administratively closed." This video statement was held for the show's July air date, where the FBI also added it would now only consider physical evidence, such as the parachute or more of the missing ransom cash.

On September 8, 2016, Thomas Colbert, along with attorney Mark Zaid, filed a federal lawsuit in Washington, DC, to compel the FBI and Department of Justice to reopen the Cooper case files under the Freedom of Information Act. The complaint alleges that the FBI suspended its active investigation of the Cooper case " ... in order to undermine the theory that Rackstraw is D.B. Cooper, so as to prevent embarrassment for the Bureau’s failure to develop evidence sufficient to prosecute him for the crime."

The FBI declined further comment. Rackstraw's lawyer, Dennis Roberts, denied his client was Cooper, calling all the renewed allegations "the stupidest thing I've ever heard." In a 2013 email to attorney Zaid, Roberts had noted "Bobby [Rackstraw] always enjoyed letting people think he is D.B. Cooper." Roberts' client confirmed the fact in a face-to-face meeting with Colbert the same year, stating, "I told everybody I was (the skyjacker)." And in a forgotten 1979 TV news interview, rediscovered in an archive, Rackstraw had "brazenly hinted" he was the daredevil: "I coulda' been. Coulda' been. Well, should it be fiction or should it be fact? That's primarily up to the American people someday, how that comes out."

Rackstraw died of heart disease on July 9, 2019. Prior to his death, he continued to deny being Cooper and revealed he had lost his boat repair business due to Colbert's claims.
