= Whistleblower Aid =

Nonprofit legal assistance organization to help whistleblowers

Values United
- Formation: Tax-exempt since March 2017; 9 years ago
- Type: 501(c)(3)
- Tax ID no.: EIN 264716045
- Headquarters: Washington, D.C.
- Revenue: 1,362,547 USD (2024)
- Expenses: 2,141,858 USD (2024)
- Website: whistlebloweraid.org

Whistleblower Aid is a nonprofit legal assistance organization co-founded by John Tye and Mark Zaid to help whistleblowers in government and the private sector. It provides free legal services as well as support and security services for eligible clients.

== History ==
In 2017, John N. Tye and attorney Mark S. Zaid formed the nonprofit law office Whistleblower Aid. Tye had previously worked from 2011 to 2014 as the section chief for Internet freedom in the Bureau of Democracy, Human Rights, and Labor in the US State Department, and was a whistleblower about government surveillance in the United States.

Initially focused on employees and contractors of the U.S. federal government, Whistleblower Aid emphasizes it is not WikiLeaks. "No one should ever send classified information to Whistleblower Aid," the firm states. "Whistleblower Aid will never assist clients or prospective clients with leaking classified information." Instead, would-be whistleblowers with classified information will be directed to investigators with security clearances to help expose wrongdoing without breaking the law or incurring criminal liability. Clients are not charged. To cover expenses, the firm solicits donations from foundations and crowd-source funding.

In 2020, it received a $150,000 grant from the Omidyar Network, the philanthropic investment firm founded by eBay founder Pierre Omidyar. Libby Liu became the chief executive officer in April 2021.

=== Frances Haugen ===
Starting in October 2021, Whistleblower Aid represented Frances Haugen in her whistleblower activities against Facebook. She contacted the organization shortly after downloading the thousands of internal files that she planned to leak.

To assist Haugen, Whistleblower Aid hired three law firms, a public relations firm, and temporary staff who are redacting documents for Congress. Haugen's flights to Washington, D.C. have been covered as well.

=== Joohn Choe ===
In December 2021 and February 2022, Whistleblower Aid filed complaints on behalf of Facebook contractor Joohn Choe. The complaints allege that Facebook parent company Meta willfully violated United States government sanctions on pro-Russian rebels, allowing them to spread propaganda on the platform.
