= Trinity Catholic High School (Connecticut) =

Private school in Stamford, Connecticut, United States

Location
- 926 Newfield Avenue; Stamford, Fairfield County, Connecticut 06905; United States; 41°5′31″N 73°32′4″W

Information
- Type: Private, Coeducational
- Religious affiliation: Roman Catholic
- Established: 1957
- Status: Closed
- Closed: 2020
- CEEB code: 070752
- Grades: 9–12
- Enrollment: 200
- Campus size: 26 acres (110,000 m^{2})
- Colors: Green and Gold
- Athletics conference: Fairfield County Interscholastic Athletic Conference
- Mascot: Crusader
- Team name: Crusaders
- Rival: Stamford High, Westhill
- Accreditation: New England Association of Schools and Colleges
- School fees: Dependent upon grade level
- Tuition: $14,360
- Alumni: SGMSC

Trinity Catholic High School was a regional, coeducational Catholic school for grades 9-12 located in Stamford, Connecticut. The school closed at the end of the 2019–2020 academic year. It served parts of Fairfield County, Connecticut and Westchester County, New York. The school was a member of the FCIAC athletic conference. Trinity Catholic was accredited by the New England Association of Schools and Colleges, Inc. and the Connecticut Department of Education. It is located in the Roman Catholic Diocese of Bridgeport.

The school is situated on a 26-acre (110,000 m^{2}) campus at 926 Newfield Avenue. The school had an initial capacity of approximately 1,200 students, however, due to cost concerns and the demand for smaller student to faculty ratios, has since reduced its enrollment in order to set itself apart from other schools. It was originally known as Stamford Catholic High School, but after other local Catholic Schools closed, was grouped with remaining students to create Trinity Catholic High School.

On February 27, 2020, the Most Reverend Frank J. Caggiano, Bishop of Bridgeport, announced that Trinity Catholic High School would not reopen its doors for the 2020–21 academic year due to enrollment and budget issues.

In 2020, the building was acquired by the Sisters of the Company of the Savior and became the PreK-12 Mater Salvatoris College Preparatory School, opening its doors for the 2021-2022 school year.

== Notable alumni ==
- Andrew P. Bakaj - Former Department of Defense and CIA official; lead counsel for the Whisteblower during the Impeachment Inquiry and the subsequent Impeachment of President Donald Trump.
- Dave Puzzuoli, former NFL player (graduated at the school when it was called Stamford Catholic High School)
- Dan Sileo, former NFL player (graduated at Stamford Catholic High School)

== See also ==
- Education in Stamford, Connecticut
