= Dave Puzzuoli =

American football player (born 1961)

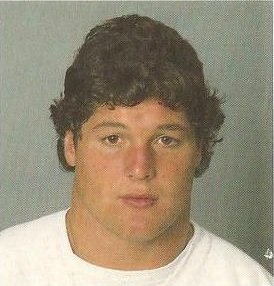

No. 72
- Position: Nose tackle

Personal information
- Born: January 12, 1961 (age 65); Stamford, Connecticut, U.S.
- Listed height: 6 ft 3 in (1.91 m)
- Listed weight: 260 lb (118 kg)

Career information
- High school: Stamford Catholic
- College: Pittsburgh
- NFL draft: 1983: 6th round, 149th overall pick

Career history
- Cleveland Browns (1983–1987); Indianapolis Colts (1989)*
- * Offseason or practice squad member only

Awards and highlights
- Second-team All-East (1982)

Career NFL statistics
- Sacks: 15.5
- Fumble recoveries: 2
- Stats at Pro Football Reference

Phillip David Puzzuoli (born January 12, 1961) is an American former professional football player who was a nose tackle in the National Football League (NFL). He played college football for the Pittsburgh Panthers.

== Early life ==
Puzzuoli played football at Stamford Catholic High School, graduating in 1979. He attended the University of Pittsburgh, where he played for the Panthers with quarterback Dan Marino.

== Professional career ==
Puzzuoli was selected in the sixth round (149th overall) by the Cleveland Browns in the 1983 NFL draft.

He played five seasons for the Cleveland Browns from 1983 to 1987. He played in every game except the three with "replacement players" during the 1987 strike. He provided a strong inside pass rush, his landmark moment being the sack of John Elway that temporarily derailed "The Drive" in the 1986 AFC Championship Game against the Denver Broncos.

He also was in the movie Masters of the Gridiron.
