= Open Technology Fund =

American nonprofit

- Abbreviation: OTF
- Formation: 2012; 14 years ago
- Type: 501(c)(3) organization
- Tax ID no.: 84-3126447
- Purpose: The support of Internet censorship circumvention and Internet privacy technologies
- Location: Washington, D.C.
- President: Laura Cunningham
- Parent organization: U.S. Agency for Global Media
- Affiliations: U.S. Government
- Budget: US$43.5 million
- Website: www.opentech.fund

The Open Technology Fund (OTF) is an American nonprofit corporation that aims to support global Internet freedom technologies. Its mission is to "support open technologies and communities that increase free expression, circumvent censorship, and obstruct repressive surveillance as a way to promote human rights and open societies." Until its formation as an independent entity, the Open Technology Fund had operated as a program of Radio Free Asia. As of November 2019, the Open Technology Fund became an independent nonprofit corporation and a grantee of the U.S. Agency for Global Media, which provides the majority of OTF's funding. On March 14, 2025, President Trump issued an executive order that directed that the U.S. Agency for Global Media be eliminated "to the maximum extent consistent with applicable law", along with several other agencies.

== History ==
The Open Technology Fund was started in 2012 by Libby Liu, then president of Radio Free Asia (RFA), as a pilot program within RFA to help better protect reporters and sources for the news organization with enhanced digital security technology. Under U.S. Secretary of State Hillary Clinton, the State Department adopted a policy of supporting global internet freedom initiatives. At this time, RFA began looking into technologies that helped their audiences avoid censorship and surveillance. Journalist Eli Lake argued that Clinton's policy was "heavily influenced by the Internet activism that helped organize the green revolution in Iran in 2009 and other revolutions in the Arab world in 2010 and 2011".

In September 2014, the OTF worked with Google and Dropbox to create an organization called Simply Secure to help improve the usability of privacy tools.

In March 2017, the OTF's future was reported as under question due to the Trump administration's unclear positions on Internet freedom issues. However, the OTF continued to receive Congressional funding under the Trump administration.

In November 2019, OTF announced it had become an independent nonprofit corporation. The OTF has funded digital privacy and security technology, including The Tor Project, Signal, and other encryption projects.

In June 2020, Libby Liu resigned as CEO of OTF (see § Dispute over board).

On March 14, 2025, President Donald Trump issued an executive order directing federal agencies to reduce their functions "to the maximum extent consistent with applicable law," including the U.S. Agency for Global Media (USAGM), which disburses congressionally approved funding to OTF. The following day, USAGM senior advisor Kari Lake announced the termination of the OTF's federal grant, stating that the "award no longer effectuates agency priorities."

In response, OTF filed suit against USAGM seeking the release of congressionally appropriated funds. In its court filings, OTF argued that the termination would prevent an estimated 45 million users living under authoritarian regimes from accessing tools that enable uncensored access to the Internet and secure communications. The organization further claimed that, as the largest funder in the space, "the vast majority of internet freedom technology projects anywhere in the world will cease and the internet freedom technology field as whole will be largely decimated."

The decision drew bipartisan concern from members of Congress who described OTF's work as vital to U.S. foreign policy priorities and Internet openness. Although Lake later stated that she had withdrawn the letter rescinding OTF's funding, USAGM reportedly was sending payments after April 3. In June, a federal judge ordered USAGM to release OTF's fiscal year 2024 funds. In late October, OTF petitioned the court to compel the agency to disburse overdue fiscal year 2025 funding.

== Organization and funding ==
Initial funding was allocated in 2011 from Congress to the Broadcasting Board of Governors, which then provided $7 million to Radio Free Asia. The Open Technology Fund operated for seven years as a program of Radio Free Asia, a U.S. government-funded, nonprofit international corporation that provides news, information and commentary in East Asia. Since 2019, the OTF has had its own Board of Directors and receives its funding directly from the U.S. Agency for Global Media (USAGM), an independent agency of the U.S. government. The OTF is sustained by annual grants from the USAGM, which originate from yearly U.S. Congressional appropriations for State, Foreign Operations, and Related Programs. According to the OTF, it works with other publicly funded programs to fulfill a U.S. Congressional mandate to sustain and increase global freedom of information on the Internet with public funds.

== Projects ==
The OTF funds third-party audits for all the code-related projects it supports. It has also offered to fund audits of "non-OTF supported projects that are in use by individuals and organizations under threat of censorship/surveillance". Notable projects whose audits the OTF has sponsored include Cryptocat, Commotion Wireless, TextSecure, GlobaLeaks, MediaWiki, OpenPGP.js, Nitrokey, Ricochet and Signal. The OTF also matched donations to the auditing of TrueCrypt. In 2014, the OTF reported that it had funded more than 30 technology code audits over the past three years, identifying 185 privacy and security vulnerabilities in both OTF and non-OTF-funded projects.

In 2015, The Tor Project announced that OTF would sponsor a bug bounty program coordinated by HackerOne. The program was initially invite-only and focuses on finding vulnerabilities that are specific to The Tor Project's applications.

In October 2019, OTF Technology Director Sarah Aoun discussed the findings of OTF-funded research into a Chinese government mobile application, telling ABC News that the app essentially amounts to a "surveillance device in your pocket." "The access itself is significant", OTF Research Director Adam Lynn told The Washington Post. "The fact that they've gone to these lengths [to hide it] only further heightens the scrutiny around this."

According to its funding agency, the U.S. Agency for Global Media, OTF's impact by 2019 was global, with over 2 billion people using OTF-supported technology daily, and more than two-thirds of all mobile users having OTF-incubated technology on their devices. "As authoritarian states worldwide increasingly attempt to control what their citizens read, write, and even share online," said OTF CEO Libby Liu, "this next stage in OTF's growth could not come at a more crucial time."

OTF had $2 million of funding from the USAGM to assist with the 2019–20 Hong Kong protests, but this funding was frozen by USAGM CEO Michael Pack in June 2020 as China was preparing to introduce a new national security law for Hong Kong.

== Dispute over board ==
On June 17, 2020, the newly appointed head of USAGM, Michael Pack, fired the board of OTF and CEO Libby Liu. Liu had already tendered her resignation on June 13, 2020, effective July 13, 2020, on a separate issue regarding the usage of closed-source software. The new board was named, consisting of Jonathan Alexandre (Senior Counsel, Liberty Counsel Action), Robert Bowes (Senior Advisor to the Secretary, U.S. Department of Housing and Urban Development), Bethany Kozma (Deputy Chief of Staff, United States Agency for International Development), Rachel Semmel (Communications Director, Office of Management and Budget), Emily Newman (Chief of Staff, USAGM), and Pack as chairman. The next day, the board fired president Laura Cunningham.

On June 23, 2020, District of Columbia attorney general Karl A. Racine filed suit under the District's Nonprofit Corporations Act to reverse Pack's replacement of the OTF board. The lawsuit alleged that the actions violated the "firewall" clause in federal communications regulations that shield government news agencies from political interference.

On July 21, 2020, the U.S. Court of Appeals for the District of Columbia blocked the findings in an emergency stay, warning that these actions could endanger the work of activists against Internet censorship in countries with repressive government. On October 16, 2020, in a separate case, the DC Superior Court ruled that the changes were unlawful, reinstated the previous board, and ruled that any changes the new board made were invalid.

Beginning in August 2020, OTF came under increasing pressure from Pack and USAGM leadership. According to Axios, this was related to OTF's reluctance to extend grants to Falun Gong-related enterprises working on technology directed against China's Great Firewall; the New York Times noted Falun Gong and its Epoch Times media group often supported the Trump administration. On August 18, USAGM announced it was setting up its own Office of Internet Freedom with less strict grant requirements and began soliciting OTF's grantees to apply to the new office. On August 20, OTF sued USAGM in the U.S. Court for Federal Claims for withholding nearly $20 million in previously agreed grants.

On October 15, summary judgment was granted nullifying Pack's attempt to replace the OTF board.

In June 2020, OTF had asked law firm McGuireWoods, which had been advising it pro bono, for help in its conflict with the USAGM and Pack. McGuireWoods said it could not help in the case. OTF learned in December 2020 that the reason was that McGuireWoods had decided to investigate OTF on behalf of USAGM and Pack instead. The Government Accountability Project, citing records obtained via the Freedom of Information Act, claimed McGuireWoods had billed USAGM $1.625 million at an average rate of $320 an hour after receiving a no-bid contract to investigate OTF as well as Voice of America employees.

== See also ==
- Freedom of the Press Foundation – a non-governmental organization that has also supported some of the same projects that the OTF has supported
- Mass surveillance – the intricate surveillance of an entire or a substantial fraction of a population in order to monitor that group of citizens
- NetFreedom Task Force – an initiative within the U.S. Department of State that was established in February 2006
