= Libby Liu =

American nonprofit executive, lawyer, and privacy advocate

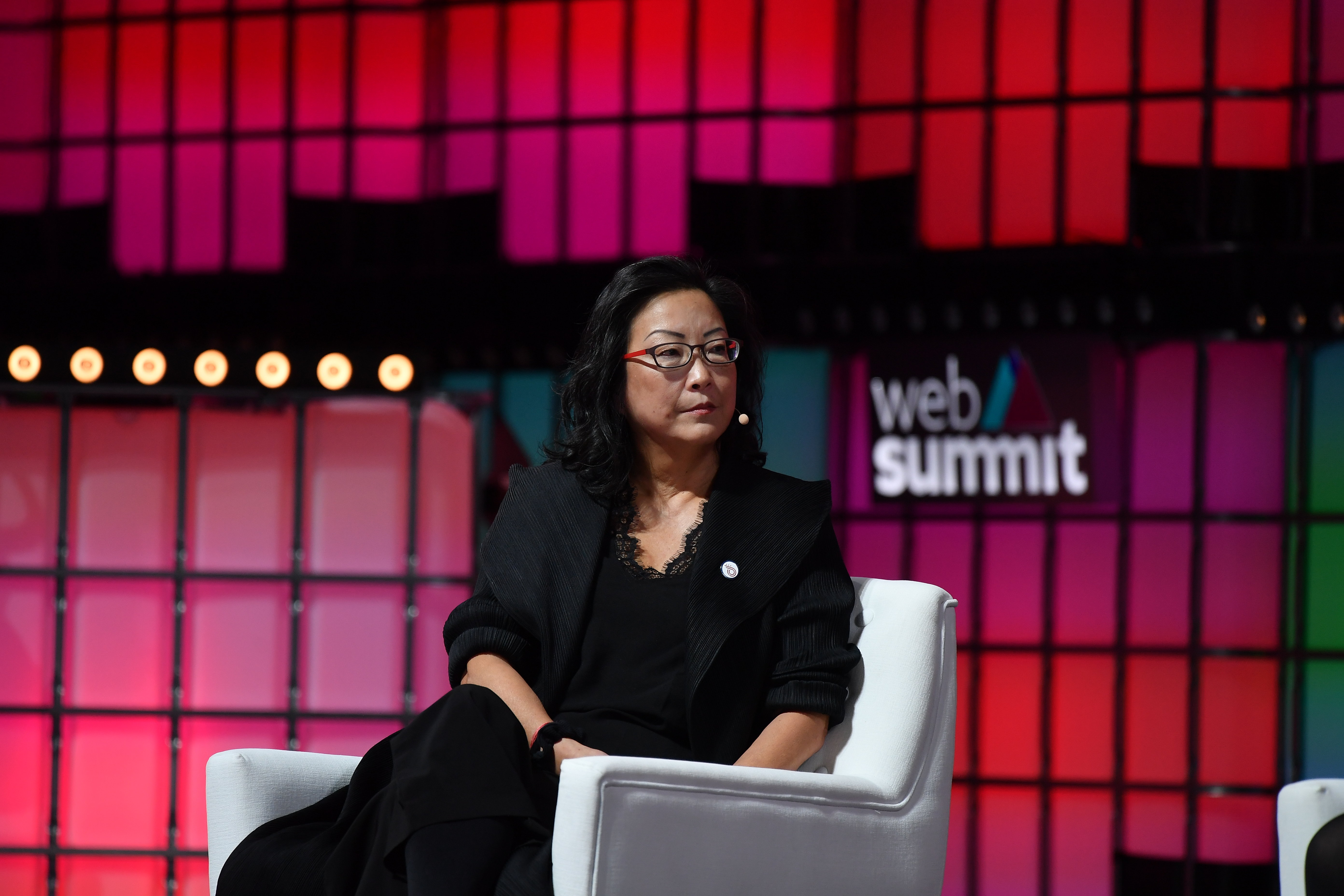
Libby Liu

Libby Liu is an American nonprofit executive, lawyer, and privacy advocate who is the chief executive officer of Whistleblower Aid. She was the president of Radio Free Asia for 14 years, where she led the founding of the Open Technology Fund. After the OTF became an independent organization in 2019, she was the chief executive officer until June 2020.

== Early life and education ==
Liu was born in California to parents who had emigrated from China. She completed a bachelor's degree at University of California-Berkeley, an MBA at the Wharton School of the University of Pennsylvania, and a JD at University of Pennsylvania Law School.

== Career ==
At Radio Free Asia, Liu began as the Vice-President for Administration and Finance, and in September 2005, she was appointed president of the organization. She had previously worked as the Director of Administration and Strategic Planning for the NAACP in Baltimore and had been a director of human resources and employment counsel at a technology company.

As president of Radio Free Asia, Liu worked to support efforts to circumvent Chinese government censorship, including the development of digital technology to evade Chinese government internet firewalls. In 2012, Liu began the Open Technology Fund (OTF) with a team within Radio Free Asia, which was supported by funding from the U.S. Agency for Global Media (USAGM). In 2019, the OTF became an independent non-profit organization and grantee of the USAGM, and Liu became the chief executive officer. The OTF funds digital privacy and security technology, including The Tor Project, Signal, and other encryption projects.

In June 2020, Liu offered her resignation from OTF after Michael Pack was appointed to lead the USAGM. The OTF board accepted with a month delay in her leaving the organization, and then Pack fired her and several heads of USAGM-funded news outlets. OTF filed a lawsuit against Pack in federal court and the federal court ruled Pack was within his legal authority to fire Liu and other heads of news outlets overseen by the USAGM. Liu also filed a whistleblower complaint in September 2020. The District of Columbia attorney general also sued Pack for alleged violations of nonprofit law in D.C. Superior Court based on firings that included Liu, the OTF president, and the OTF board, and the D.C. Superior Court ruled the firings by Pack were unlawful.

Liu became the chief executive officer of Whistleblower Aid in April 2021. During her tenure, the organization has represented Facebook whistleblower Frances Haugen and other former Facebook employees.

== Honors and awards ==
- 2020/2021 Luxembourg Peace Prize for Outstanding Peace Technology
- "Washington DC's 500 Most Influential People of 2023", Washingtonian
