= David B. Buckley =

American government official

David Brent Buckley
- Born: 1957 (age 68–69)
- Occupation: American government official

David Brent Buckley (born 1957) is an American government official. He worked in the Office of Special Investigations for the U.S. General Accounting Office, the Department of the Treasury for Tax Administration, the Department of Defense, the U.S. Senate Permanent Subcommittee on Investigations, the House Permanent Select Committee on Intelligence, and Deloitte Consulting, and served as Inspector General of the Central Intelligence Agency from 2010 to 2015. He later served as staff director of the United States House Select Committee on the January 6 Attack from 2021 to 2023.

In January 2025, Buckley's security clearance was revoked by executive order after he signed an October 2020 letter, along with 50 other former intelligence officials, stating that reporting on Hunter Biden's laptop had "all the classic earmarks of a Russian information operation."

== Early career ==
Buckley earned a Bachelor of Science from the University of Maryland University College.

He worked in the Office of Special Investigations for the U.S. General Accounting Office. He also held investigative and leadership roles within the Inspector General offices of the Department of the Treasury for Tax Administration and the Department of Defense.

Buckley served as chief investigator for the U.S. Senate Permanent Subcommittee on Investigations. From 2005 to 2007, he served as minority staff director of the House Permanent Select Committee on Intelligence. He then worked as a senior manager at Deloitte Consulting from 2007 until his nomination as CIA Inspector General.

== CIA Inspector General ==
President Barack Obama nominated Buckley to serve as Inspector General of the Central Intelligence Agency in 2010. The position had been vacant since the retirement of John L. Helgerson in March 2009. The Senate Intelligence Committee held Buckley's confirmation hearing on September 21, 2010. He served as Inspector General from October 2010 to January 2015.

In July 2014, Buckley's office completed an investigation into whether CIA employees had improperly accessed a computer network used by Senate Intelligence Committee staff who were preparing a report on the CIA's detention and interrogation program.

Following the report, CIA Director John Brennan apologized to Senator Dianne Feinstein, the committee's chairwoman, and Senator Saxby Chambliss, the vice chairman.

=== Whistleblower retaliation finding ===
In June 2019, the Inspector General of the Department of Homeland Security completed a 36-page report finding that Buckley had retaliated against Andrew Bakaj, a special agent in the CIA Inspector General's office.

According to the report, Bakaj had cooperated with an investigation by the Intelligence Community Inspector General in 2014. The DHS Inspector General's investigation "substantiated" allegations that Buckley subsequently opened an investigation into Bakaj that the report characterized as "retaliatory." That investigation led to the discovery of separate information that was used to suspend Bakaj's security clearance and place him on administrative leave. The report recommended that the CIA review Buckley's security clearance.

Buckley had left the CIA by the time the report was completed and declined to be interviewed for the investigation. A spokesperson for the January 6 committee stated that Buckley had disclosed the matter during his interview process and denied the allegations, saying that "in his role as CIA Inspector General, Mr. Buckley had no choice but to place the complainant on administrative leave after the CIA's Office of Security suspended the employee's clearance."

== Post-CIA career ==
In March 2015, Buckley joined KPMG as a managing director to lead the firm's Federal Forensic practice.

=== Hunter Biden laptop letter ===
On October 19, 2020, Buckley was among 51 former intelligence officials who signed a public letter stating that the release of emails from Hunter Biden's laptop had "all the classic earmarks of a Russian information operation." The letter stated that the signatories did "not have evidence of Russian involvement."

A June 2024 report by the House Judiciary Committee and House Intelligence Committee stated that Buckley was an active CIA contractor at the time he signed the letter.

=== January 6 committee ===
In July 2021, Buckley was appointed staff director of the January 6th Committee. The appointment drew criticism from whistleblower advocacy groups due to the DHS Inspector General's findings regarding his treatment of Bakaj.

The Project On Government Oversight called for Buckley's removal, stating that "hiring an individual who has retaliated against a whistleblower in the past—and placing him in such a prominent position—sends a chilling message to potential witnesses." Buckley remained in the position until the committee concluded its work in January 2023.

== Security clearance revocation ==
On January 20, 2025, President Donald Trump signed an executive order revoking the security clearances of Buckley and the other surviving signatories of the October 2020 letter regarding Hunter Biden's laptop. The executive order accused the signatories of having "willfully weaponized the gravitas of the Intelligence Community to manipulate the political process."
