= Ciarán Devane =

Irish executive

Sir Ciarán Devane FRSA
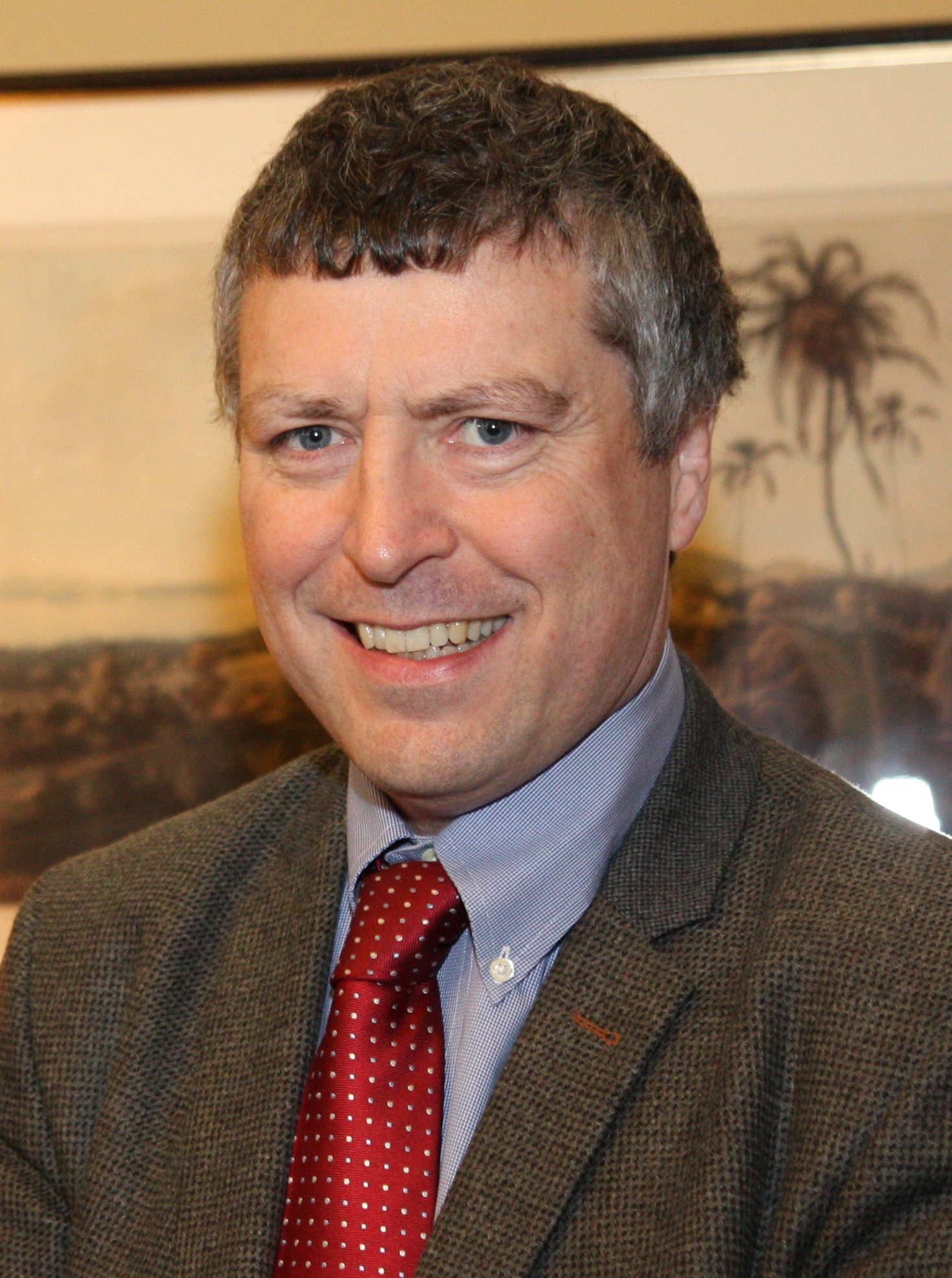

Executive Director of the Centre for Trust, Peace and Social Relations
- Incumbent
- Assumed office April 2021

Personal details
- Born: Ciarán Gearoid Devane; 25 October 1962 (age 64) Dublin, Ireland

Sir Ciarán Gearoid Devane (born 25 October 1962) is the executive director of the Centre for Trust, Peace and Social Relations (CTPSR) and associate pro-vice-chancellor for international relations at Coventry University (appointed April 2021). Previously he was chief executive of the British Council (appointed January 2015). He is also chairperson of the Health Service Executive.

== Education ==
Devane was educated at University College Dublin, where he read for a BEng in biochemical engineering. He also holds a master's degree in international policy and practice from the George Washington University's Elliott School of International Affairs.

== Career ==
Devane worked as chief executive at Macmillan Cancer Support from 2007 to 2014. He was appointed chief executive of the British Council in January 2015. As of 2015, Devane was paid a salary of between £185,000 and £189,999 by the Foreign Office, making him one of the 328 most highly paid people in the British public sector at that time. He also serves as a non-executive director of NHS England. Devane was appointed to Coventry University in April 2021.

Devane was knighted in the 2015 Birthday Honours for services to cancer patients.

Devane was announced as the first chairperson of the new board of the Irish health service, the Health Service Executive (HSE) by Minister for Health, Simon Harris on 18 September 2018.

In January 2026 Devane was announced as the inaugural Chief Executive of The NHS Alliance, the organisation formed following the merger of NHS Providers and The NHS Confederation.

== Arms ==
Coat of arms of Ciarán Devane
Notes Granted 4 March 2021 Crest A demi Elk Gules holding between the forelegs an Owl Or. Mantled Vert doubled Or. Torse Or and Vert Escutcheon Per fess enarched Azure and Vert in chief issuant from the flanks a pair of dexter forearms fesswise the hands clasped that to the dexter Argent that to the sinister Or in base three piles reversed throughout Or. Motto Ar Scáth A Chélle Badge A pair of cubit arms fesswise the hands clasped that to the dexter Argent that to the sinister Or within and issuant from a chaplet of honeysuckle flowers slipped and leaved Proper.

== See also ==
- British Council
- Macmillan Cancer Support
