= John Tye (whistleblower) =

American lawyer and whistleblower

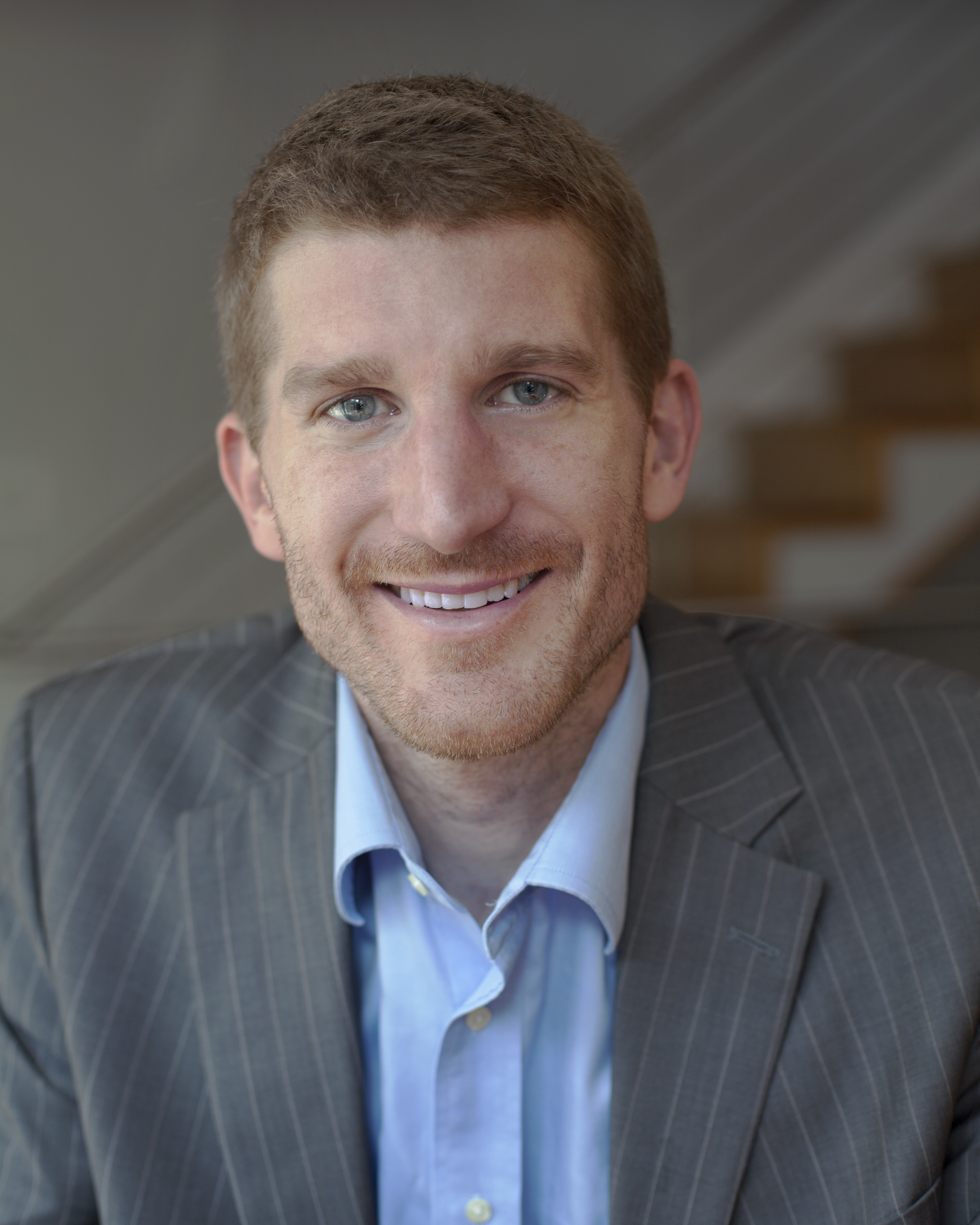

Personal details
- Born: John Napier Tye; 1975 or 1976 (age 49–50) Boston, Massachusetts, U.S.
- Education: Duke University (BS); Lincoln College, Oxford (BA); Yale University (JD)

John Napier Tye (born c. 1976) is a former official of the U.S. State Department who came forward in 2014 as a whistleblower seeking to publicize certain electronic surveillance practices of the U.S. government under Executive Order 12333. He later co-founded a legal organization, Whistleblower Aid, intended to help whistleblowers in multiple sectors forward their concerns without incurring legal liability.

== Biography ==
John Tye was raised in a suburb of Boston. He attended Duke University, where he earned a B.S. in Adaptive and Intelligent Systems, a major of his own creation. Said Tye of his undergraduate career, "I thought I was going to be a scientist. But when I was graduating, I decided I wanted to do things that have more of an impact on real people."

Tye then attended Lincoln College, Oxford as a Rhodes Scholar. There, he studied philosophy, politics, and economics. After studying at Oxford, he did research on hate groups for the Southern Poverty Law Center. He then earned a J.D. at Yale Law, where he joined a civil liberties litigation clinic. After graduating Yale in 2006, Tye moved to New Orleans, where he worked on housing issues for low-income families. He co-authored a May 2010 study on reform of the U.S. housing finance system, described as "essential reading" by real estate blogger Jonathan Miller, and co-authored the introductory chapter of the 2011 book The American Mortgage System: Crisis and Reform.

In January 2011, Tye was recruited to the State Department by his former Yale instructor Michael Posner, then Assistant Secretary of State. He served in the State Department until April 2014, as section chief for Internet freedom in the State Department’s Bureau of Democracy, Human Rights, and Labor, where he was cleared to access Top Secret and Sensitive Compartmented Information. In his official role, Tye sometimes traveled abroad and advocated for an open Internet, free of government surveillance.

From 2014 to 2015, Tye was legal director and campaign director of Avaaz, a global civic activist organization.

== Whistleblowing ==
=== Internal channels ===
In Fall 2013 and February 2014, Tye attended two classified National Security Agency briefings on Executive Order 12333, which was signed by President Ronald Reagan and amended by President George W. Bush. Tye attended these briefings so that he could help prepare the State Department's response to the high-profile leaks disclosed by NSA whistleblower Edward Snowden. In March 2013, Snowden had specifically asked his former colleagues at NSA whether EO 12333 could override existing statutes, a fact confirmed by his lawyer Jesselyn Radack. Radack's other clients, Thomas Drake and William Binney had also raised concerns about EO 12333 through internal channels prior to 2010.

Following a January 17, 2014 speech by President Barack Obama on NSA surveillance reforms that failed to mention changes to activities under E.O. 12333, Tye began to use internal channels at the State Department to press his concerns over the order. Prior to leaving the State Department in April 2014, Tye filed a complaint with the Department's inspector general, asserting that the intelligence collection and retention policies being carried out under E.O. 12333 violated the Fourth Amendment to the United States Constitution.

Tye also met with staffers of the House and Senate Intelligence committees, and communicated his complaint to the inspector general of the NSA. The House Intelligence committee responded in a letter to Tye that it "reviewed your allegations and has taken the action it deems appropriate in this matter."

=== Public disclosure ===
On July 18, 2014, The Washington Post published an editorial written by Tye highlighting his concerns over U.S. signals intelligence activities performed under E.O. 12333. Comparing this executive order to the much-discussed Section 215 of the Patriot Act, Tye wrote, "I believe that Americans should be even more concerned about the collection and storage of their communications under Executive Order 12333 than under Section 215." E.O. 12333, Tye wrote, allows for the collection of both metadata and communication contents of U.S. persons, so long as the collection takes place outside the U.S. However, Tye argued, many communications between U.S. persons may transit or be stored on servers outside the U.S., making them vulnerable to collection under E.O. 12333. Although U.S. persons cannot be directly "targeted" under the order, their communications can be gathered "incidentally" in the course of investigating a foreign target. Tye argued that under the government's interpretation of Order 12333, "incidental collection" could include the data of every person using popular internet services—including Gmail, Yahoo, and Dropbox—amounting to, in theory, "billions of people".

As an executive order rather than a statute, Tye noted, E.O. 12333 had never been subject to congressional or judicial oversight. Collection under the order does not require a warrant and need not be reported to Congress. The president's Review Group on Intelligence and Communication Technologies had recommended reform to collection policies under Order 12333, yet the White House had indicated it would not enact this recommendation.

On July 23, 2014, Tye spoke at a public meeting of the Privacy and Civil Liberties Oversight Board, an independent agency within the executive branch tasked with advising the president on matters of privacy and civil liberties.

In November 2014, Tye spoke about his experience at the TEDx Charlottesville conference.

Tye maintains that he has not, and will not, release any classified information. Prior to publication, he submitted his Post editorial for approval by the State Department and the NSA, which both deemed that no changes were necessary. In addition, Tye has insisted on having a third party present when speaking to reporters to counter any later claim that he revealed classified information.

=== Reactions ===
On August 19, Alexander Joel, Civil Liberties Protection Officer of the Office of the Director of National Intelligence, responded directly to Tye's Post editorial. Joel emphasized that Americans cannot be directly targeted under Executive Order 12333, and that use and retention of the collected data is limited by policies approved by the U.S. Attorney General. Notably, under these policies, data cannot be retained for more than five years. Tye responded that arguments about targeting and limits on use ignored more important questions of whose data is actually collected, and how that data is retained.

In responding to Tye's allegations, NSA spokeswoman Vanee Vines said, "Whether NSA's activities are conducted under EO 12333 or the Foreign Intelligence Surveillance Act, NSA applies Attorney General-approved processes to protect the privacy of U.S. persons in the collection, retention, and use of foreign intelligence."

Ben Wizner, lead attorney for NSA leaker Edward Snowden, called Tye's actions "entirely admirable," noting that not every whistleblower could be expected to take on the personal risks that Snowden did by revealing classified information. Tye's own attorney, Mark Zaid, a critic of Snowden, acknowledged that Snowden's disclosures had likely made it easier for Tye to come forward with his own revelation.

Legal experts debated the potential impact of Tye's disclosure on the possibility of reform of practices under E.O. 12333, with Indiana University law professor Fred Cate arguing that such a disclosure within the rules of the government's classification system may not have the impact of a leak of classified documents. Mark Jaycox of the Electronic Frontier Foundation argued that Tye's disclosure would help to push forward the reform process.

Tye was named one of 2014's "National Security Law Heroes" by Steve Vladeck of the blog Just Security.

== Whistleblower Aid ==
In September 2017, Tye and lawyer Mark Zaid founded Whistleblower Aid, a legal organization intended to help whistleblowers across multiple sectors safely disclose wrongdoing. Initially focused on employees and contractors of the U.S. federal government, Whistleblower Aid emphasizes it is different from WikiLeaks: "No one should ever send classified information to Whistleblower Aid," the firm states. "Whistleblower Aid will never assist clients or prospective clients with leaking classified information." Instead, would-be whistleblowers with classified information will be directed to investigators with security clearances to help expose wrongdoing without breaking the law or incurring criminal liability. "We are trying to hold the U.S. government accountable," Zaid explained, "and provide free legal services to whistleblowers so they don't ruin their careers in the process or be prosecuted." Clients will not be charged. To cover expenses, the firm solicits donations from foundations and crowdsourced funding. In 2021, Tye and Whistleblower Aid represented Frances Haugen for her whistleblower activities against Facebook.

== See also ==
- Global surveillance disclosures (2013–present)
- The full text of Executive Order 12333 at Wikisource
