= Philip S. Smith =

American entrepreneur

- Education: Centre College, George Washington University
- Occupation: Entrepreneur

Philip S. Smith is an American entrepreneur who has served on the Republican National Committee and the National Republican Senatorial Committee. He founded the fundraising organization CAPTEL.

== Career ==
Smith earned his B.A. at Centre College. His graduate studies at George Washington University's Elliott School of International Affairs.

Smith served as executive director of the finance committee for the Republican National Committee (RNC) from 1981 until 1985. In 1987, he was reappointed director of finance for the RNC. He later became finance director at National Republican Senatorial Committee. Smith aided in directing the fundraising efforts of the Republican National Committee in 1988. He became Vice President of Public Affairs for Dole Food Company in 1989. Smith founded an investment and consulting firm in 1992 which was based in Washington. In 1997, he founded and became CEO of National Capital Teleservices (CAPTEL). Captel is a PAC fundraising company for political institutions and non-profit organizations. Smith served a four-year term as a Trustee of the Chesapeake Bay Trust from 2004 until 2007.

Smith served on the board of the Citizen's Research Foundation of the University of Southern California. He has also served on the board for the American Red Cross, Boys and Girls Clubs of America, White House Fellows Selection Committee, and Ocean Race Chesapeake and the Chesapeake Bay Trust.
