= USS Decatur (DDG-73) =

United States Navy guided-missile destroyer

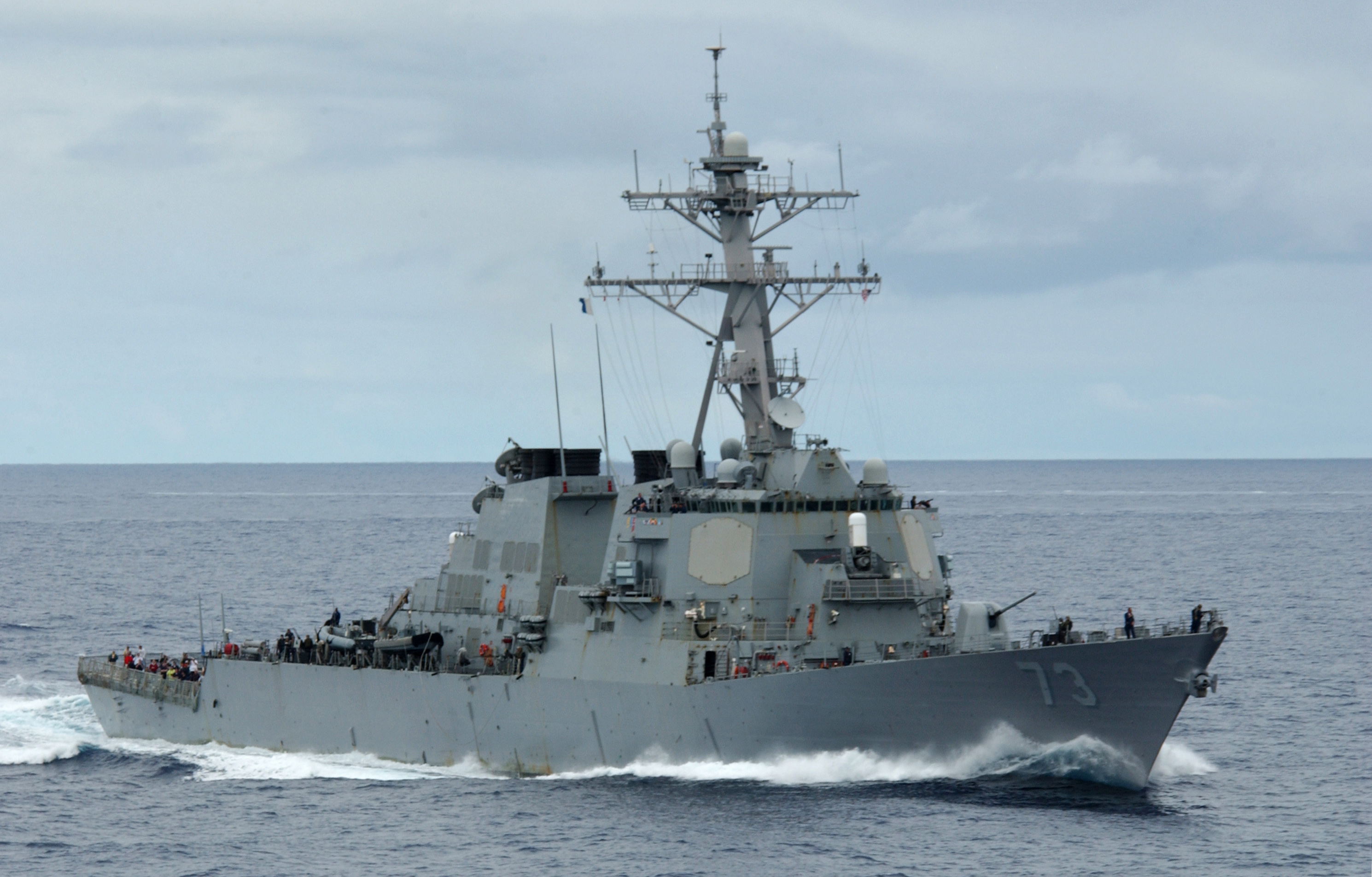
- USS Decatur on 3 July 2006

History

United States
- Name: Decatur
- Namesake: Stephen Decatur
- Ordered: 19 January 1993
- Builder: Bath Iron Works
- Laid down: 11 January 1996
- Launched: 8 November 1996
- Commissioned: 29 August 1998
- Home port: Naval Base Pearl Harbor
- Identification: MMSI number: 368897000; Callsign: NDEC; Hull number: DDG-73
- Motto: In Pursuit of Peace
- Status: in active service
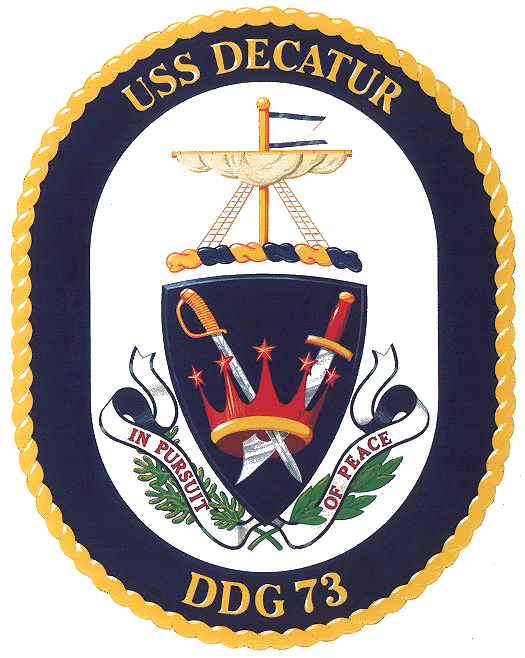
- Badge

General characteristics
- Class & type: Arleigh Burke-class destroyer
- Displacement: 8,637 long tons (8,776 t) (Full load)
- Length: 505 ft (154 m)
- Beam: 59 ft (18 m)
- Draft: 31 ft (9.4 m)
- Installed power: 4 × General Electric LM2500-30 gas turbines; 100,000 shp (75,000 kW)
- Propulsion: 2 × shafts
- Speed: In excess of 30 kn (56 km/h; 35 mph)
- Range: 4,400 nmi (8,100 km; 5,100 mi) at 20 kn (37 km/h; 23 mph)
- Complement: 33 commissioned officers; 38 chief petty officers; 210 enlisted personnel
- Sensors & processing systems: AN/SPY-1D PESA 3D radar (Flight I, II, IIA); AN/SPY-6(V)1 AESA 3D radar (Flight III); AN/SPS-67(V)3 or (V)5 surface search radar (DDG-51 – DDG-118); AN/SPQ-9B surface search radar (DDG-119 onward); AN/SPS-73(V)12 surface search/navigation radar (DDG-51 – DDG-86); BridgeMaster E surface search/navigation radar (DDG-87 onward); 3 × AN/SPG-62 fire-control radar; Mk 46 optical sight system (Flight I, II, IIA); Mk 20 electro-optical sight system (Flight III); AN/SQQ-89 ASW combat system: AN/SQS-53C sonar array; AN/SQR-19 tactical towed array sonar (Flight I, II, IIA); TB-37U multi-function towed array sonar (DDG-113 onward); AN/SQQ-28 LAMPS III shipboard system
- Electronic warfare & decoys: AN/SLQ-32 electronic warfare suite; AN/SLQ-25 Nixie torpedo countermeasures; Mk 36 Mod 12 decoy launching systems; Mk 53 Nulka decoy launching systems; Mk 59 decoy launching systems
- Armament: Guns: 1 × 5-inch (127 mm)/54 mk 45 mod 1/2 (lightweight gun); 2 × 20 mm (0.8 in) Phalanx CIWS; 2 × 25 mm (0.98 in) Mk 38 machine gun system; 4 × 0.50 inches (12.7 mm) caliber guns; Missiles: 2 × Mk 141 Harpoon anti-ship missile launcher; 1 × 29-cell, 1 × 61-cell (90 total cells) Mk 41 vertical launching system (VLS): RIM-66M surface-to-air missile; RIM-156 surface-to-air missile; RIM-161 anti-ballistic missile; BGM-109 Tomahawk cruise missile; RUM-139 vertical launch ASROC; Torpedoes: 2 × Mark 32 triple torpedo tubes: Mark 46 lightweight torpedo; Mark 50 lightweight torpedo; Mark 54 lightweight torpedo
- Aircraft carried: 1 × Sikorsky MH-60R

USS Decatur (DDG-73) is an Arleigh Burke-class (Flight II) Aegis guided missile destroyer in the United States Navy. She is named for the former naval officer Stephen Decatur, Jr. This ship is the 22nd destroyer of her class. USS Decatur was the 13th ship of this class to be built at Bath Iron Works in Bath, Maine, and construction began on 11 January 1996. She was launched on 10 November 1996 and was christened on 8 November 1996. On 29 August 1998 she was commissioned at the Tom McCall Waterfront Park in Portland, Oregon.

== History ==
Tour of an officer's stateroom aboard Decatur in 2023

Decatur was commissioned on 19 June 1998 in Bath, Maine, with the official ceremony taking place 29 August 1998, at the Tom McCall Waterfront Park in Portland, Oregon. The guided missile destroyer arrived at her new home port of San Diego 4 September 1998. She spent the remainder of the year conducting acoustic trials and combat system evaluations. Decatur then spent three months in a post-shakedown availability in the Southwest Marine Yard.

In April 1999, the warship conducted a short cruise to the Northwest, visiting Decatur Island, Washington, and Vancouver, Canada, before returning to San Diego in early May. After a second visit to Washington in August, Decatur sent a boarding team of Damage Control Experts to assist MV Gardenia Ace—a car carrier—which had suffered a fire in her engine room.

Upon completion of her final missile tests and sea trials, Decatur commenced her first western Pacific deployment on 7 January 2000. After stopping at Pearl Harbor to load Tomahawk land-attack missiles, the guided missile destroyer proceeded to the Yellow Sea for Exercise Sharem 2000—a joint U.S. and South Korean naval exercise—in late January. On 30 January, the warship visited Chinhae, South Korea, and over the next two weeks also stopped at Yokosuka and Nagasaki, Japan. She then sailed south through the Taiwan Strait, made a three-day port visit to Hong Kong, and then commenced a South China Sea exercise with units of the Philippine Navy.

In February 2001, Decatur began various battle group and missile training off the West Coast. Following the terrorist plane hijackings and crashes in New York, Washington and Pennsylvania on 11 September, the destroyer put to sea for Operation Noble Eagle off the coast of the San Francisco Bay Area. Returning to San Diego on 23 September, the warship spent seven weeks preparing for her deployment with the John C. Stennis battle group on 12 November. Between 17 December 2001 and 16 April 2002, Decatur escorted the Peleliu Amphibious Ready Group during which time her security team boarded three merchant ships, including one non-compliant boarding of MV Francisco Dagohoy on 10 April—in support of Maritime Interdiction Operations. Decatur returned to San Diego on 8 June 2002.

Decatur departed on her third deployment overall, and second deployment to the Persian Gulf, in August 2003. She made stops in Pearl Harbor and Singapore before arriving in the Persian Gulf. In December, Decatur seized a 40-foot (12 m) dhow on 15 December, discovering an estimated two tons of narcotics allegedly linked to an al-Qaeda smuggling operation. The drugs had an estimated street value of 8 to 10 million dollars.

In May 2004, Decatur entered dry-dock, her first dry-dock period since construction.

In January 2006, Decatur departed for her fourth deployment (third to the Persian Gulf) as part of a Carrier Strike Group, led by the aircraft carrier Ronald Reagan. Throughout the deployment, she conducted Maritime Security Operations in the Arabian Sea and Persian Gulf; participated in three major anti-submarine warfare exercises (including Arabian Shark and Valiant Shield); and as part of the French-led Task Force 473, conducted Arabian Sea operations with the Charles de Gaulle.

On 16 February 2007, Decatur was awarded the 2006 Battle "E" award. In June, Decatur tested her Aegis Ballistic Missile Defense System by launching a RIM-161 Standard (SM-3). It was the first such test from a US Aegis destroyer.

In May 2008, Decatur departed on her fifth deployment overall, and fourth deployment to the Persian Gulf. She spent a significant amount of time in 7th Fleet, stopping in Hong Kong, Japan and Singapore before proceeding in to the 5th Fleet area for duties. She returned to San Diego in November 2008. Decatur deployed for the sixth time in May 2009, returning to San Diego in November 2009.

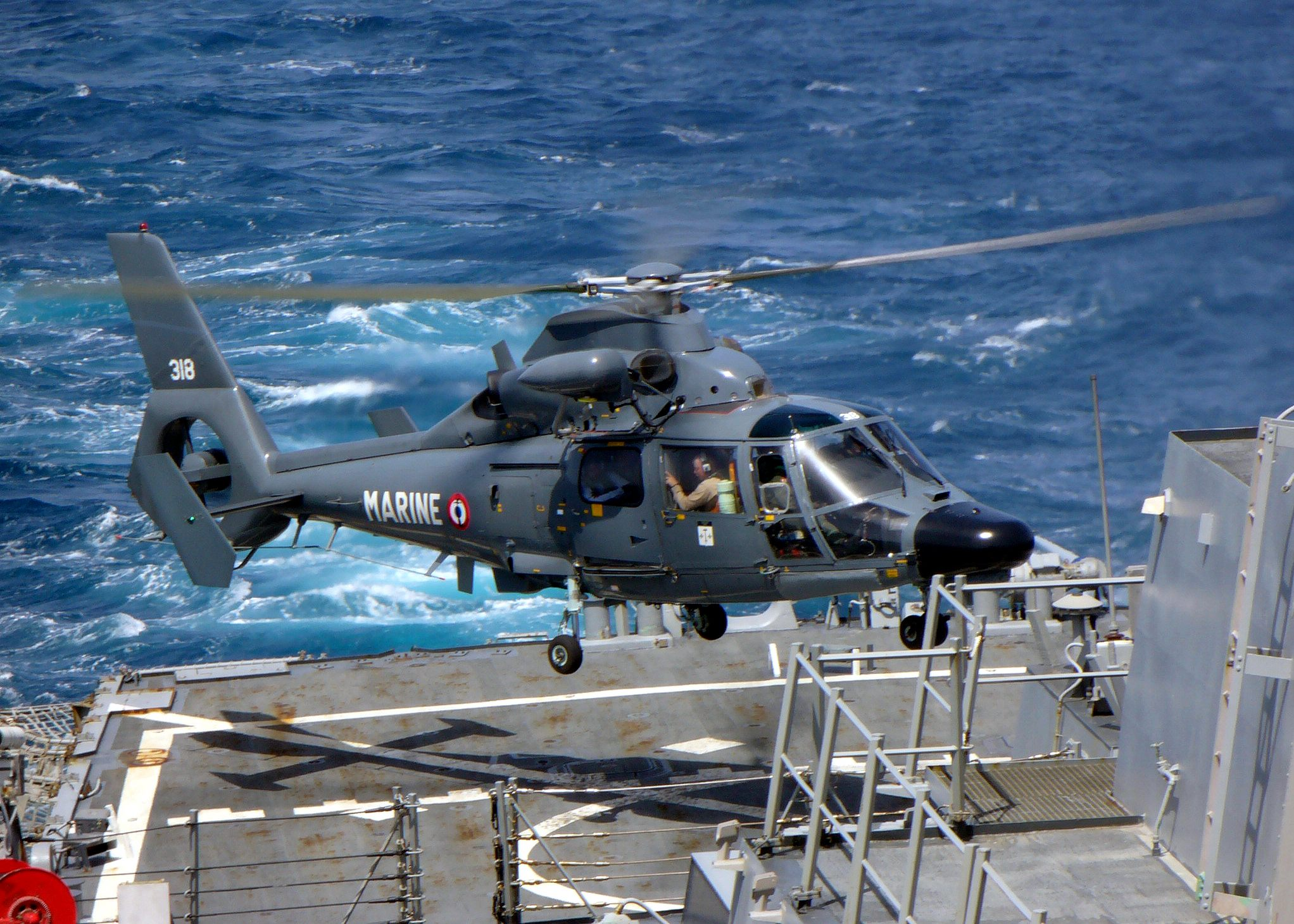
French Navy helicopter lands on USS Decatur's flight deck.

In December 2010, Commander Shanti Sethi was promoted from Executive Officer to Commanding Officer. She is the 12th female commander in the U.S. Navy.

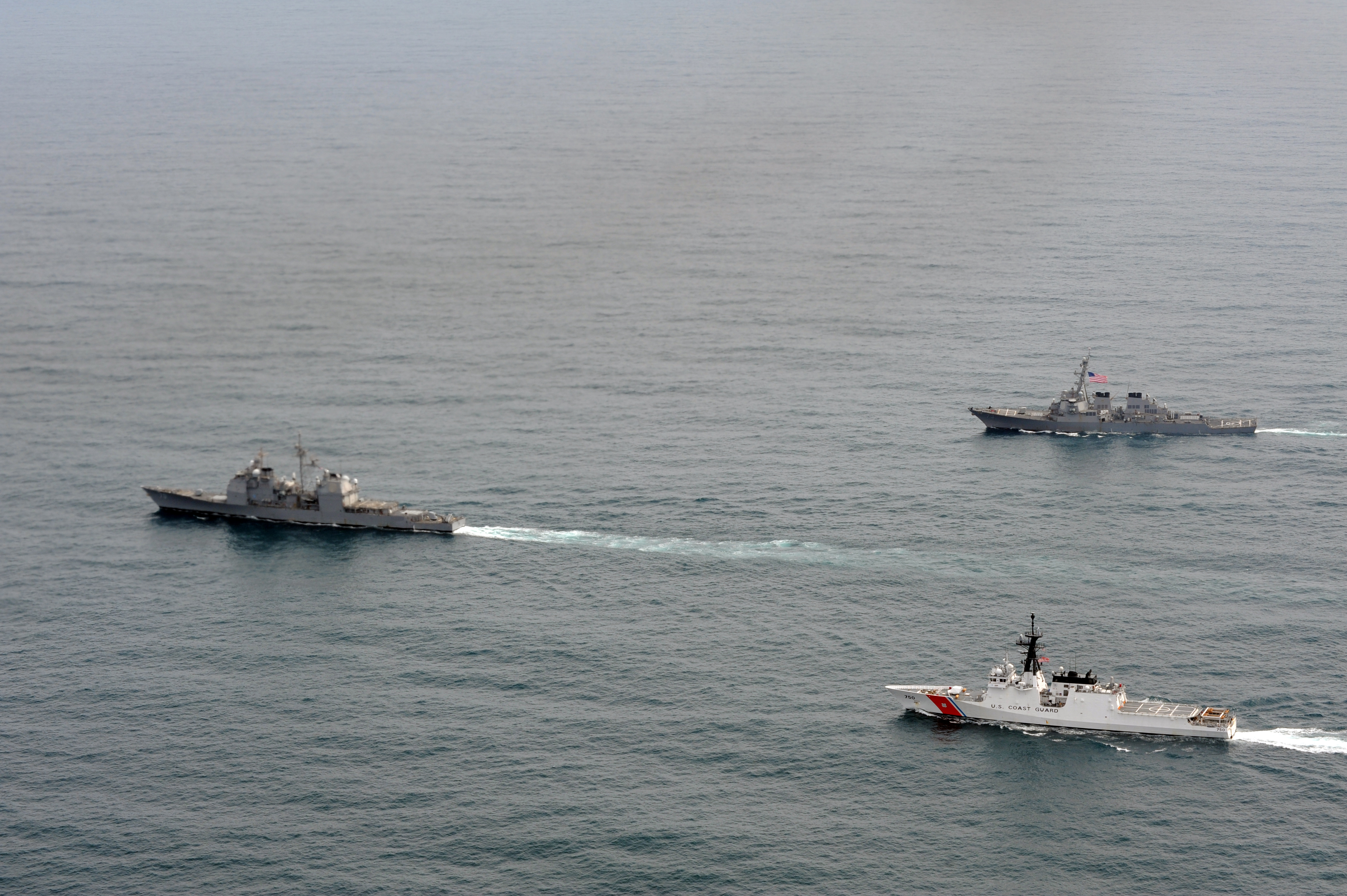
USS Lake Erie (CG-70) (left), Decatur (top right) and, Coast Guard cutter USCGC Bertholf (WMSL-750), during Exercise Northern Edge, 2011

In April 2013, Decatur was sent to the Western Pacific near the Korean Peninsula, to join two other destroyers, John S. McCain and Fitzgerald, in response to growing threats and an increase in belligerent statements and actions by North Korea's leadership. As a show of force and as part of the drills, the U.S. sent bombers and other aircraft (including the B-2 stealth bomber, capable of carrying conventional or nuclear weapons), to the region, and both South Korea and the U.S. pledged to vigorously defend themselves.

On 30 September 2018, Decatur and the Chinese destroyer Lanzhou were involved in a near-collision when the two ships came within 45 yards (41 m) of one another in the South China Sea. The U.S. Navy accused Lanzhou of acting "in an unsafe and unprofessional maneuver in the vicinity of Gaven Reef".

== Coat of arms ==
=== Shield ===
The shield has background of dark blue. In the center is a red crown. Crossing in the center of the crown is an English officer’s sword and a seax.

The traditional Navy colors were chosen for the shield because dark blue and gold represents the sea and excellence respectively. The seax signifies a series of victories by Stephen Decatur over sea forces of North African terrorist nations. The English officer's sword symbolizes Decatur's victory over HMS Macedonian during the war of 1812 in one of the greatest single ship actions of naval history. The celestial crown symbolizes anti-air warfare capabilities. The crown has five mullets for each of the ships named Decatur. It also represents Stephen Decatur's engagements against the British during the war of 1812. The color gold represents excellence, while scarlet denotes courage and sacrifice.

=== Crest ===
The crest consists of a ship’s mast and sail with a flying pennant.

The ship's mast and sail represent the heritage of the Decatur name and the Navy of Stephen Decatur's time, with the first vessel to bear his name. The mast is also in reference to the traditional pine construction of the vessels of Decatur's Navy times. The pennant is to symbolize the senior naval authority which was earned by Commodore Stephen Decatur.

=== Motto ===
The motto is written on a scroll of white that has a blue reverse side.

The ship's motto is "In Pursuit of Peace".

=== Seal ===
The coat of arms in full color as in the blazon, upon a white background enclosed within a dark blue oval border edged on the outside with a gold rope and bearing the inscription "USS Decatur" at the top and "DDG 73" in the base all gold.
