= Olav Kjørven =

Olav Kjørven (born 18 December 1963) is a Norwegian international development professional. Since 1997, he has held senior leadership positions in the Norwegian government, United Nations, and in civil society.

Currently working as an independent consultant, Kjørven notably serves as a Senior Adviser to the Article 109 Coalition, an international civil society organisation calling for UN Charter reform. He previously served as Chief Strategy Officer and Chief Executive Officer at EAT Foundation from 2017 to 2024. From 2014 to 2017, he served as UNICEF's Director for Public Partnerships. Previously, he was Assistant Secretary-General and Director of Bureau for Development Policy at United Nations Development Programme in New York, from 2007 to 2013, followed by a year of serving as the UNDP Administrator's Special Advisor on the post-2015 development agenda. He played a central role in setting up structures and leading analytical work that enabled and supported the negotiations of what became the Sustainable Development Goals. He also coordinated the UN's engagement with the G20, and served as senior adviser to the UN Secretary General on his sustainable energy initiative.

Before joining the United Nations, Kjørven served as a State Secretary for international development in the Ministry of Foreign Affairs between 2001 and 2005. During this period, he laid the groundwork for the Global Commission on the Legal Empowerment of the Poor, which issued its landmark report Making the Law Work for Everyone, in 2008. Between 1997 and 2000, he was political adviser to the Minister of International Development and Human Rights.

Kjørven served as Director of International Development at ECON--Centre for Economic Analysis from 2000 to 2001. He worked for the World Bank as an Environmental Specialist from 1992 to 1997, helping to develop environmental and social safeguards for the bank's lending operations. From 1987 to 1989, he worked as a radio reporter and news announcer at the Norwegian Broadcasting Corporation, NRK.

He obtained his Master of Arts in international affairs from George Washington University's Elliott School of International Affairs, in 1991.
