= Arifa Khalid Pervaiz =

Pakistani politician

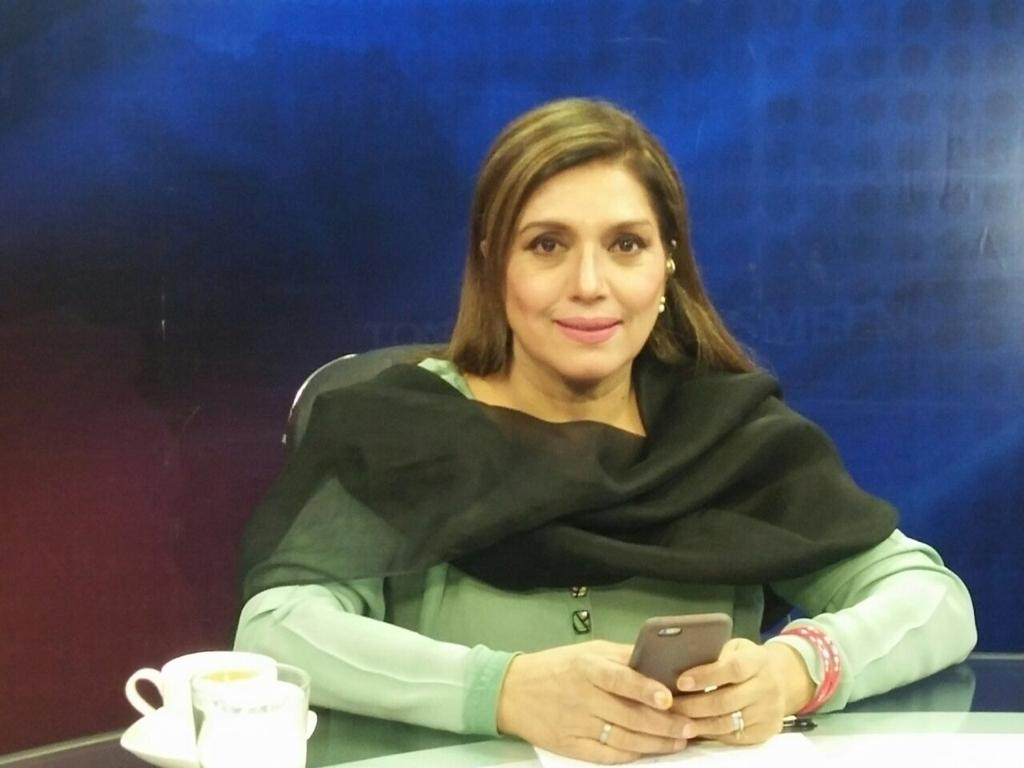

Member of the National Assembly of Pakistan Parliament of Pakistan
- In office 1 June 2013 – 31 May 2018
- Constituency: Member of Parliament

Personal details
- Party: Pakistan Muslim League (N)

Arifa Khalid Pervaiz (Urdu: عارفہ خالد پروین) is a Pakistani politician who had been a member of the National Assembly of Pakistan (Parliament of Pakistan) from June 2013 to May 2018. She has played a major role in reforming Education, Women Empowerment, and Medical Renovation in Pakistan. She has served over 10 years in the Parliament of Pakistan.

== Education ==
She has completed her master's in child development from Government College of Home Economics and completed her master's in International Policy and Practice from the Elliott School of International Affairs, George Washington University.

== Political career ==
She was elected to the Provincial Assembly of the Punjab as a candidate of Pakistan Muslim League (N) in the 2008 Pakistani general election.

She was elected to the National Assembly of Pakistan (Parliament of Pakistan) as a candidate of Pakistan Muslim League (N) on a reserved seat for women in the 2013 Pakistani general election.

She was also elected to the Provincial Assembly of Punjab (Parliament of Punjab) on a reserved seat for women in 2008.
