= Shanti Sethi =

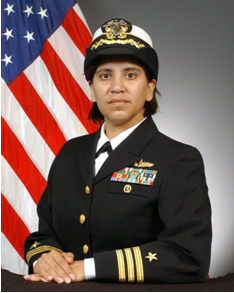
- Official US Navy portrait of Commander Shanti Sethi during her period in command of the USS Decatur between 2010 and 2012
- Born: Reno, Nevada
- Military career
- Branch: United States Navy
- Rank: Captain
- Commands: USS Decatur (DDG-73)

Shanti Sethi is an American naval officer and the only Indian-American woman and the 15th female officer to command a major US Navy combat warship. She commanded the guided missile destroyer USS Decatur from 15 December 2010 to May 2012. From 2021 to 2022, she served as the Navy's Senior Military Advisor to the Secretary of the Navy. From February 2022 until the Fall of 2022, she was detailed to the Office of the Vice President as Executive Secretary and Defense Advisor. She is now detailed to the National Security Council as Director for Talent Management and Recruiting.

== Background ==
Captain Shanti Sethi is a native of Reno, Nevada. She graduated from Norwich University in 1993 with a degree in International Affairs. She also holds a Masters of International Policy and Practice from The George Washington University's Elliott School of International Affairs.

== Career ==
After postings in various ships and naval shore installations, Sethi assumed command of USS Decatur on 15 December 2010.

She is the first female commander of an American naval ship to visit India.

In 2015, she was promoted to the rank of Captain.

Sethi's decorations and awards include the Meritorious Service Medal (two awards), Navy Commendation Medal (four awards), the Navy Achievement Medal, and unit and campaign awards.

In February 2022 Sethi was appointed as the defence advisor to the Vice President of the US, Kamala Harris. She is currently serving as the National Security Council's Director for Talent Management and Recruiting.
