= F. Lynn McNulty =

Lt. Col. Frederick “F.” Lynn McNulty (1939–2012) was the first Director of Information Systems Security for the U.S. State Department, a pioneer in the field of cybersecurity, and has been characterized as the “father” of U.S. federal information security. His peers eulogized him as a tireless advocate for the security of the nation. He was an early and persistent champion of information security in government.

== Cybersecurity ==
McNulty played a key role in influencing U.S. national security policy on everything from export controls on commercial encryption products to the deployment of key federal cybersecurity infrastructure. He was repeatedly called to testify on cybersecurity matters by U.S. House and Senate subcommittees. According to SCMagazine.com’s Robert Bigman, McNulty’s contributions to cybersecurity are “woven into the DNA of almost every government information security policy and program,” and his security initiatives became a model within the federal government and served as the basis for The Computer Security Act of 1987. In its June 15, 2012 edition, Federal Computer Weekly identified McNulty as one of the key thought leaders in the field of cybersecurity during the preceding quarter century.

A Fellow of the International Information Systems Security Consortium (ISC)², McNulty was the recipient of the Federal 100 Award and inducted into the Information Systems Security Association (ISSA) Hall of Fame. His publications include F. Lynn McNulty “Encryption's Importance to Economic and Infrastructure Security”, 9 Duke Journal of Comparative & International Law 427–450 (1999).

== Background & Postscript ==
Born in Alameda, California, McNulty received his B.A. in international affairs from the University of California, Berkeley. He was awarded 2 master's degrees, an M.A. in international affairs from San Jose State and an M.P.A. from George Washington University. A United States Army Reserve officer from 1963 until 1999, Frederick Lynn McNulty was activated for four years during the Vietnam War. In the late 1960s and early 1970s, McNulty worked in information security at the Central Intelligence Agency. He retired from government in 1995. McNulty died of an aggressive lymphoma in 2012. He is buried at Arlington National Cemetery.

== Honors ==
In late 2013, the (ISC)² created the McNulty Award, one of its U.S. Government Information Security Leadership Awards (GISLA), in F. Lynn McNulty's honor. The F. Lynn McNulty Tribute GISLA will recognize a member of the U.S. federal information security community who upholds McNulty’s legacy as a visionary and innovator through outstanding service and commitment. The organization shall bestow the first F. Lynn McNulty GISLA in October, 2013. In 2014, F. Lynn McNulty was, himself, posthumously awarded the Lifetime Achievement Award at the 17th annual bestowing of awards for excellence in information security and public policy at the RSA global information security conference in San Francisco, California. His widow Peggy McNulty accepted the award.
