= Thomas J. Colbert =

American consultant, writer and producer

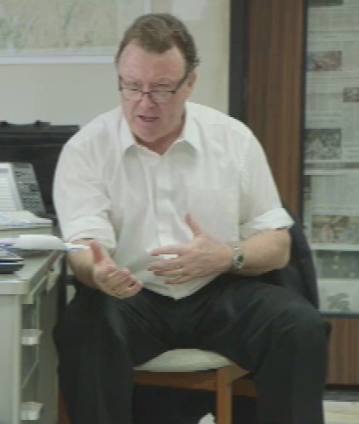
- Occupations: Founder, TJC Consulting
- Known for: Consultant, writer, producer
- Notable work: The Last Master Outlaw
- Website: Thomas Colbert website

Thomas J. Colbert is an American consultant, writer, producer and former media executive. He is the co-author of The Last Master Outlaw, a book that documents his five-year cold case investigation of D. B. Cooper suspect Robert Rackstraw. The book became the subject of a documentary on the History Channel which Colbert exec-produced. He currently operates TJC Consulting, a consulting firm in Los Angeles. Prior to his work as a consultant, he was a story researcher for CBS and Paramount Pictures and founder of media service Industry R&D.

== Career ==
Colbert spent his early career as a story researcher for KCBS-TV in Los Angeles and then with Hard Copy. After 12 years in the business, he founded the true-story tip service Industry R&D, Inc. (IRD). Colbert used his national network of contacts to collect high-profile stories from local media and then sell them to television and motion picture production companies. Tips generated by Colbert became books and films, including The Vow, Baby Brokers, Fly Away Home, and Boys Don't Cry.

Colbert is the co-author of The Last Master Outlaw: How He Outfoxed the FBI Six Times--but Not a Cold Case Team. The book details an investigation organized by Colbert into the identity of a possible suspect in the D.B. Cooper hijacking. The investigation took place over five years and included 40 retired investigators, including a dozen FBI agents. Colbert identified Robert W. Rackstraw Sr. as the main suspect of the crime. The week before Colbert's team was to turn in all of its circumstantial evidence to the Cooper FBI case agent, the Seattle Division canceled a long-planned meeting and later announced the FBI considered the case of D.B. Cooper "administratively closed." The investigation also became the subject of the History Channel documentary D.B. Cooper: Case Closed, which aired in 2016 and was exec-produced by Colbert.

Colbert currently operates Industry R&D LLC www.IndustryRandD.com and TJC Consulting.
