= D. B. Cooper copycat hijackings =

List of D.B. Cooper copycat skyjackings of 1972

August 1972 Life magazine cover highlighting the post-D.B. Cooper wave of extortion hijackings

The apparent success and instant notoriety of the hijacker known as D. B. Cooper in November 1971 resulted in over a dozen copycat hijackings within the next year all using a similar template to that established by Cooper. Like Cooper, the plan would be to hijack an aircraft, demand a ransom, and then parachute from that aircraft as a method of escape. To combat this wave of extortion hijackings, aircraft were fitted with eponymous "Cooper vanes", specifically designed to prevent the aft staircase from being lowered in-flight. The Cooper vane, as well as the widespread implementation of other safety measures such as the installation of metal detectors throughout American airports, would spell the end of the Cooper copycats. In addition, several other hijackings around the world are also believed to have involved hijackers jumping out of planes similar to D.B. Cooper, although these incidents are believed not to have been inspired by D.B. Cooper.

== Copycats in the US ==
=== Everett Holt ===
On December 24, 1971, Everett Holt hijacked Northwest Orient Airlines Flight 734 after its takeoff from Minneapolis on its way to Chicago and demanded $300,000 and two parachutes. Like Cooper, once his ransom was delivered he allowed the passengers to deplane. While he was distracted counting his ransom money, the flight crew escaped from the cockpit. Realizing his plans had been thwarted, Holt surrendered peacefully. Holt would eventually be committed to a mental hospital before the charges were dismissed in May 1975.

=== Billy Hurst ===
On January 12, 1972, 22-year-old Billy Eugene Hurst hijacked Braniff Flight 38 en route from Houston to Dallas. Hurst let the passengers go once the plane landed in Dallas, but held four stewardesses and three flight crew hostage. He demanded $1 million in ransom as well as parachutes, a rope, a machete, and hunting boots. Hurst then demanded that the pilot fly to South America. While the airline struggled to gather the full ransom, friends of Hurst arrived on the scene and persuaded him to surrender without incident. In 1973, Hurst was convicted of aircraft piracy and sentenced to a 20-year prison term.

=== Richard Charles LaPoint ===
On January 20, 1972, Richard Charles LaPoint, an Army veteran from Boston, boarded Hughes Airwest Flight 800 at McCarran International Airport in Las Vegas. Brandishing what he claimed was a bomb while the DC-9 was on the taxiway, he demanded $50,000, two parachutes, and a helmet. After releasing the 51 passengers and two flight attendants, he ordered the plane on an eastward trajectory toward Denver, then bailed out over the treeless plains of northeastern Colorado. Authorities, tracking the locator-equipped parachute and his footprints in the snow and mud, apprehended him a few hours later. At LaPoint's arraignment two days later, the Judge informed him that he was entitled to medical care for an injury sustained in the jump. LaPoint, a Vietnam War veteran suffering from PTSD, responded "How about some mental assistance instead?" On the third day of his trial for aircraft piracy, LaPoint decided to change his plea from not guilty to guilty. As the Judge sentenced LaPoint to forty years in prison, he stated, "This was not an act caused by the Vietnam War. He is not a boy; he's almost 24 years old now. This act was calculated to some extent. There were accounts of D.B. Cooper in his room."

=== Merlyn St. George ===
On January 26, 1972, Merlyn St. George commandeered a Mohawk Airlines flight from Albany, New York, to New York City. Claiming to be armed with a bomb and a pistol, which later turned out to be fakes, St. George demanded $200,000 and two parachutes. St. George would lose his nerve and, instead of parachuting from the aircraft, would demand that a car be prepared for him at an airport in Poughkeepsie, New York. He was shot and killed by an FBI agent as he attempted to flee in the car along with a stewardess he had taken as a hostage.

=== Richard McCoy Jr. ===
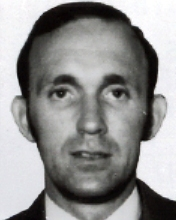
Richard McCoy Jr.

On April 7, 1972, Richard McCoy (1942–1974), staged the best-known of the copycat hijackings. He boarded United Airlines' Flight 855 (a Boeing 727 with aft stairs) in Denver, Colorado, and, brandishing what later proved to be a paperweight resembling a hand grenade and an unloaded handgun, he demanded four parachutes and $500,000. After delivery of the money and parachutes at San Francisco International Airport, McCoy ordered the aircraft back into the sky and bailed out over Provo, Utah, leaving behind his handwritten hijacking instructions and his fingerprints on a magazine he had been reading.

McCoy was an Army veteran who served two tours of duty in Vietnam, first as a demolition expert and later with the Green Berets as a helicopter pilot. After his military service, he became a warrant officer in the Utah National Guard and an avid recreational skydiver, with aspirations of becoming a Utah State Trooper. He was arrested on April 9 with the ransom cash in his possession and, after trial and conviction, received a 45-year sentence. Two years later, he escaped from Lewisburg Federal Penitentiary with several accomplices by crashing a garbage truck through the main gate. Tracked down three months later in Virginia Beach, McCoy was killed in a shootout with FBI agents.

=== Stanley Speck ===
On April 10, 1972, Stanley Speck, a Stanford graduate working as a taxi-cab driver, hijacked a Pacific Southwest Airlines flight en route from Oakland, California, to San Diego, California. Speck demanded $500,000 and two parachutes, claiming to be armed with a hand-grenade and a pistol. Speck was arrested on the ground in San Diego when the pilot tricked Speck into leaving the aircraft to retrieve maps from two FBI agents who were dressed as mechanics. It was later revealed that Speck was entirely unarmed during the hijacking.

=== Frederick Hahneman ===
On May 5, 1972, Frederick William Hahneman (July 5, 1922 – December 17, 1991), a Honduras-born US citizen, hijacked Eastern Air Lines Flight 175 en route from Allentown, Pennsylvania, to Miami, Florida. Hahneman had a variety of ransom demands, including $303,000, six parachutes, two bush knives, two jump suits, and cigarettes. He was dissatisfied with the small denominations used in the ransom and demanded that the provided ransom be traded in for cash in $100's, $500's, and $1,000's. Hahneman parachuted from the plane over his native Honduras after extorting $303,000 during a refueling stop in New Orleans, Louisiana. Evading a manhunt by the FBI and Honduran police and with a $25,000 bounty on his head, Hahneman went on the run for 28 days before finally surrendering to the US Embassy in Tegucigalpa. He was sentenced to life imprisonment for aircraft hijacking, kidnapping and extortion, serving 12 years.

=== Robb Heady ===
On June 2, 1972, Robb Heady, a 22-year-old former Army paratrooper and Vietnam War veteran, hijacked United Airlines Flight 239 from Reno to San Francisco. Carrying his own parachute and using a .357 revolver, he demanded $200,000 in ransom money. Because the hijacking occurred at night while banks were closed, FBI agents were forced to secure the ransom money from two local casinos in Reno. Once he had received the ransom, Heady directed the pilots on a very specific flight path. However, the pilot intentionally altered the flight path by half a degree, causing Heady to miss his drop zone. Heady was captured the next morning. The money bag containing Heady's ransom was jerked from his grasp when he pulled the ripcord and was recovered by FBI agents two days later. In September 1972 Heady pled guilty to aircraft piracy and was sentenced to serve 30 years in federal prison.

=== Martin McNally ===
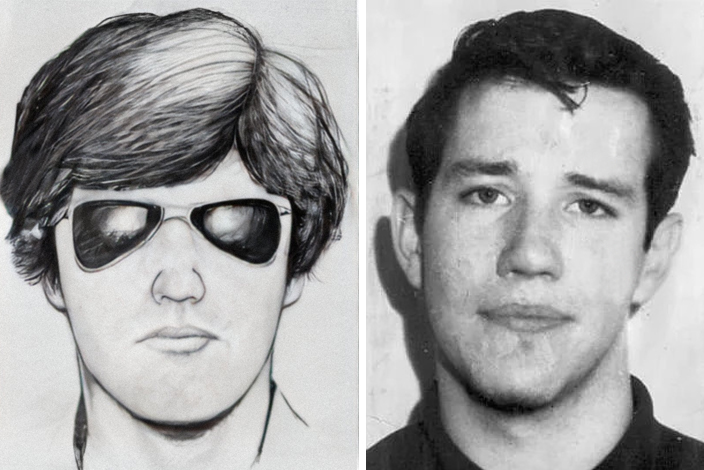
Composite sketch of skyjacker Martin McNally and mugshot from his arrest a week after the hijacking (he had worn a wig during the hijacking)

On June 23, 1972, Martin McNally, an unemployed service-station attendant, used a submachine gun to commandeer an American Airlines 727 en route from St. Louis, Missouri, to Tulsa, Oklahoma, then diverted it eastward to Indiana and bailed out with $500,000 in ransom. When the 727 was preparing to take off after McNally had received the ransom money, a local man drove his Cadillac onto the runway and rammed the 727 at speeds of up to 80 mph. The driver, David J. Hanley, was seriously injured in the collision with the jet. The collision disabled the 727, forcing McNally to switch to a second 727. McNally lost the ransom money as he exited the aircraft, but landed safely near Peru, Indiana, and was apprehended a few days later in a Detroit suburb. When interviewed in a 2020 podcast retrospective, McNally said he had been inspired by Cooper.

=== Daniel Carre ===
On June 30, 1972, Daniel Bernard Carre attempted to hijack a Hughes Air West flight from Seattle, Washington, to Portland, Oregon, by claiming he had a knife. He demanded $50,000 and a parachute. Carre was apprehended by U.S. Marshals immediately upon landing in Portland and was sent to a psychiatric hospital for an undetermined amount of time.

=== Francis Goodell ===
On July 6, 1972, twenty-one-year-old Francis Goodell hijacked a Pacific Southwest Airlines flight from Oakland to Sacramento. Goodell had two pistols and demanded $455,000, a parachute, and an instruction manual on how to skydive. He was suffering from PTSD due to his experiences during the Vietnam War and claimed that he wanted to give the money to children in Southeast Asia to absolve himself of wartime guilt. An off-duty Highway Patrolman traveling as a passenger eventually convinced Goodell to surrender. Goodell would be sentenced to 30 years for air piracy.

=== Michael Green and Lulseged Tesfa ===
On July 13, 1972, a National Airlines flight from Philadelphia to New York was hijacked by thirty-four-year-old Michael Stanley Green and twenty-four year old Lulseged Tesfa. Green, a parking lot attendant, and Tesfa, an Ethiopian student at Howard University, concocted the plan while living as roommates in Washington D.C. The duo began the hijacking as the flight approached New York and demanded the plane return to Philadelphia where they demanded $600,000 and three parachutes. Gathering the ransom demand took over six hours while passengers sweated in the heat of the aircraft, which had lost electrical power. Upon receipt of the ransom, the passengers were released but the duo kept four stewardesses and the flight crew hostage and demanded that they be flown to Houston. Before takeoff to Houston, the Captain leapt from the window of the cockpit, forcing the co-pilot to fly the aircraft. When the plane landed on a tiny airstrip in Lake Jackson, Texas, the co-pilot and flight engineer both jumped from the cockpit, abandoning the stewardesses with the hijackers. Green and Tesfa would emerge from the aft stairs of the 727 shortly after with their hands up, surrendering to FBI agents on the ground. Green would later be sentenced to a 50-year prison term and Tesfa sentenced to serve a 60-year term. Green was released in 1984, and Tesfa in 1982.

=== Melvin Fisher ===
On July 13, 1972, forty-nine year old Melvin M. Fisher, an unemployed painter and former bootlegger from Oklahoma, hijacked an American Airlines 727 flight from Oklahoma City to Dallas. Fisher demanded $550,000 and a parachute. Although scheduled to originally land in Dallas, bad weather forced the plane to return to Oklahoma City where Fisher received $200,000 of his ransom. Satisfied with this amount, Fisher released 51 passengers and three stewardesses, keeping one stewardess and the three members of the flight crew as hostages. He then ordered the plane to circle Oklahoma City. With the rear stairs down and wearing his parachute, Fisher was unable to locate a landmark for his jump and lost his nerve for the jump. He then surrendered to the crew, telling them that he did not want to die. Fisher would be sentenced to life imprisonment following a trial in September 1972.

== Copycats in other countries ==
- On November 6, 1972, a Japan Airlines 727 was hijacked in Tokyo by Tatsuji Nakaoka, a 47-year-old Japanese national who had been living in Los Angeles since 1948. Nakaoka demanded $2 million and a flight to Havana, Cuba. To enforce his demand, Nakaoka used a .38 caliber pistol and also had over thirty pounds of gunpowder and nitroglycerine. He also brought with him a parachute he purchased in Los Angeles. Japanese authorities believe he intended to bail out from the 727 along with his ransom when the aircraft passed over Los Angeles on the way to Havana. During negotiations, he was overpowered by police Judo experts.
- On September 4, 1992: Vietnam Airlines Flight 850, an Airbus A310-200, registration LZ-JXB, leased from Jes Air, with 127 occupants on board en route from Bangkok to Ho Chi Minh City, hijacked by Ly Tong, a former pilot in the Republic of Vietnam Air Force. He then dropped anti-communist leaflets over Ho Chi Minh City before parachuting out. Vietnamese security forces later arrested him on the ground. The aircraft landed safely, and no one on board was injured. He was released from a Hanoi prison in 1998. His actions were motivated by the collapse of the Soviet Union and the Eastern Bloc.
- On May 25, 2000, Philippine Airlines Flight 812, en route from Davao to Manila, was hijacked by a man with marital problems. The hijacker used a homemade parachute, had a crew member assist him in jumping by pushing him out of the plane, and fell to his death with his parachute undeployed. None of the passengers or crew were harmed.
