= D.B. Cooper: Where Are You?! =

Documentary series about plane hijacker D.B. Cooper

D.B. Cooper: Where Are You?! is a four-part documentary mini-series released by Netflix in 2022. The series discusses the history and investigation of the Northwest Orient Airlines hijacking by the man known as D. B. Cooper in 1971 and includes interviews with investigators and journalists involved with investigating the case. (Trailer)

== Cast ==
- Eric Ulis, private investigator
- Thomas J. Colbert, private investigator
- Jonna Mendez, former chief of disguise at the CIA
- Geoffrey Gray, journalist and author
- Erik Kleinsmith, former chief of intelligence, United States Army Land Warfare Unit
- Thomas Fuentes, former assistant director of the FBI
