= D. B. Cooper =

Unidentified 1971 airplane hijacker

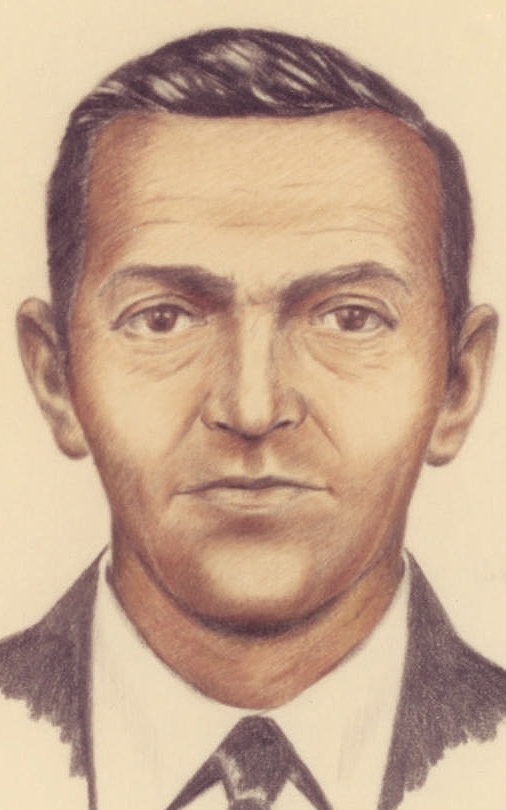
- A 1972 FBI composite drawing of Dan Cooper
- Disappeared: November 24, 1971 (54 years ago)
- Status: Missing/Unidentified
- Other name: Dan Cooper (actual alias used)
- Known for: Hijacking a Boeing 727 and parachuting from the plane mid flight before disappearing
- Status: Never apprehended
- Criminal charges: Air piracy and violation of the Hobbs Act
- Capture status: Fugitive, never identified or captured
- Wanted by: FBI
- Wanted since: November 24, 1971 (case was closed in 2016)
- Website: www.fbi.gov/history/famous-cases/db-cooper-hijacking

On November 24, 1971, an unidentified man using the alias Dan Cooper, later erroneously known as D. B. Cooper, hijacked Northwest Orient Airlines Flight 305, a Boeing 727 aircraft flying from Portland, Oregon, to Seattle, Washington. Cooper told the flight crew he had a bomb, and demanded $200,000 in ransom (equivalent to $1,600,000 in 2025) and four parachutes upon landing in Seattle.

After releasing the passengers in Seattle, Cooper directed the crew to refuel the aircraft and begin a second flight to Mexico City, with a refueling stop in Reno, Nevada. After taking off from Seattle, Cooper opened the aircraft's aft door, deployed the airstair and parachuted to an uncertain fate over a remote, heavily wooded area of Southwest Washington. Because of a reporter's error, the aircraft hijacker became known as D. B. Cooper. His true identity and fate remain unknown.

In 1980, a small portion of the ransom money ($6,000) was found along the banks of the Columbia River near Vancouver, Washington. The discovery of the money renewed public interest in the crime but yielded no additional information, and the remaining money was never recovered. For 45 years after the hijacking, the Federal Bureau of Investigation (FBI) maintained an active investigation and built an extensive case file, but did not reach any definitive conclusions about Cooper's identity. Although the FBI officially suspended active investigation of the case in 2016, journalists, professional investigators, and amateur sleuths continue to pursue numerous theories for Cooper's identity and ultimate fate.

Cooper's hijacking—and several imitators (known as the D. B. Cooper copycat hijackings) the following year—prompted immediate and major upgrades to security measures for airports and commercial aviation. Metal detectors were installed at airports, baggage inspection became mandatory, and passengers who paid cash for tickets on the day of departure were selected for additional scrutiny. The Cooper hijacking is the only documented unsolved case of air piracy in the history of commercial aviation.

== Hijacking ==
Northwest Orient Airlines Flight 305
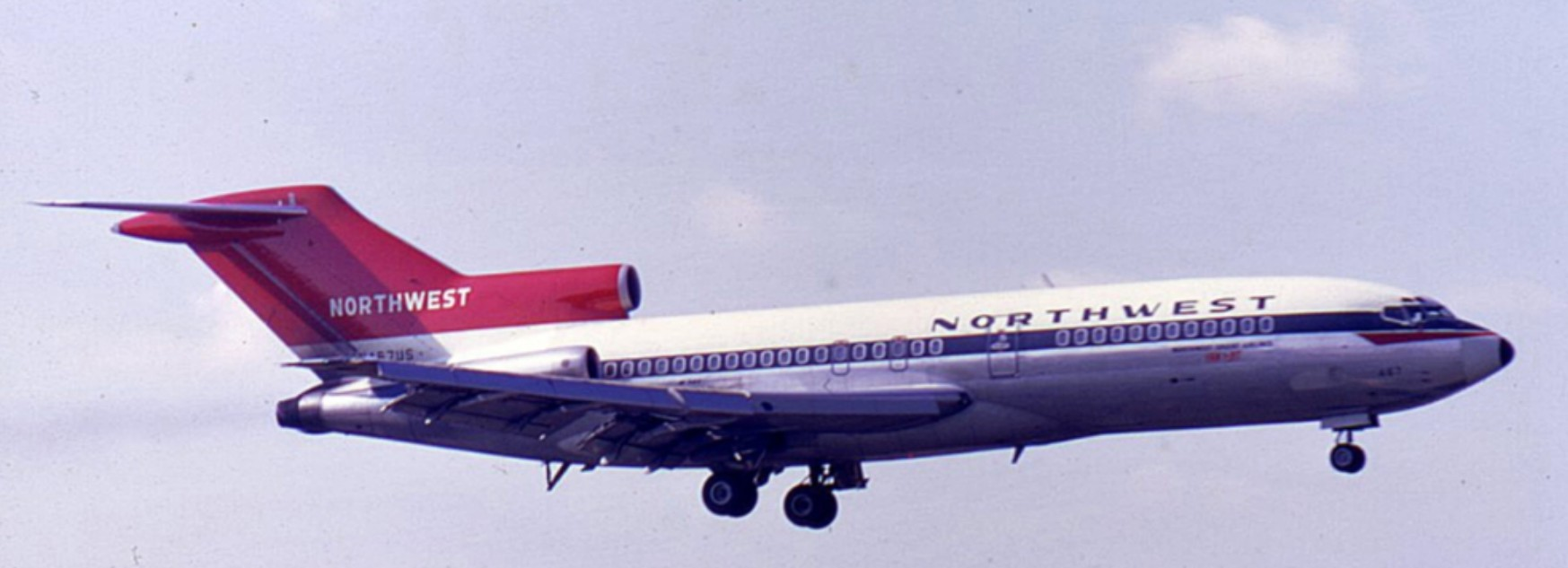
- N467US, the aircraft involved in the hijacking, seen in 1972

Hijacking
- Date: November 24, 1971
- Summary: Hijacking and extortion
- Site: Between Portland, Oregon, U.S., and Seattle, Washington, U.S.

Aircraft
- Aircraft type: Boeing 727-51
- Operator: Northwest Orient Airlines
- Call sign: NORTHWEST 305
- Registration: N467US
- Flight origin: Portland International Airport
- Destination: Seattle–Tacoma International Airport
- Occupants: 42 (including hijacker)
- Passengers: 36 (including hijacker)
- Crew: 6
- Missing: 1 (hijacker)
- Survivors: 41

On November 24, 1971 (Thanksgiving Eve), a man approached the flight counter for Northwest Orient Airlines at Portland International Airport. Using cash, he bought a one-way ticket on Flight 305, a 30-minute trip north to Seattle–Tacoma International Airport (Sea-Tac). On his ticket, the man listed his name as "Dan Cooper". Eyewitnesses described Cooper as a white male in his mid-40s, with dark hair and brown eyes, wearing a black or brown business suit, a white shirt, a thin black tie, a black raincoat and brown shoes. Carrying a black attaché case and a brown paper bag, Cooper boarded Flight 305, a Boeing 727-100 (FAA registration N467US). Cooper took seat 18-E in the last row and ordered a drink, a bourbon and 7-Up, from a flight attendant.

Including Cooper, Flight 305 had 36 passengers aboard and a crew of six: Captain William A. Scott, First Officer William "Bill" J. Rataczak, flight engineer Harold E. Anderson, and flight attendants Alice Hancock, Tina Mucklow and Florence Schaffner. Flight 305 left Portland on schedule at 2:50 pm PST. Shortly after takeoff, Cooper handed a note to flight attendant Schaffner, who was sitting in the jump seat at the rear of the airplane, directly behind Cooper. Assuming the note was a lonely businessman's telephone number, Schaffner dropped the note unopened into her purse. Cooper then leaned toward her and whispered, "Miss, you'd better look at that note. I have a bomb."

Schaffner opened the note. In neat, all-capital letters printed with a felt-tip pen, Cooper had written, "Miss—I have a bomb in my briefcase and want you to sit by me." Schaffner returned the note to Cooper, sat down as he requested, and asked quietly to see the bomb. Cooper opened his attaché case, and Schaffner saw what appeared to be a bomb: a large cylindrical battery attached with wires to two rows of four red cylinders she assumed were dynamite.

Cooper closed the briefcase and told Schaffner his demands. Schaffner wrote a note with Cooper's demands, brought it to the cockpit, and informed the flight crew of the situation. Captain Scott directed Schaffner to remain in the cockpit for the remainder of the flight and take notes of events as they happened. He then relayed to Northwest flight operations in Minnesota the hijacker's demands: "[Cooper] requests $200,000 in a knapsack by 5:00 pm. He wants two front parachutes, two back parachutes. He wants the money in negotiable American currency." (Note: Earl Cossey, the skydiving instructor who supplied the parachutes, told some sources three of the four parachutes (one primary and both reserves) were returned to him. The FBI maintained only two parachutes, a primary and a cannibalized reserve, were found aboard the airplane.) By requesting two sets of parachutes, Cooper implied he planned to take a hostage with him, thereby discouraging authorities from supplying non-functional equipment.

With Schaffner in the cockpit, flight attendant Mucklow sat next to Cooper to act as a liaison between him and the flight crew. Cooper made additional demands through Mucklow: upon landing at Sea-Tac, fuel trucks must meet the plane, and all passengers must remain seated while Mucklow brought the money aboard the plane. Cooper said he would release the passengers after he had the money. The last items brought aboard would be the four parachutes.

Scott informed Sea–Tac air traffic control of the situation, who contacted the Seattle Police Department (SPD) and the Federal Bureau of Investigation (FBI). The passengers were told their arrival in Seattle would be delayed because of a "minor mechanical difficulty". Donald Nyrop, the president of Northwest at the time, authorized payment of the ransom and ordered all employees to cooperate with the hijacker and comply with his demands. For approximately two hours, Flight 305 circled Puget Sound in a holding pattern to give the SPD and the FBI sufficient time to assemble Cooper's ransom money and parachutes, and to mobilize emergency personnel.

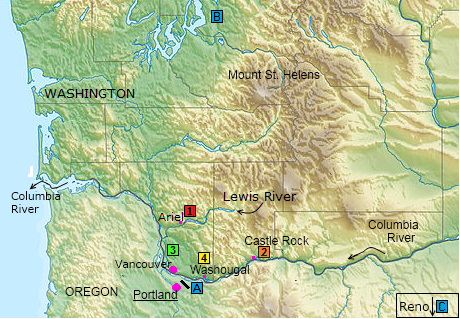
Thematic map of Cooper's hijacking

On board the aircraft, Cooper demanded Mucklow remain by his side at all times. Mucklow later said Cooper appeared familiar with the local terrain; while looking out the window, he remarked, "Looks like Tacoma down there", as the aircraft flew above it. When Mucklow told Cooper the parachutes were coming from McChord Air Force Base, Cooper correctly noted McChord was only a 20-minute drive from Sea-Tac. She later described the hijacker's demeanor: "[Cooper] was not nervous. He seemed rather nice and he was not cruel or nasty."

While the aircraft continued circling Seattle, Mucklow chatted with Cooper and asked why he chose Northwest Airlines to hijack. Cooper laughed and said, "It's not because I have a grudge against your airline, it's just because I have a grudge", before he explained the flight simply suited his needs. Cooper asked where Mucklow was from; she answered she was originally from Pennsylvania but was living in Minneapolis at the time. Cooper responded Minnesota was "very nice country." Mucklow asked where Cooper was from but he became upset and refused to answer. Cooper asked Mucklow if she smoked and offered her a cigarette. Mucklow replied she had quit but accepted the cigarette.

FBI records note Cooper spoke briefly to an unidentified passenger while the aircraft maintained its holding pattern over Seattle. In his interview with FBI agents, passenger George Labissoniere stated he visited the restroom directly behind Cooper on several occasions. After one visit, Labissoniere said the path to his seat was blocked by a passenger wearing a cowboy hat, who was questioning Mucklow about the supposed mechanical problem delaying them. Labissoniere said Cooper was initially amused by the interaction, then became irritated and told the man to return to his seat, but "the cowboy" ignored Cooper and continued to question Mucklow. Labissoniere claimed he eventually persuaded "the cowboy" to return to his seat.

Mucklow's version of the interaction differed from Labissoniere's. She said a passenger approached her and asked for a sports magazine to read because he was bored. She and the passenger moved to an area directly behind Cooper, where they both looked for magazines. The passenger took a copy of The New Yorker and returned to his seat. When Mucklow returned to sit with Cooper, he said, "If that is a sky marshal, I don't want any more of that," but Mucklow reassured Cooper no sky marshals were on the flight. Despite his brief interaction with Cooper, "the cowboy" was not interviewed by the FBI.

The $200,000 ransom was received from Seattle First National Bank in a bag weighing approximately 19 pounds (8.5 kg). This was because the ransom money was made of 10,000 unmarked $20 bills, as Cooper had specifically requested. The money, most of which had serial numbers beginning with "L" and thus indicated issuance by the Federal Reserve Bank of San Francisco, was photographed on microfilm by the FBI. The SPD obtained the two front (reserve) parachutes from a local skydiving school, and the two back (main) parachutes from a local stunt pilot.

=== Passengers released ===
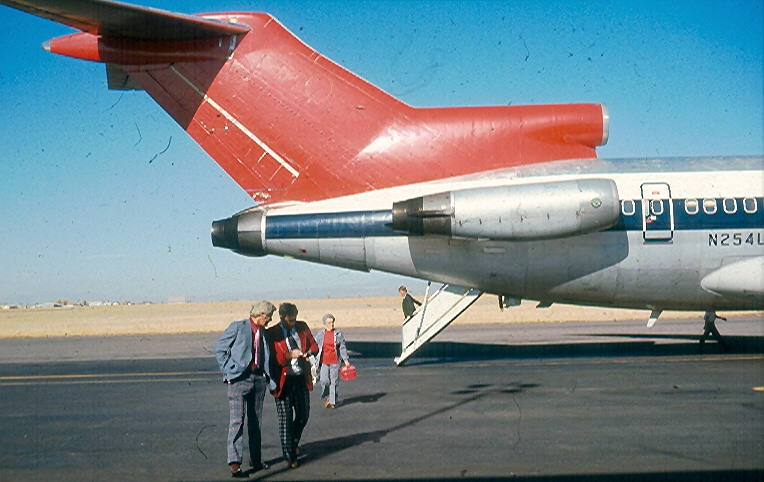
Boeing 727 with the aft airstair open

Around 5:24 PST, Captain Scott was informed the parachutes had been delivered to Sea-Tac and notified Cooper they would be landing soon. At 5:46 PST, Flight 305 landed at Sea-Tac. With Cooper's permission, Scott parked the aircraft on a partially lit runway, away from the main terminal. Cooper demanded only one representative of the airline approach the plane with the parachutes and money, and the only entrance and exit would be through the aircraft's front door via boarding stairs.

Northwest's Seattle operations manager, Al Lee, was designated to be the courier. To avoid the possibility Cooper might mistake Lee's airline uniform for a law enforcement officer, he changed into civilian clothes for the task. With the passengers remaining seated, a ground crew attached a boarding stair. Per Cooper's directive, Mucklow exited the aircraft through the front door and retrieved the bag containing the ransom money. When she returned, she carried the bag past the seated passengers to Cooper in the last row.

Cooper then agreed to release the passengers. As they disembarked, Cooper inspected the money. In an attempt to break the tension, Mucklow jokingly asked Cooper if she could have some of it. Cooper readily agreed and handed her a packet of bills, but she immediately returned the money and explained accepting gratuities was against company policy. She said Cooper had tried to tip her and the other two flight attendants earlier in the flight with money from his pocket, but they had each declined, citing the policy.

With the passengers safely disembarked, only Cooper and the six crew members remained aboard. In accordance with his demands, Mucklow made three trips outside the aircraft to retrieve the parachutes, which she brought to him in the rear of the plane. When Mucklow brought the final parachute to Cooper, she gave him printed instructions for using the parachutes, but Cooper said he did not need them. With all of his ransom items aboard, lead flight attendant Hancock then asked Cooper if the flight attendants could leave, to which he replied, "Whatever you girls would like", but directed that Mucklow had to stay with him. Hancock and Schaffner immediately exited the aircraft. Shortly after their release, Schaffner re-entered the aircraft to retrieve her purse, which was stored in a compartment behind Cooper's seat. When she asked for Cooper's permission to move behind him to grab her purse, he said that was fine and jokingly told her: "I won't bite".

A problem with the refueling process caused a delay, so a second truck and then a third were brought to the aircraft to complete the refueling. During the delay, Mucklow said Cooper complained the money was delivered in a cloth bag instead of a knapsack as he had directed, and he now had to improvise a new way to transport the money. Using a pocket knife, he cut the canopy from one of the reserve parachutes, and stuffed some of the money into the empty parachute bag.

A Federal Aviation Administration (FAA) official requested a face-to-face meeting with Cooper aboard the aircraft, but Cooper denied the request. Cooper became impatient, saying, "This shouldn't take so long...let's get this show on the road." Cooper then gave the cockpit crew his flight plan and directives: a south east course toward Mexico City at the minimum airspeed possible without stalling the aircraft—approximately 100 knots (185 km/h; 115 mph)—at a maximum 10,000-foot (3,000 m) altitude. Cooper also instructed Rataczak to keep the landing gear deployed, lower the wing flaps to 15°, and leave the cabin unpressurized.

First Officer Rataczak informed Cooper the configuration limited the aircraft's range to about 1,000 miles (1,600 km), so a second refueling would be necessary before entering Mexico. Cooper and the crew discussed options, agreeing on Reno–Tahoe International Airport as the refueling stop. Cooper further directed the aircraft take off with the aft exit door open and its airstair extended. Northwest officials objected for reasons of safety, but Cooper countered by saying, "It can be done, do it." However, Cooper relented and said he would lower the airstair himself once they were airborne. Cooper demanded Mucklow remain aboard to assist the operation.

=== Back in the air ===
Crew of Flight 305, upon landing in Reno, from left to right: Captain William Scott, co-pilot Bill Rataczak, flight attendant Tina Mucklow, and flight engineer Harold E. Anderson

Around 7:40 pm, Flight 305 took off, with only Cooper, Mucklow, Scott, Rataczak and flight engineer Anderson aboard. Two F-106 fighters from McChord Air Force Base, plus a Lockheed T-33 trainer—diverted from an unrelated Air National Guard mission—followed the 727. All three jets maintained "S" flight patterns to stay behind the slow-moving 727, and out of Cooper's view. After takeoff, Cooper instructed Mucklow to lower the aft airstair. Mucklow told him and the flight crew she feared being sucked out of the aircraft.

The flight crew suggested Mucklow come to the cockpit and retrieve an emergency rope with which she could tie herself to a seat. Cooper rejected the suggestion, stating he did not want her going up front or the flight crew coming back to the cabin. Mucklow continued to express her fear to Cooper, and asked him to cut some cord from one of the parachutes to create a safety line for her. Cooper said he would lower the airstair, instructed her to go to the cockpit, close the curtain partition between the coach and first class sections and not return.

Before she left, Mucklow begged Cooper, "Please, please take the bomb with you." Cooper replied he would either disarm it or take it with him. As Mucklow walked to the cockpit and turned to close the curtain partition, she saw Cooper standing in the aisle tying what appeared to be the money bag around his waist. From takeoff to when Mucklow entered the cockpit, four to five minutes had elapsed. For the rest of the flight to Reno, Mucklow remained in the cockpit, and was the last person to see Cooper. Around 8:00 pm, a cockpit warning light flashed, indicating the airstair had been deployed. Scott and Rataczak used the plane's intercom to ask Cooper if he needed assistance, but Cooper declined. The crew's ears popped from the drop in air pressure from the aft exit door being opened. At approximately 8:13 p.m., the aircraft's tail section suddenly pitched upward, forcing the pilots to trim and return the aircraft to level flight. In his interview with the FBI, Rataczak said the sudden upward pitch occurred while the flight was near Portland's northern suburbs.

With the aft exit door open and its airstair deployed, the flight crew remained in the cockpit, unsure if Cooper was still aboard. Mucklow used the intercom to inform Cooper they were approaching Reno and he needed to raise the airstair so the airplane could land safely. She repeated her requests as the pilots made the final approach to land, but neither Mucklow nor the flight crew received a reply from Cooper. At 11:02 pm, with the airstair still deployed, Flight 305 landed at Reno–Tahoe International Airport. FBI agents, state troopers, sheriff's deputies, and Reno police established a perimeter around the aircraft; fearing the hijacker and the bomb were still aboard, they did not approach the plane. Scott searched the cabin and confirmed Cooper was no longer aboard. After a 30-minute search, an FBI bomb squad declared the cabin safe.

== Investigation ==
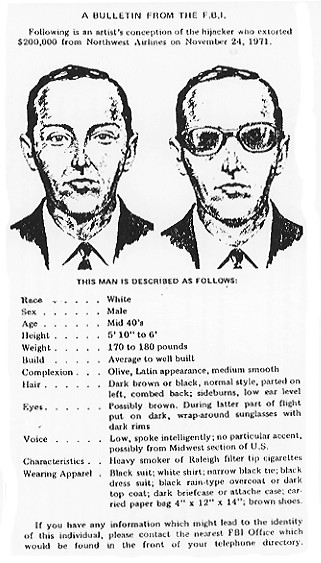
FBI wanted poster of Cooper

In addition to 66 latent fingerprints aboard the plane, FBI agents recovered Cooper's black clip-on tie, tie clip and two of the four parachutes, one of which had been opened and had three shroud lines cut from the canopy. Investigators interviewed eyewitnesses in Portland, Seattle and Reno, and developed a series of composite sketches. Local and federal authorities immediately began questioning possible suspects. On the CBS Evening News, Walter Cronkite reported the suspect's name as "D. A. Cooper", and in a rush to meet a deadline, reporter James Long of The Oregon Journal recorded the name "Dan Cooper" as "D. B. Cooper". United Press International wire service reporter Clyde Jabin republished Long's error, and as other media outlets repeated the error, the name "D. B. Cooper" stuck.

Acting on the possibility the hijacker may have used his real name (or the same alias in a previous crime), Portland police discovered and interviewed a local resident named D. B. Cooper. The Portland Cooper had a minor police record but was quickly eliminated as a suspect. Due to the number of variables and parameters, precisely defining the area to search was difficult. The 727's airspeed estimates varied, the environmental conditions along the flight path varied with the aircraft's location and altitude, and only Cooper knew how long he remained in free fall before pulling his ripcord. The F-106 pilots neither saw anyone jumping from the airliner nor did their radar detect a deployed parachute. A black-clad man jumping into the moonless night would be difficult to see, especially given the limited visibility, cloud cover and lack of ground lighting. The T-33 pilots did not make visual contact with the 727.

On December 6, 1971, 12 days after the incident, FBI director J. Edgar Hoover approved the use of a U.S. Air Force SR-71 Blackbird to retrace and photograph Flight 305's flightpath, and attempt to locate the items Cooper carried during his jump. The SR-71 made five such flights; due to poor visibility, the photography attempts were unsuccessful. In an experimental recreation, flying the same aircraft used in the hijacking in the same flight configuration, FBI agents pushed a 200-pound (91 kg) sled out of the aft airstair and were able to reproduce the upward motion of the tail section and brief change in cabin pressure described by the flight crew at 8:13 pm. Initial extrapolations placed Cooper's landing zone within an area on the southernmost outreach of Mount St. Helens, a few miles south east of Ariel, Washington, near Lake Merwin, an artificial lake formed by a dam on the Lewis River. Search efforts concentrated on Clark and Cowlitz counties, encompassing the terrain immediately south and north of the Lewis River in Southwest Washington. FBI agents and sheriff's deputies searched large areas of the largely forested terrain on foot and by helicopter. Door-to-door searches of local farmhouses were also performed. Other search parties ran patrol boats along Lake Merwin and Yale Lake, the reservoir immediately to its east. Neither Cooper nor any of the equipment he presumably carried were found.

Using fixed-wing aircraft and helicopters from the Oregon Army National Guard, the FBI coordinated an aerial search along the entire flight path known as Victor 23 in U.S. aviation terminology, and as "Vector 23" in most Cooper literature, from Seattle to Reno. Although numerous broken treetops and several pieces of plastic and other objects resembling parachute canopies were sighted and investigated, nothing relevant to the hijacking was found. Soon after the spring thaw in early 1972, teams of FBI agents aided by some 200 soldiers from Fort Lewis, along with Air Force personnel, National Guardsmen and civilian volunteers, conducted another thorough ground search of Clark and Cowlitz Counties for 18 days in March, and then another 18 days in April. Electronic Explorations Company, a marine-salvage firm, used a submarine to search the 200-foot (61 m) depths of Lake Merwin. Two local women discovered a skeleton in an abandoned structure in Clark County. The remains were subsequently identified as Barbara Ann Derry, a teenaged girl believed to have been abducted and murdered several weeks earlier by Warren Forrest, a suspected serial killer. Ultimately, the extensive search and recovery operation yielded no significant material evidence related to the hijacking.

Based on early computer projections produced for the FBI, Cooper's drop zone was first estimated to be between the Lewis River dam to the north and the town of Battle Ground, Washington, to the south. In March 1972, after a joint investigation with Northwest Orient Airlines and the US Air Force, the FBI determined Cooper probably jumped over the city of La Center, Washington. In 2019, the FBI released a report detailing the burglary of a grocery store, about three hours after Cooper jumped, near Heisson, Washington. Heisson, an unincorporated community, was within the calculated drop zone Northwest Orient Airlines presented to the FBI. In the report, the FBI noted the burglar took only survival items, such as beef jerky and gloves; however, the report also noted the burglar wore "military type boots with a corregated [sic] sole", while Cooper was described as wearing slip-on shoes.

=== Search for ransom money ===
One month after the hijacking, the FBI distributed lists of the ransom serial numbers to financial institutions, casinos, racetracks, businesses with routine transactions involving large amounts of cash and to law-enforcement agencies around the world. Northwest Orient Airlines offered a reward of 15% of the recovered money, to a maximum of $25,000. In early 1972, U.S. Attorney General John N. Mitchell released the serial numbers to the general public. Two men used counterfeit $20 bills printed with Cooper serial numbers to swindle $30,000 from a Newsweek reporter named Karl Fleming in exchange for an interview with a man they falsely claimed was the hijacker.

In early 1973, with the ransom money still missing, The Oregon Journal republished the serial numbers and offered $1,000 (equivalent to $7,253 in 2025) to the first person to turn in a ransom bill to the newspaper or any FBI field office. In Seattle, the Post-Intelligencer made a similar offer with a $5,000 reward. The offers remained in effect until Thanksgiving 1974 although, despite several near matches reported, no genuine bills were found. In 1975, Northwest Orient Airlines's insurer, Global Indemnity Co., complied with an order from the Minnesota Supreme Court and paid the airline's $180,000 (equivalent to $1,100,000 in 2025) claim on the ransom money.

=== Later developments ===
Analysis of the flight data indicated the first estimated location of Cooper's landing zone was inaccurate. Captain Scott—who was flying the aircraft manually because of Cooper's speed and altitude demands—determined the flight path was farther east than initially reported. Additional data provided by Continental Airlines pilot Tom Bohan—who was flying four minutes behind Flight 305—led the FBI to recalculate its estimates for Cooper's drop zone. Bohan observed the FBI's calculations for Cooper's drop zone were based on incorrectly recorded wind direction, and therefore the FBI's estimates were inaccurate.

Based on Bohan's data and subsequent recalculations of the flight path, the FBI determined Cooper's drop zone was probably over the Washougal River watershed. In 1986, FBI Agent Ralph Himmelsbach wrote, "I have to confess, if I were going to look for Cooper... I would head for the Washougal." The Washougal Valley and the surrounding areas were repeatedly searched but no discoveries traceable to the hijacking have been reported, and the FBI believes any remaining physical clues were probably destroyed in the 1980 eruption of Mount St. Helens.

=== Investigation suspended ===
On July 8, 2016, the FBI announced active investigation of the Cooper case was suspended, citing the need to deploy investigative resources and manpower on issues of greater and more urgent priority. Local field offices would continue to accept any legitimate physical evidence, related specifically to the parachutes or to the ransom money. The 66-volume case file compiled during the 45-year course of the investigation is preserved for historical purposes at FBI headquarters in Washington, D.C., and on the FBI website. All of the evidence is open to the public. The crime remains the only documented unsolved case of air piracy in commercial aviation history.

== Physical evidence ==
During their forensic search of the aircraft, FBI agents found four major pieces of evidence, each with a direct physical link to Cooper: a black clip-on tie, a mother-of-pearl tie clip, a hair from Cooper's headrest, and eight filter-tipped Raleigh cigarette butts from the armrest ashtray.

=== Clip-on necktie ===
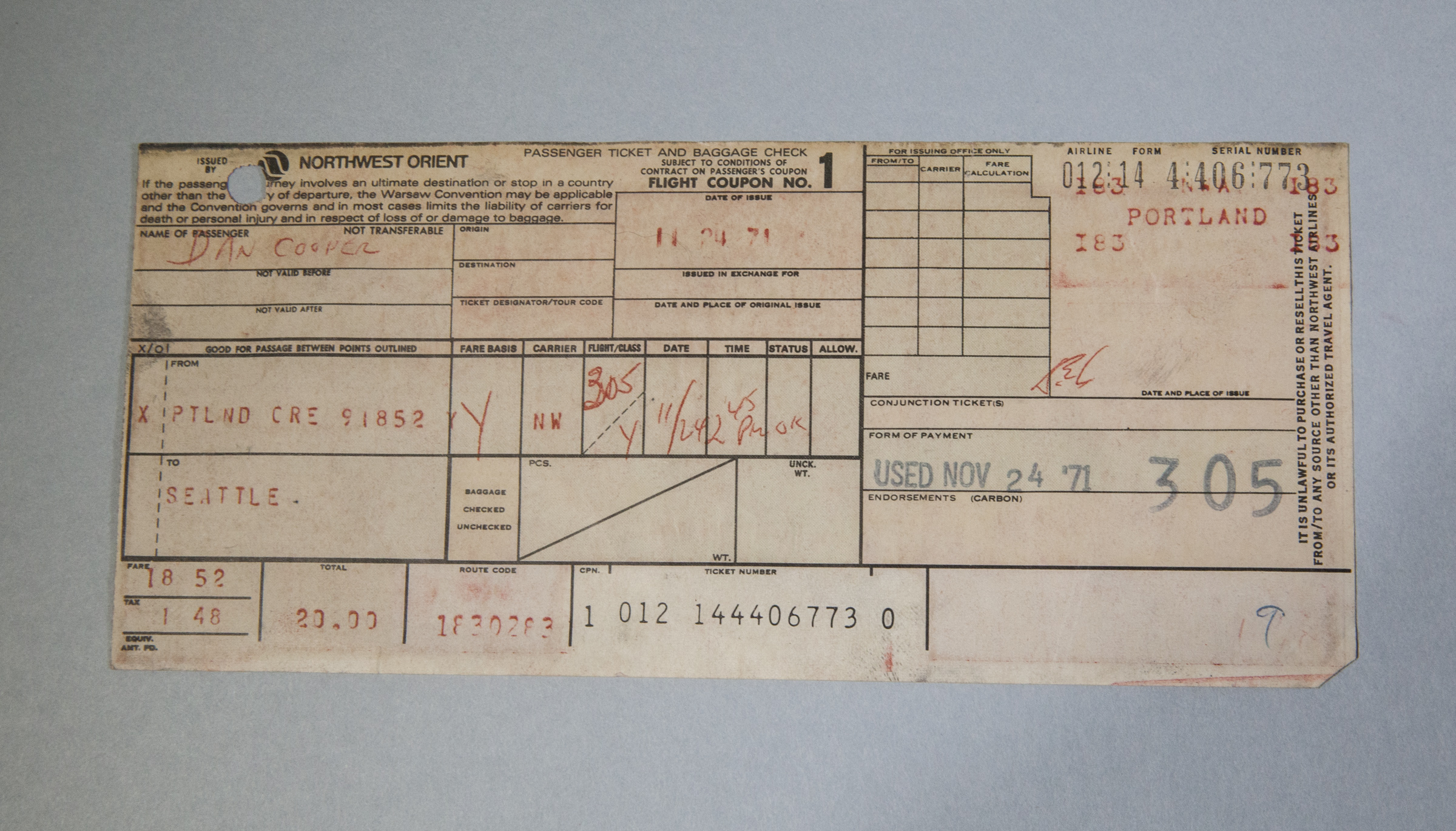
The recovered airline ticket bought by Cooper

FBI agents found a black clip-on necktie in seat 18-E, where Cooper had been seated. Attached to the tie was a gold tie-clip with a circular mother-of-pearl setting in the center of the clip. The FBI determined the tie had been sold exclusively at JCPenney department stores but had been discontinued in 1968. By late 2007, the FBI had built a partial DNA profile from samples found on Cooper's tie in 2001; however, the FBI acknowledged no evidence linked Cooper to the source of the DNA sample. FBI Special Agent Fred Gutt said, "The tie had two small DNA samples, and one large sample ... it's difficult to draw firm conclusions from these samples." The FBI also made public a file of previously unreleased evidence, including Cooper's airline ticket, composite sketches and fact sheets, and posted a request for information about Cooper's identification.

In March 2009, a group of "citizen sleuths" using GPS, satellite imagery and other technologies unavailable in 1971 began reinvestigating components of the case. Known as the Cooper Research Team (CRT), the group included paleontologist Tom Kaye from the Burke Museum of Natural History and Culture in Seattle, scientific illustrator Carol Abraczinskas, computer scientist Sean Christo and metallurgist Alan Stone. Although the CRT obtained little new information about the buried ransom money or Cooper's landing zone, they found, analyzed and identified hundreds of organic and metallic particles on Cooper's tie.

Using electron microscopy, the CRT identified Lycopodium spores, the source of which was likely pharmaceutical. The team also found minute particles of unalloyed titanium on the tie, along with particles of bismuth, antimony, cerium, strontium sulfide, aluminum and titanium-antimony alloys.

In a 2024 reanalysis, Kaye & Rhodes used automated particle analysis using a scanning electron microscope (SEM) and energy-dispersive X-ray spectroscopy to analyze ~180,000 particles on one 12 mm SEM stub (Stub #675) that had been used to sample the Cooper tie. Titanium, titanium–antimony, gold and palladium (originally thought to come from a gold-plated tie clip; palladium is used to bleach gold in white- gold jewelry, but reported jewelry alloys are typically multicomponent Au–Pd–Ag/Cu/Ni/Zn systems rather than simple Au–Pd particles), mercury–silver, uranium-rich, tungsten–cobalt, zirconium-rich, antimony- rich and zircon mineral as well as large numbers of aluminosilicate were found.

The metal and rare-earth particles suggested Cooper may have worked for Boeing or another aeronautical engineering company, at a chemical manufacturing plant or at a metal fabrication and production facility.

The material with the most significance, explained Kaye, was the unalloyed titanium. During the 1970s, the use of pure titanium was extremely rare and specialized, and would only be used in aircraft fabrication facilities, or at chemical companies combining titanium and aluminum to store extremely corrosive substances. Cerium and strontium sulfide were used by Boeing's supersonic transport development project and by Portland factories in which cathode ray tubes were manufactured, such as Teledyne and Tektronix. Cooper researcher Eric Ulis has speculated the titanium-antimony alloys are linked to Rem-Cru Titanium Inc., a metals manufacturer and Boeing contractor.

=== Hair samples ===
FBI agents found two hair samples in Cooper's seat: a single strand of limb hair on the seat, and a single strand of brown Caucasian head hair on the headrest. The limb hair was destroyed after the FBI Crime Laboratory determined the sample lacked enough unique microscopic characteristics to be useful; however, the FBI Crime Laboratory determined the head hair was suitable for future comparison, and preserved the hair on a microscope slide. During their attempts to build Cooper's DNA profile in 2002, the FBI discovered the hair sample had been lost.

=== Cigarette butts ===
In the armrest ashtray of seat 18-E, FBI agents found eight Raleigh filter-tipped cigarette butts. The butts were sent to the FBI Crime Laboratory, but investigators were unable to find fingerprints and returned the butts to the Las Vegas field office. In 1998, the FBI sought to extract DNA from the cigarette butts, but discovered the butts had been destroyed while in the custody of the Las Vegas field office.

=== Recovered ransom money ===
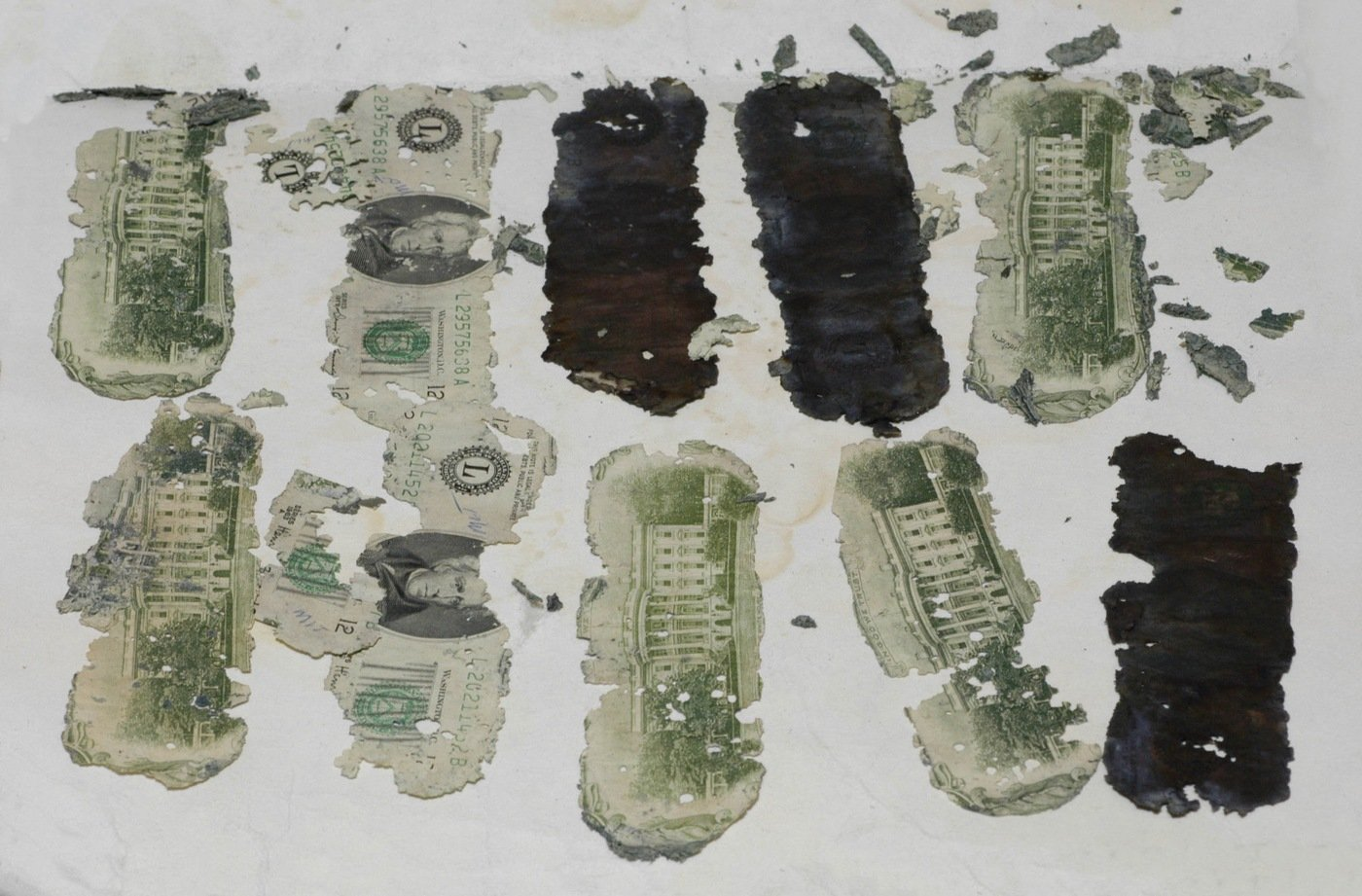
Portion of Brian Ingram's 1980 discovery

On February 10, 1980, eight-year-old Brian Ingram was vacationing with his family on the Columbia River at a beachfront known as Tina (or Tena) Bar, about 9 miles (14 km) downstream from Vancouver, Washington, and 20 miles (32 km) south west of Ariel. As he raked the sandy riverbank to build a campfire, he uncovered three packets of the ransom cash, totaling $6,000. The bills had disintegrated from lengthy exposure to the elements, but were still bundled in rubber bands. FBI technicians confirmed the money was a portion of the ransom: two packets of one-hundred $20 bills each and a third packet of ninety, all arranged in the same order as when given to Cooper.

The discovery caused new conjecture and ultimately raised more questions than it answered. Initial statements by investigators and scientific consultants were founded on the assumption the bundled bills washed freely into the Columbia River from one of its many connecting tributaries. A hydrologist from the U.S. Army Corps of Engineers observed the bills had disintegrated in a "rounded" fashion and were "matted together", indicating they "had been deposited by river action" as opposed to having been buried deliberately. The finding supported the hypothesis Cooper had landed near the Washougal River, which merges with the Columbia upstream from the discovery site, and not in or near Lake Merwin, the Lewis River or any of its tributaries feeding the Columbia River downstream from Tina Bar.

The "free-floating" hypothesis neither explained the 10 bills missing from one packet, nor explained how the three packets remained together after separating from the rest of the money. Physical evidence was incompatible with geological evidence; Himmelsbach wrote free-floating bundles would have washed up on the bank "within a couple of years" of the hijacking; otherwise, the rubber bands would have long since deteriorated. Geological evidence suggested the bills arrived at Tina Bar after 1974, when the Army Corps of Engineers performed a dredging operation on a nearby section of the river. Geologist Leonard Palmer of Portland State University found two distinct layers of sand and sediment between the clay deposited on the riverbank by the dredge and the sand layer in which the bills were buried, indicating the bills arrived long after dredging had been completed.

In 1986, after protracted negotiations, the recovered bills were divided equally between Brian Ingram and Northwest Orient Airlines's insurer, Royal Globe Insurance; the FBI retained 14 examples as evidence. Ingram sold 15 of his bills at auction in 2008 for about $37,000 (equivalent to $55,000 in 2025). The Columbia River ransom money remains the only confirmed physical evidence from the hijacking found outside the aircraft.

In late 2020, analysis of diatoms found on the bills suggests the bundles found at Tina Bar were not submerged in the river or buried dry at the time of the hijacking in November 1971. Only diatoms that bloom during springtime were found, indicating the money had entered the water at least several months after the hijacking.

=== Parachutes ===
During the hijacking, Cooper demanded and was given two main parachutes and two reserve parachutes. The two reserve (front) parachutes were supplied by a local skydiving school and the two main (back) parachutes were supplied by a local pilot, Norman Hayden. Earl Cossey, the parachute rigger who packed all four parachutes brought to Cooper, described the two main parachutes as military-style non-steerable emergency bailout parachutes (as opposed to steerable sport parachutes used by skydivers) rigged to deploy immediately when the ripcord was pulled.

When the aircraft landed in Reno, FBI agents discovered two parachutes Cooper left behind: one reserve (front) parachute and one main (back) parachute. The reserve parachute had been opened and three shroud lines had been cut out, but the main parachute left behind was intact. The unused main parachute was described by FBI agents as a Model NB6 (Navy Backpack 6) and is on display at the Washington State Historical Society Museum.

One of the two reserve (front) parachutes Cooper was given was an unusable training parachute intended to only be used for classroom demonstrations. According to Cossey, the reserve parachute's internal canopy was sewn together so skydiving students learn the feeling of pulling a ripcord on a packed parachute without the canopy actually deploying. The non-functional reserve parachute was not found in the aircraft when it landed in Reno, so FBI agents speculated Cooper was an inexperienced parachutist who failed to realize the reserve parachute was a dummy.

Within days of the hijacking, the FBI revealed the parachute harnesses given to Cooper lacked the D-rings required to attach reserve parachutes. Although Cooper could not attach the "dummy" reserve parachute to his main harness, the dummy chute was not found in the airplane and was never found. Cossey speculated Cooper removed the sewn-together canopy and used the empty reserve container as an extra money bag. Cossey's speculation was confirmed by flight attendant Tina Mucklow, who testified she saw Cooper packing money inside a parachute container.

In November 1978, a deer hunter found a Boeing 727's instruction placard for lowering the aft airstair. The placard was found near a logging road about 13 miles (21 km) east of Castle Rock, Washington, north of Lake Merwin, but within Flight 305's basic flight path.

== Theories, hypotheses and conjecture ==
During the 45-year span of its active investigation, the FBI periodically made public some of its working hypotheses and tentative conclusions, based on witness testimony and the scarce physical evidence.

=== Sketches ===
During the first year of the investigation, the FBI used eyewitness testimony from the passengers and flight crew to develop sketches of Cooper. An initial sketch was created on November 25 by Roy Rose, the FBI's chief artist, using only written descriptions. Though flight attendants Tina Mucklow and Alice Hancock believed it to be a good likeness, Florence Schaffner was adamant that it was a poor likeness of the hijacker. Rose was then flown to Minneapolis where, on November 27, he met with the three flight attendants and developed the sketch titled Composite A.

On November 30, the sketch was modified to show Cooper's eyes. Flight attendant Tina Mucklow said the Composite A sketch looked, "almost 100% like [Cooper]." Schaffner told agents she liked the drawing "very much." Hancock said the sketch was a "fair resemblance". Gate agent Hal Williams, who took Cooper's ticket at the boarding gate, said Composite A was "very good, overall", but said the nose and face were "slightly too thin". Bill Mitchell, who sat across from Cooper, said the sketch was good from the mouth up, but felt the sketch made Cooper look too young.

Other passengers were more critical of the sketch, with passengers Robert Gregory and George Labisonniere believing the nose and other facial features should be broadened. Gregory also said the sketch failed to accurately show Cooper's ethnic background, which he believed was partially Mexican-American or Native American. Gregory was so convinced of his memory on that account that he cut out images of people of Latin ethnicity from a National Geographic magazine and sent these clippings to the FBI to illustrate those ethnic features that Cooper possessed. Author Max Gunther, in his 1985 book, "D.B Cooper: What Really Happened", wrote that the sketch looked like "Bing Crosby in a seizure of profound boredom." This description led to the sketch being colloquially named "Bing".

Throughout much of 1972, agents were troubled at the amount of time they were wasting on leads concerning individuals who were too fair-skinned or too young, and decided that a revision of the sketch was in order. Completed in late 1972, this new sketch was titled Composite B and was intended to more accurately depict Cooper's age and skin tone and received mixed reviews from witnesses. Tina Mucklow stated that she preferred the original sketch over this new revision and believed that it "definitely was not a good similarity" to Cooper. However, Florence Schaffner liked the sketch, claiming it was a "fairly good likeness" of Cooper and an improvement over the previous sketch, but desired that the face be narrower and the chin more pointed. Alice Hancock also believed it to be an improvement over the previous sketch, although she told agents that the individual in the sketch looked "coarse" and like a "hoodlum-type", which she did not consider Cooper to be. The passenger eyewitnesses were mostly positive about it, but like Hancock felt that he looked too "angry" or "nasty".

Using these criticisms of Composite B, artist Roy Rose continued making adjustments to it and on January 2, 1973, the FBI created a final version of Composite B. Of the new sketch, Tina Mucklow said it was "a very close resemblance" to the hijacker. Florence Schaffner opined that "the hijacker would be easily recognized from this sketch." In April 1973, the FBI concluded the revised Composite B sketch was the best likeness of Cooper they could develop given the passage of time and fading memories of the eyewitnesses, and should be considered the definitive sketch of Cooper.

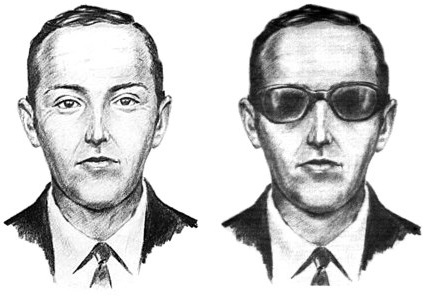
Composite sketch A, November 1971

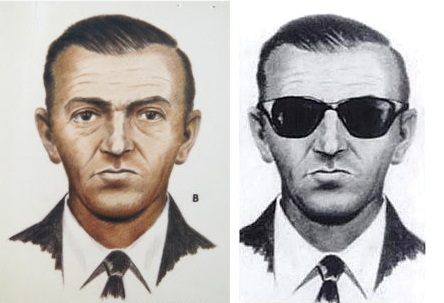
Composite sketch B, late 1972

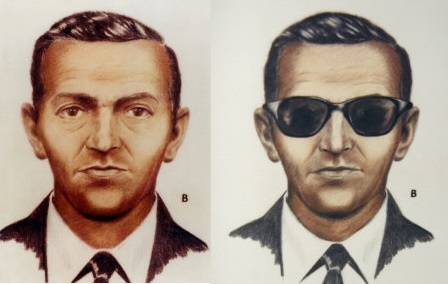
Revised composite sketch B, winter 1972–1973

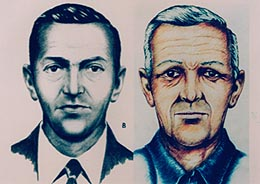
Composite sketch showing an age-progressed Cooper

=== Suspect profiling ===
Flight attendants Schaffner and Mucklow, who spent the most time interacting with Cooper, were interviewed on the same night in separate cities and gave nearly identical descriptions: a man in his mid-forties, approximately 5 feet 10 inches (1.78 m) to 6 feet 0 inches (1.83 m) tall and 170 to 180 pounds (77 to 82 kg), with olive-toned skin, brown eyes, short combed-back black hair and no discernible accent. University of Oregon student Bill Mitchell, who sat across from Cooper during the three-hour flight, gave the FBI several interviews and provided detailed descriptions of Cooper for what subsequently became Composite Sketch B.

Mitchell's descriptions of Cooper were similar to those provided by the flight attendants, except Mitchell described Cooper as 5 feet 9 inches (1.75 m) to 5 feet 10 inches (1.78 m). Since Mitchell was 6 feet 2 inches (1.88 m) tall, he described himself as "way bigger" than Cooper and referred to Cooper as "slight". Robert Gregory, one of the only other passengers besides Mitchell who provided the FBI with a full description of Cooper, also described him as 5 feet 9 inches (1.75 m) tall. Gregory stated he believed Cooper to be of Mexican American or Native American descent. In May 1973, the FBI internally released an eight-page suspect profile of Cooper. The profile suggested Cooper was a military-trained parachutist and not a sports skydiver: in addition to his familiarity with the military parachutes with which he was provided, Cooper's age would have made him an outlier in the sport-skydiving community and would have increased the likelihood of being recognized by a club member. Multiple eyewitnesses cited Cooper's athletic build, so the FBI profile suggested Cooper probably exercised regularly despite his age.

FBI profilers suspected Cooper was a U.S. Air Force veteran familiar with Seattle and the surrounding areas. Cooper recognized Tacoma as the jet circled Puget Sound, and in his conversation with Mucklow, Cooper correctly observed McChord Air Force Base's proximity to Sea-Tac, a detail with which most civilians would be unfamiliar. Cooper's mannerisms—such as his vocabulary, planning, his thorough retrieval of evidence and his use of aviation terminology—led the FBI to conclude he was not a common criminal: Cooper was clearly intelligent, not impulsive or easily rattled, a careful and procedure-oriented planner, adept at anticipating contingencies and adaptive strategies, with meticulous and methodical tendencies. Profilers also cited Cooper's ability to quickly and competently adapt to various situations as they arose, indicating he probably preferred to work independently and neither needed nor wanted an accomplice. Cooper's financial situation was probably desperate. According to Himmelsbach, extortionists and other criminals who steal large amounts of money nearly always do so because they need it urgently; otherwise, the crime is not worth the considerable risk. The FBI considered—but ultimately dismissed—the possibility Cooper was a "thrill seeker" who made the jump "just to prove it could be done".

Because Cooper spilled the only drink he was served and never requested another, the FBI theorized Cooper was neither a heavy drinker nor an alcoholic. Moreover, an alcoholic would likely have been incapable of refusing further alcoholic beverages throughout the stressful and lengthy hijacking. By calculating the number of cigarettes Cooper smoked throughout the hijacking, the FBI believed Cooper smoked about one pack of cigarettes a day. FBI investigators theorized the hijacker's "Dan Cooper" alias was taken from the popular French-language Dan Cooper Belgian comic book series. In the comics, Dan Cooper is a fictional Royal Canadian Air Force test pilot; one comic book cover depicts Dan Cooper skydiving. Because Dan Cooper comics were neither translated to English nor imported to the United States, FBI investigators speculated the hijacker spoke fluent French and encountered the comics during a European tour of duty. Since the Dan Cooper comic series circulated in Quebec, investigators further speculated the hijacker was French Canadian, since many Quebec natives speak English with no discernible accent. Additionally, Cooper's unusual phrasing of "negotiable American currency," suggested his background was not American.

=== Strategy, knowledge, and planning ===
Based on the evidence and Cooper's tactics, the FBI speculated Cooper planned the hijacking carefully and strategically, using detailed, specific knowledge of aviation, the local terrain, and the Boeing 727's capabilities. Cooper was also specific, meticulous, and thorough, indicating he had contingencies planned and could adapt his plans if needed.

Cooper chose a seat in the last row of the rear cabin for three reasons: to observe and respond to any action in front of him, to minimize the possibility of being approached or attacked by someone behind him, and to make himself less conspicuous to the rest of the passengers. To ensure he would not be deliberately supplied with sabotaged equipment, Cooper demanded four parachutes to force the assumption he might compel one or more hostages to jump with him. Himmelsbach observed that Cooper's choice of a bomb—instead of other weapons previously used by hijackers—thwarted any multidirectional attempts to rush him.

Cooper was careful to avoid leaving evidence. Before he jumped, Cooper demanded Mucklow return to him all notes either written by him, or on his behalf. Mucklow said she used the last match in his paper matchbook to light one of his cigarettes, and when she attempted to dispose of the empty matchbook, he demanded she return it to him. Although Cooper meticulously attempted to retrieve evidence, he left his clip-on tie in his seat.

Cooper was clearly familiar with the Boeing 727's capabilities and confidential features, but the aircraft's design was the primary reason Cooper chose the aircraft. With its aft airstair and the placement of its three engines, the 727 was one of the only passenger jets from which a parachute jump could be easily made. Mucklow told the FBI that Cooper appeared to be familiar with the 727's typical refueling time and procedures. By specifying a 15° flap setting, Cooper displayed specific knowledge of aviation tactics and the Boeing 727's capabilities. Unlike most commercial jet airliners, the 727 could remain in slow, low-altitude flight without stalling. The flap setting Cooper specifically requested allowed him to control the 727's airspeed and altitude without entering the cockpit, where he could have been overpowered by the three pilots. First Officer Rataczak, who spoke with Cooper on the intercom during the hijacking, told the FBI, "[Cooper] displayed a specific knowledge of flying and aircraft in general."

The most significant knowledge Cooper displayed was a feature both secret and unique to the 727: the aft airstair could be operated during flight, and the single activation switch in the rear of the cabin could not be overridden from the cockpit. Cooper knew how to operate the airstair, and had clearly planned to use it for his escape. The FBI speculated Cooper knew the Central Intelligence Agency (CIA) was using 727s to drop agents and supplies into enemy territory during the Vietnam War. Since no situation on a passenger flight would necessitate such an operation, civilian crews were neither informed the airstair could be lowered mid-flight, nor were they aware its operation could not be overridden from the cockpit.

Cooper appeared to be familiar with parachutes, although his experience level is unknown. Mucklow said Cooper "appeared to be completely familiar with the parachutes which had been furnished to him", and told a journalist that "Cooper put on [his] parachute as though he did so every day." Based on Cooper's familiarity with the military-style parachutes he was given, FBI investigators have speculated Cooper was a military parachutist and not a civilian skydiver. Larry Carr, who directed the investigative team from 2006 to 2009, does not believe Cooper was a paratrooper. Instead, Carr speculates Cooper had been an Air Force aircraft cargo loader, a job which would provide him with aviation knowledge and experience: cargo loaders have basic jump training, wear emergency parachutes, and know how to dispatch items from planes in flight. As a cargo loader, Cooper would be familiar with parachutes, "but not necessarily sufficient knowledge to survive the jump he made."

=== Cooper's fate ===
An animation of the Boeing 727's rear airstair deploying in flight, with Cooper jumping off: The gravity-operated apparatus remained open until the aircraft landed.

The FBI has never stated an official position regarding Cooper's fate. Agents who worked on the investigation have mixed opinions.

J. Earl Milnes, the special agent in charge of the Seattle FBI Office at the time of the hijacking, believed Cooper survived. In a 1976 interview, Milnes cited three reasons he thought Cooper "got away with it." First, said Milnes, the 727 was a safe airliner from which to jump. Second, the area between Woodland and Vancouver into which Cooper jumped "features wide open spaces, ideal for parachute landings". Third, Milnes believed the weather conditions were adequate for a safe parachute jump.

In October 1976, another senior FBI agent from the Seattle office, speaking anonymously, opined in The Seattle Times, "I think [Cooper] made it. I think he slept in his own bed that night. It was a clear night. A lot of the country is pretty flat... he could have just walked out. Right down the road. Hell, they weren't even looking for him there at the time. They thought he was somewhere else. He could just walk down the road."

Initially, FBI agent Ralph Himmelsbach was dubious of Cooper's chances, but the survival of all five Cooper copycats caused Himmelsbach to revise his estimate to a 50 percent chance of survival. In his 1986 book, NORJAK, Himmelsbach cited three copycats in particular who influenced his opinion: Martin McNally, Frederick Hahneman and Richard LaPoint. (Note: Himmelsbach & Worcester 1986, p. 79: "The similarities to the Cooper case were striking, and immediately raised doubts about the basic premise I had held from early in the investigation: Cooper most likely died in the jump.") McNally jumped with just a front reserve parachute, without protective gear, at night, over Indiana. Unlike Cooper, who appeared to be familiar with parachutes, McNally had to be shown how to put on his parachute. Additionally, McNally's pilot increased the airspeed to 320 knots (590 km/h), nearly twice the airspeed of Flight 305 at the time of Cooper's jump. This speed created a violent jump, causing the money bag containing $500,000 to be ripped away from McNally, "yet he had landed unharmed except for some superficial scratches and bruises." (Note: Himmelsbach & Worcester 1986, p. 79: "Like Cooper, he had not asked for a jump suit or any other protective gear, yet had landed unharmed except for some superficial scratches and bruises.") Hahneman hijacked a 727 in Pennsylvania and survived after jumping at night into a Honduran jungle. The third copycat, LaPoint, hijacked a 727 in Nevada. Wearing only trousers, a shirt, and cowboy boots, LaPoint jumped into the freezing January wind over Northern Colorado and landed in the snow.

Other FBI agents believe Cooper did not survive. In 1980, Thomas Manning, the agent who directed all ground searches in 1971 and 1972, told a journalist he believed Cooper became incapacitated from the freezing wind during the descent, landed in the near-freezing water of Lake Merwin, and drowned when he could not extricate himself from the weight of his parachute. Manning believed Cooper's body was never found because the parachute shroud lines became snagged among the numerous logs on the lake's bottom.

In 2007, case agent Larry Carr cited several reasons why he believed Cooper did not survive the jump. First, Cooper appeared to lack the necessary skydiving knowledge, skills, and experience for the type of jump he attempted. "We originally thought Cooper was an experienced jumper, perhaps even a paratrooper," said Carr, adding, "we concluded after a few years this was simply not true. No experienced parachutist would have jumped in the pitch-black night, in the rain, with a 172 mph [77 m/s] wind in his face wearing loafers and a trench coat. It was simply too risky." However, skydiving instructor Earl Cossey, who packed the parachutes, advised the FBI that Cooper would not have needed extensive experience to survive the jump and "anyone who had six or seven practice jumps could accomplish this." Though Cossey believed Cooper survived, Cossey believed jumping at night drastically increased the risk of injury, and without jump boots Cooper would probably have suffered severe ankle or leg injuries upon landing.

Second, Carr noted Cooper did not appear to have the necessary equipment for either his jump or his survival in the woods. Cooper neither brought nor requested a helmet, and jumped into a 15 °F (−9 °C) wind at 10,000 feet (3,000 m) in November over Washington without proper protection against the extreme wind chill. However, because Cooper was alone in the back of the plane for over half an hour before jumping, what Cooper wore and what equipment he carried when he jumped remains unknown. In addition to his attaché case, Cooper carried a paper bag witnesses described as approximately four inches tall and slightly smaller (while lying flat) than the width and length of the case. Because Cooper did not use the contents of the bag during any part of the hijacking, the FBI speculated the bag may have contained equipment for his jump, such as boots, gloves, and goggles.

Third, Carr believed Cooper did not have an accomplice waiting on the ground to help him escape. Such an arrangement would have required both a precisely timed jump and the flight crew's cooperation to follow a predetermined flight path, but Cooper did not provide a specific flight path to the crew. Moreover, when the flight crew proposed—and Cooper agreed—to alter the flight path and fly from Seattle to Reno for refueling, Cooper had no way of keeping an accomplice apprised of his changed plans. The low cloud cover and lack of visibility to the ground further complicated Cooper's ability to determine his location, establish a bearing, or see his landing zone.

Finally, Carr noted the ransom money never returned to circulation, indicating the money was never spent. Said Carr, "Diving into the wilderness without a plan, without the right equipment, in such terrible conditions, he probably never even got his chute open." Former FBI agent Richard Tosaw theorized Cooper landed in the Columbia River and drowned. Tosaw's belief led him to spend a considerable amount of his own wealth conducting various search operations along the bottom of the Columbia throughout the 1980s.

By 1976, most published legal analyses concurred the impending expiration of the statute of limitations for prosecution of the hijacker would make little difference. Since the statute's interpretation varies from case to case and from court to court, a prosecutor could argue Cooper had forfeited legal immunity on any of several valid technical grounds. In November 1976, a Portland grand jury returned an indictment in absentia against "John Doe, a.k.a. Dan Cooper" for air piracy and violation of the Hobbs Act. The indictment formally enabled prosecution to be continued, should the hijacker be apprehended at any time in the future.

== Suspects ==
Between 1971 and 2016, the FBI processed more than 1,000 "serious suspects", including assorted publicity seekers and deathbed confessors.

=== Ted Braden ===
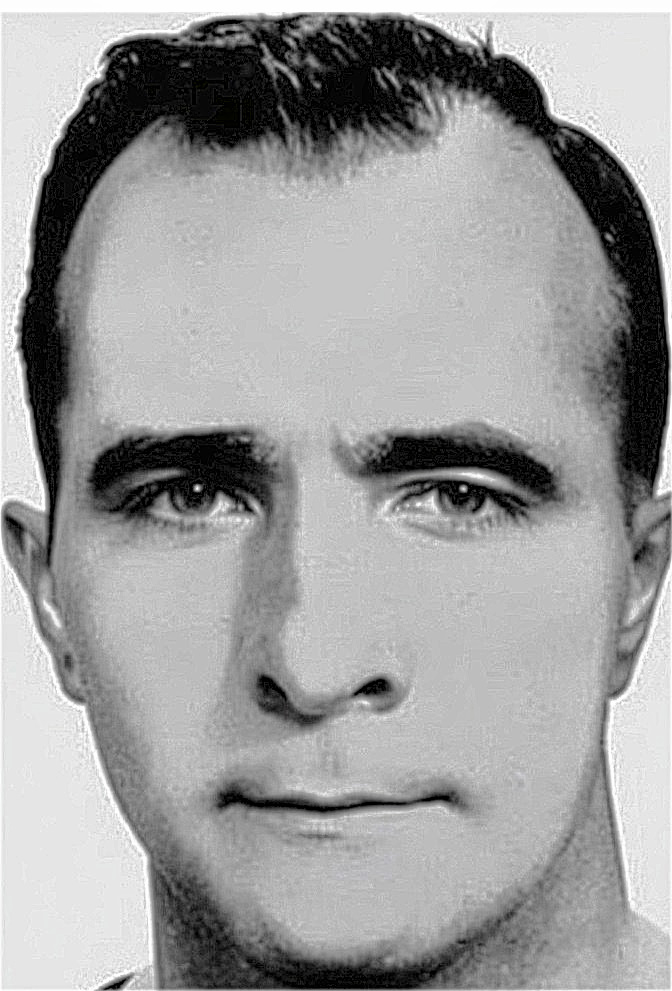
Braden's military identification card photo

Theodore Burdette Braden Jr. (1928–2007) was a U.S. Special Forces commando during the Vietnam War, master skydiver and convicted felon. He was believed by many within the special forces community, both at the time of the hijacking and during subsequent years, to have been Cooper. Born in Ohio, Braden first joined the military in 1944 at the age of 16, serving with the 101st Airborne during World War II. He eventually became one of the military's best parachutists, often representing the U.S. Army Air Force in international skydiving tournaments, and his military records list him as having made 911 jumps. During the 1960s, Braden was a team leader within the Military Assistance Command, Vietnam – Studies and Observations Group (MACVSOG), a classified commando unit of Green Berets which performed unconventional warfare operations in Vietnam. He also served as a military skydiving instructor, teaching high-altitude military parachuting jumping techniques to members of Project DELTA. Braden spent 23 months in Vietnam, conducting classified operations within both North and South Vietnam, as well as Laos and Cambodia.

In December 1966, Braden deserted his unit in Vietnam and made his way to the Congo to serve as a mercenary, but only stayed there a brief time before being arrested by CIA agents and taken back to the US for a court-martial. Despite having committed a capital offense by deserting in wartime, Braden was given an honorable discharge and prohibited from re-enlisting in the military in exchange for his continued secrecy about the MACVSOG program. Braden was profiled in the October 1967 issue of Ramparts magazine, wherein he was described by fellow special forces veteran and journalist Donald W. Duncan as being someone with a "secret death wish" who "continually places himself in unnecessary danger but always seems to get away with it", specifically referring to Braden's disregard for military skydiving safety regulations. Duncan also claimed that during Braden's time in Vietnam, he was "continuously involved in shady deals to make money".

Little is known of Braden's life after his 1967 discharge; at the time of the hijacking he was a truck driver for Consolidated Freightways, which was headquartered in Vancouver, Washington, just across the Columbia River from Portland and not far from Cooper's suspected drop zone in Ariel, Washington. It is also known that he was investigated but never charged by the FBI in the early 1970s for stealing $250,000 in a trucking scam he had allegedly devised. In 1980, Braden was indicted by a federal grand jury for driving an 18-wheeler full of stolen goods from Arizona to Massachusetts; it is unknown whether there was a conviction in that case. Braden was arrested in Pennsylvania two years later for driving a stolen vehicle with fictitious plates and for having no driver's license. Braden was eventually sent to federal prison during the late 1980s, serving time in Pennsylvania, although the precise crime is unknown.

Despite his ability as a soldier, Braden was not well liked personally and was described by a family member as "the perfect combination of high intelligence and criminality". From his time working covert operations in Vietnam, he likely would have possessed the then-classified knowledge about the ability and proper specifications for jumping from a Boeing 727, perhaps actually having done it on MACVSOG missions. Physically, Braden's military records list him at 5 ft 8 in (173 cm), which is shorter than the height description of at least 5 ft 10 in (178 cm) given by the two flight attendants, but this military measurement would have been taken in his stocking feet and he may have appeared somewhat taller in shoes. Braden possessed a dark complexion from years of outdoor military service, had short dark hair, a medium athletic build and was 43 years of age at the time of the hijacking, which are features all in line with the descriptions of Cooper.

=== Fred Catalano ===
Fred Catalano (1935–2006) was a trained pilot who was working at the time of the hijacking as a purser for TWA. Catalano's name was submitted to the FBI after the bureau requested that airlines provide any information regarding employees or former employees who might be considered logical suspects. Catalano was described as a “rebel” by his TWA supervisors and was suspended many times for breaking company rules and regulations. He was also noted as suffering from money troubles. Though he was normally based out of the Los Angeles area, he was living in Eugene, Oregon, when the hijacking occurred. Upon investigation, the FBI could not determine his whereabouts between the dates of November 22 and November 28. Passenger Robert Gregory picked Catalano's photo from a lineup as having a very strong resemblance to Cooper, specifically noting Catalano's dark complexion and high cheekbones. By 2004, Catalano was one of the few suspects whom the FBI had yet to eliminate, prompting them to seek out a DNA sample for testing. However, there is no indication within the FBI's investigative files that they were able to obtain Catalano's DNA before his death in 2006.

=== Kenneth Christiansen ===
In 2003, Minnesota resident Lyle Christiansen watched a television documentary about the Cooper hijacking and became convinced that his late brother Kenneth (1926–1994) was Cooper. After repeated futile attempts to convince the FBI as well as author and movie director Nora Ephron (who he hoped would make a movie about the case), Lyle contacted private investigator Skipp Porteous in New York City. In 2010, Porteous published a book postulating that Christiansen was the hijacker. The next year, an episode of the History channel series Brad Meltzer's Decoded summarized the circumstantial evidence linking Kenneth Christiansen to the Cooper case.

Christiansen enlisted in the U.S. Army in 1944 and was trained as a paratrooper. World War II had ended by the time he was deployed in 1945, but he made occasional training jumps while stationed in Allied-occupied Japan during the late 1940s. After leaving the army, he joined Northwest Orient Airlines in 1954 as a laborer stationed at the company's Far East stopover on Shemya Island in the Aleutians. He subsequently became a flight attendant, and then a purser, based in Seattle.

Christiansen was 45 years old at the time of the hijacking, but he was shorter (5 ft 8 in or 173 cm) and thinner (150 pounds or 68 kg) than eyewitness descriptions of Cooper. Christiansen smoked (as did the hijacker) and displayed a fondness for bourbon, the drink Cooper had requested. Cabin crew member Florence Schaffner told author Geoffrey Gray that photos of Christiansen fitted her memory of the hijacker's appearance more closely than those of the other suspects she had been shown but added that she could not conclusively identify him. Despite the publicity generated by Porteous's book and the television documentary, the FBI maintains that Christiansen cannot be considered a prime suspect. It cites the poor match to eyewitness physical descriptions and a complete absence of direct incriminating evidence.

=== Jack Coffelt ===
Bryant "Jack" Coffelt (1917–1975) was a con man, ex-convict and purported government informant who claimed to have been the chauffeur and confidant of Abraham Lincoln's last undisputed descendant, great-grandson Robert Todd Lincoln Beckwith. In 1972, Coffelt began claiming he was Cooper and attempted through an intermediary – a former cellmate named James Brown – to sell his story to a Hollywood production company. Coffelt claimed he had landed near Mount Hood, about 50 miles (80 km) south east of Ariel, injuring himself and losing the ransom money in the process. Photos of Coffelt bear a resemblance to the composite drawings, although he was in his mid-50s in 1971. He was reportedly in Portland on the day of the hijacking and sustained leg injuries around that time which were consistent with a skydiving mishap. Coffelt's account was reviewed by the FBI, which concluded that it differed in several details from information that had not been made public and was therefore a fabrication. Brown continued peddling the story long after Coffelt died in 1975. Multiple media venues, including the CBS News program 60 Minutes, considered and rejected the story.

=== Lynn Cooper ===
Lynn Doyle "L. D." Cooper (1931–1999), a leather worker and Korean War veteran, was proposed as a suspect in July 2011 by his niece, Marla Cooper. As an eight-year-old, she recalled Cooper and another uncle planning something "very mischievous", involving the use of "expensive walkie-talkies", at her grandmother's house in Sisters, Oregon, 150 miles (240 km) south east of Portland. The next day, Flight 305 was hijacked; and though the uncles ostensibly were turkey hunting, L. D. Cooper came home wearing a bloody shirt—he said it was the result of an auto accident. Later, Marla claimed her parents came to believe that L. D. was the hijacker. She also recalled that her uncle, who died in 1999, was obsessed with the Canadian comic book hero Dan Cooper and "had one of his comic books thumb-tacked to his wall"—although he was not a skydiver or paratrooper.

In August 2011, New York magazine published an alternative witness sketch, reportedly based on a description by Flight 305 eyewitness Robert Gregory, depicting horn-rimmed sunglasses, a russet-colored suit jacket with wide lapels and marcelled hair. The article observed that L. D. Cooper had wavy hair that looked marcelled (as did Duane Weber). The FBI announced that no fingerprints had been found on a guitar strap made by L. D. Cooper. One week later, they added that his DNA did not match the partial DNA profile obtained from the hijacker's tie, but acknowledged that there is no certainty that the hijacker was the source of the organic material obtained from the tie.

=== William Gossett ===
William Pratt Gossett (1930–2003) was a Marine Corps, Army and Army Air Force veteran who had military service in Korea and Vietnam. His military experience included jump training and wilderness survival. Gossett was known to be obsessed with the Cooper hijacking. According to Galen Cook, a lawyer who has collected information related to Gossett for years, he once showed his sons a key to a safe deposit box in Vancouver, British Columbia, which he claimed contained the long-missing ransom money. The FBI has no direct evidence implicating Gossett and cannot reliably place him in the Pacific north west at the time of the hijacking. Special Agent Carr said: "There is not one link to the D. B. Cooper case, other than the statements [Gossett] made to someone."

=== Joe Lakich ===
Joe Lakich (1921–2017) was a retired US Army Major and Korean War veteran whose daughter Susan Giffe was killed less than two months before the hijacking, as a consequence of a botched hostage negotiation conducted by the FBI. The events culminating in the death of Lakich's daughter would be studied by hostage negotiators for decades as an example of what not to do during a hostage situation. He and his wife later sued the FBI, and ultimately an appeals court ruled in their favor, holding that the FBI acted negligently during the hostage negotiation.

Lakich would become a Cooper suspect in large part due to the revelation that Cooper's tie contained microscopic particles of uncommon metals, such as unalloyed titanium. It is speculated that few people during that era would have contact with such materials, and that Cooper may have worked in a manufacturing environment working on electronics as engineer or manager. When the hijacking occurred, Lakich was working in Nashville as a production supervisor at an electronics capacitor factory and would have likely been exposed to the materials found on the tie. When Cooper was asked by Tina Mucklow why he was committing the hijacking, he replied: "It's not because I have a grudge against your airlines, it's just because I have a grudge." It is believed by some that this "grudge" was Lakich's anger toward the FBI for their failed efforts at rescuing his daughter less than two months earlier.

=== Jason Langseth ===
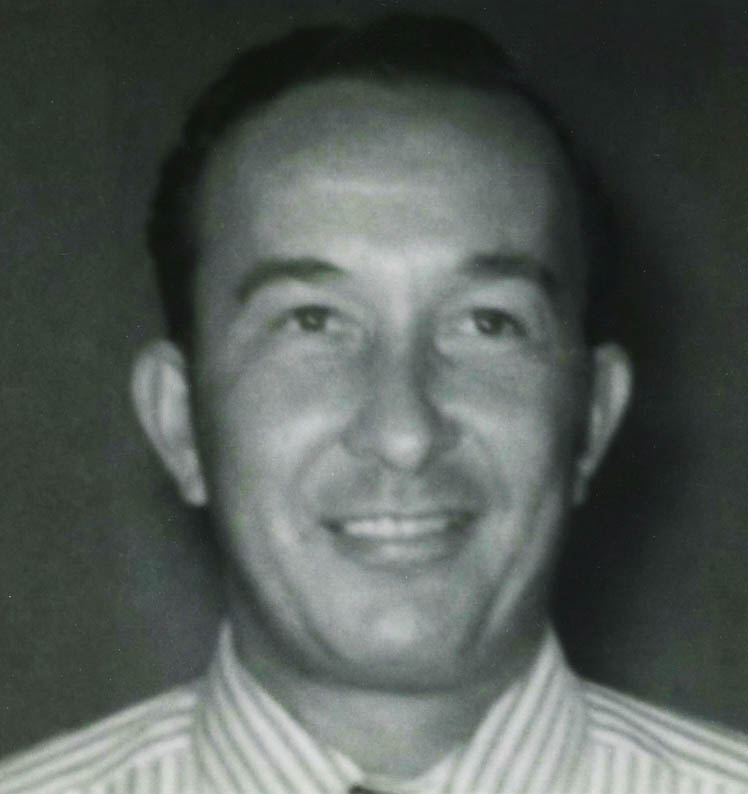
FBI file photo of Jason Langseth, taken in 1971

Jason Thomas Langseth (1934–2009) was a skydiver and Marine Corps veteran of the Korean War. Few Cooper suspects attracted as much FBI attention as Langseth, with investigations conducted against him during parts of three decades. Born in Texas in 1934, Langseth first came under the FBI's radar in February 1972 after multiple informants reported his strong resemblance to the sketch, his skydiving experience, and his criminal proclivities. Agents uncovered that Langseth reportedly spoke of committing the "perfect crime" and was believed to have participated in night skydiving classes in the six months leading up to the hijacking. During one jump, he knocked out several teeth after crashing into a tree. When he was interviewed by agents on February 16, 1972, Langseth claimed he was busy making sales calls in Colorado Springs, Colorado on the day of the hijacking while working as an industrial chemical salesman. To verify his alibi, agents acquired his weekly sales reports from his employer for the week of the hijacking, but discovered that many of the businesses listed were fictitious, and the legitimate businesses had no recollection of Langseth visiting that day. Despite his failed alibi, Langseth was initially dismissed by agents in 1972 in large part because their internal files erroneously listed Langseth's year of birth as 1944, causing them to believe he was too young to be the middle-aged hijacker.

Langseth was brought to the FBI's attention yet again in 1977, when a former associate reported that Langseth was receiving monthly or bi-weekly stipends from the Toronto Dominion Bank in Canada. At that time, the FBI was also made aware of Langseth's actual birth year, making him a more viable suspect among case agents. When agents contacted Langseth again in 1977, he immediately hired an attorney, told the FBI that he did not wish to speak to its investigators and refused their offer to take a polygraph examination to exonerate himself. Then, in 1993, another tipster contacted the FBI after watching an Unsolved Mysteries episode featuring the Cooper hijacking. Like the previous informants, he also remembered Langseth receiving training in night jumps in 1971, as well as Langseth's Canadian bank account.

By the early 2000's, the FBI had still not eliminated Langseth and contacted him in order to obtain a DNA sample. Despite his previous evasiveness, when agents made contact with Langseth in December 2004, he freely offered up a sample of his saliva. When his DNA was compared to the three partial profiles lifted from Cooper's tie, there was no match, and he was officially eliminated by the FBI.

=== Richard McCoy ===
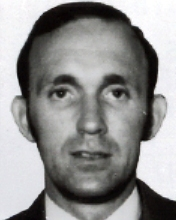
Richard McCoy Jr.

Richard McCoy Jr. (1942–1974) was an army veteran who served two tours of duty in Vietnam, first as a demolition expert and later with the Green Berets as a helicopter pilot. After his military service, he became a warrant officer in the Utah National Guard and an avid recreational skydiver, with aspirations of becoming a Utah State Trooper. On April 7, 1972, McCoy staged the best-known of the copycat hijackings. He boarded United Airlines' Flight 855 (a Boeing 727 with aft stairs) in Denver, Colorado, and brandishing what later proved to be a paperweight resembling a hand grenade and an unloaded pistol, he demanded four parachutes and $500,000. After delivery of the money and parachutes at San Francisco International Airport, McCoy ordered the aircraft back into the sky and bailed out over Provo, Utah, leaving behind his handwritten hijacking instructions and his fingerprints on a magazine he had been reading.

McCoy was arrested on April 9 with the ransom cash in his possession. After trial and conviction, he received a 45-year sentence. Two years later, he escaped from Lewisburg Federal Penitentiary with several accomplices by crashing a garbage truck through the main gate. Tracked down three months later in Virginia Beach, McCoy was killed in a shoot-out with FBI agents. In their 1991 book, D.B. Cooper: The Real McCoy, parole officer Bernie Rhodes and former FBI agent Russell Calame asserted that they had identified McCoy as Cooper. They cited obvious similarities in the two hijackings, claims by McCoy's family that the tie and mother-of-pearl tie clip left on the aircraft belonged to McCoy, and McCoy's own refusal to admit or deny that he was Cooper. A proponent of their claim was the FBI agent who killed McCoy and said, "When I shot Richard McCoy, I shot D. B. Cooper at the same time."

Although there is no reasonable doubt that McCoy committed the Denver hijacking, the FBI does not consider him a suspect in the Cooper case because of mismatches in age and description; McCoy was 29 years old, with projecting ears. Some notable examples, cited by Rhodes and Calame: Cooper's age was estimated by all witnesses as mid-40s, McCoy was 29 years old; most witnesses, including all three flight attendants, said Cooper had "dark brown, piercing" eyes, McCoy's eyes were light blue; Cooper's ears had no distinguishing characteristics, McCoy's ears stuck out so prominently that his nickname was Dumbo, and he wore a scarf to conceal them during the Denver hijacking; Cooper drank bourbon and chain-smoked cigarettes, McCoy was an observant Mormon who did not smoke or drink alcohol; Cooper was described as having a raspy voice with no particular accent, McCoy had a noticeable southern accent, and a marked lisp due to surgical correction of a cleft palate in childhood. McCoy had skydiving skill much greater than thought to be possessed by Cooper, and credible evidence that McCoy was in Las Vegas on the day of the Portland hijacking, and at home in Utah the day after, having Thanksgiving dinner with his family. In addition, the three stewardesses who interacted with Cooper were shown photographs of McCoy and all agreed that he was not their hijacker. They were even able to point to specific differences in the two men, specifically that Cooper's nose was not as broad as McCoy's, that Cooper had more hair than McCoy, and that Cooper's ears did not protrude as much as McCoy's. McCoy's photo was also shown to the ticket agent who sold Cooper his ticket, the gate agent and Bill Mitchell, the passenger seated closest to Cooper, and they too concluded that McCoy and Cooper were not the same. In 2024, McCoy's two children publicly stated that their father had been D. B. Cooper after a parachute was found by YouTuber Dan Gryder on the property formerly owned by McCoy's mother. Gryder claims to have handed this parachute over to the FBI, though the FBI has not confirmed this.

=== Sheridan Peterson ===
The 1971 sketch of Cooper's description, and photo of Peterson from around the same time

Sheridan Peterson (1926–2021) served with the Marine Corps during World War II and was employed later as a technical editor at Boeing, based in Seattle. Investigators became interested in Peterson as a suspect soon after the skyjacking because of his experience as a smokejumper and love of taking physical risks, as well as his similar appearance and age (44) to the Cooper description. His involvement in the civil rights movement and assisting refugees in Vietnam during the Vietnam War could have potentially radicalized him to pursue hijacking.

Peterson often teased the media about whether he was really Cooper. Entrepreneur Eric Ulis, who spent years investigating the crime, said he was "98% convinced" that Peterson was Cooper; when pressed by FBI agents, Peterson insisted he was in Nepal at the time of the hijacking. He died in 2021. In an episode of History channel's History's Greatest Mysteries, analysis of DNA found on the tie worn by Cooper indicated that Peterson was not a match for Cooper when compared to a DNA sample from one of Peterson's living daughters. According to a February 2023 article in The Oregonian, Ulis subsequently abandoned his position that Peterson was Cooper approximately a year prior, after failing to find anyone Peterson knew that could corroborate that Peterson had the smoking habit that Cooper exhibited.

=== Robert Rackstraw ===
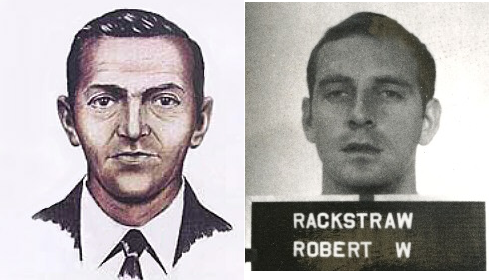
FBI sketch of Cooper from 1972 compared to the 1970 Army ID picture of Rackstraw

Robert Wesley Rackstraw (1943–2019) was a retired pilot and ex-convict who served on an army helicopter crew and other units during the Vietnam War. He came to the attention of the Cooper task force in February 1978, after he was arrested in Iran and deported to the U.S. to face explosives possession and check kiting charges. Several months later, while released on bail, Rackstraw attempted to fake his own death by radioing a false mayday call and telling controllers that he was bailing out of a rented aircraft over Monterey Bay. Police later arrested him in Fullerton, California, on an additional charge of forging federal pilot certificates; the plane he claimed to have ditched was found, repainted, in a nearby hangar. Cooper investigators observed his physical resemblance to Cooper composite sketches even though he was only 28 in 1971, military parachute training, and criminal record but eliminated him as a suspect in 1979 after no direct evidence of his involvement could be found.

In 2016, Rackstraw was featured as a suspect by a History channel program, along with a book. On September 8, 2016, Thomas J. Colbert, the author of the book, and attorney Mark Zaid filed a lawsuit to compel the FBI to release its Cooper case file by the Freedom of Information Act. In 2017, Colbert and a group of volunteer investigators uncovered what they believed to be "a decades-old parachute strap" at an undisclosed location in the Pacific north west. This was followed later in 2017 with a piece of foam, which they suspected was part of Cooper's parachute backpack. In January 2018, Tom and Dawna Colbert reported that they had obtained a confession letter originally written in December 1971 containing codes that matched three units Rackstraw was a part of while in the Army.

One of the Flight 305 flight attendants reportedly "did not find any similarities" between photos of Rackstraw from the 1970s and her recollection of Cooper's appearance. Rackstraw's attorney termed the renewed allegations "the stupidest thing I've ever heard", and Rackstraw himself told People magazine, "It's a lot of [expletive], and they know it is." The FBI declined further comment. Rackstraw stated in a 2017 phone interview that he lost his job over the 2016 investigations. Rackstraw said to Colbert, "I told everybody I was [the hijacker]", before explaining the admission was a stunt. He died in 2019.

=== Walter Reca ===
Walter R. Reca (1933–2014) was a former military paratrooper and intelligence operative. He was proposed as a suspect by his friend Carl Laurin in 2018. In 2008, Reca told Laurin via a recorded telephone call that he was the hijacker. Reca gave Laurin permission in a notarized letter to share his story after his death. He also allowed Laurin to tape their telephone conversations about the crime during a six-week period in late 2008. In over three hours of recordings, Reca shared details about his version of the hijacking. He also confessed to his niece, Lisa Story.

From Reca's description of the terrain on his way to the drop zone, Laurin concluded that he landed near Cle Elum, Washington. After Reca described an encounter with a dump truck driver at a roadside cafe after he landed, Laurin located Jeff Osiadacz, who was driving his dump truck near Cle Elum the night of the hijacking and met a stranger at the Teanaway Junction Café just outside of town. The man asked Osiadacz to give his friend directions to the café by telephone, presumably to be picked up, and he complied. Laurin convinced Joe Koenig, a former member of the Michigan State Police, of Reca's guilt. Koenig later published a book on Cooper, titled Getting The Truth: I Am D.B. Cooper.

These claims have aroused skepticism. Cle Elum is well north and east of Flight 305's known flight path, more than 150 miles (240 km) north of the drop zone assumed by most analysts, and even further from Tina Bar, where a portion of the ransom money was found. Reca was a military paratrooper and private skydiver with hundreds of jumps to his credit, in contradiction to the FBI's publicized profile of an amateur skydiver at best. Reca also did not resemble the composite portrait the FBI assembled, which Laurin and Osiadacz used to explain why Osiadacz's suspicions were not aroused at the time. In response to the allegations against Reca, the FBI said that it would be inappropriate to comment on specific tips provided to them, and that no evidence to date had proved the culpability of any suspect beyond a reasonable doubt.

=== William Smith ===
In November 2018, The Oregonian published an article proposing William J. Smith of Bloomfield, New Jersey, (1928–2018) as a suspect. The article was based on research conducted by an army data analyst who sent his findings to the FBI in mid-2018. Smith, a New Jersey native, was a World War II veteran. After high school, he enlisted with the US Navy and volunteered for combat air crew training. After his discharge, he worked for the Lehigh Valley Railroad and was affected by the Penn Central Transportation Company's bankruptcy in 1970, the largest bankruptcy in US history at that time. The article proposed that the loss of his pension created a grudge against the corporate establishment and transportation field, as well as a sudden need for money. Smith was 43 at the time of the hijacking. In his high school yearbook, a list of alumni killed in World War II lists an Ira Daniel Cooper, possibly the source for the hijacker's pseudonym. The analyst claimed that Smith's naval aviation experience would have given him knowledge of aircraft and parachutes, and his railroad experience would have helped him find railroad tracks and hop on a train to escape the area after landing.

According to the analyst, aluminum spiral chips found on the clip-on tie could have come from a locomotive maintenance facility. Smith's information about the Seattle area may have come from his close friend Dan Clair, who was stationed at Fort Lewis during the war. The analyst observed that the man who claimed to be Cooper in Max Gunther's 1985 book identified himself as "Dan LeClair". Smith and Clair worked together for Conrail at Newark's Oak Island Yard. Smith retired from that facility as a yardmaster. The FBI has stated that it would be inappropriate to comment on tips related to Smith.

=== Duane Weber ===
Duane L. Weber (1924–1995) was a World War II army veteran who served time in at least six prisons from 1945 to 1968 for burglary and forgery. He was proposed as a suspect by his widow, Jo, based primarily on a deathbed confession. Three days before he died in 1995, Weber told his wife, "I am Dan Cooper", but the name meant nothing to her. Months later, a friend told her of its significance in the hijacking. She went to her local library to research Cooper, found Max Gunther's book and discovered notations in the margins in her husband's handwriting. Like the hijacker, Weber drank bourbon and chain-smoked. Other circumstantial evidence included a 1979 trip to Seattle and the Columbia River, where his wife remembered him throwing a trash bag just upstream of Tina Bar.

Himmelsbach said, "[Weber] does fit the physical description [and] does have the criminal background that I have always felt was associated with the case", but did not believe Weber was Cooper. The FBI eliminated Weber as an active suspect in July 1998 when his fingerprints did not match any of those processed in the hijacked plane, and no other direct evidence could be found to implicate him. Later, his DNA also failed to match the samples recovered from Cooper's tie.

== Similar hijackings ==
Cooper was among the first to attempt air piracy for personal gain; 11 days before Cooper's hijack, Canadian Paul Joseph Cini had hijacked an Air Canada DC-8 over Montana, but was overpowered by the crew when he put down his shotgun to strap on his parachute. Encouraged by Cooper's apparent success, 15 similar hijackings (extortion plus request of parachutes)—all unsuccessful (five were able to make the jump and landed safely but were subsequently captured)—out of 31 in total (19 with Cooper's extortion style) were attempted in 1972.

- Richard Charles LaPoint, an Army veteran from Boston, boarded Hughes Airwest Flight 800 at McCarran International Airport in Las Vegas on January 20. Brandishing what he claimed was a bomb while the DC-9 was on the taxiway, he demanded $50,000, two parachutes, and a helmet. After releasing the 51 passengers and two flight attendants, he ordered the aircraft on an eastward trajectory toward Denver, then bailed out over the treeless plains of northeastern Colorado. Authorities, tracking the locator-equipped parachute and his footprints in the snow and mud, apprehended him a few hours later.
- Richard McCoy Jr., a former army Green Beret, hijacked a United Airlines 727-100 on April 7 after it left Denver, diverted it to San Francisco, then bailed out over Utah with $500,000 in ransom money. He landed safely and was arrested two days later.
- Frederick Hahneman used a handgun to hijack an Eastern Air Lines 727 in Allentown, Pennsylvania, on May 7, demanded $303,000, and eventually parachuted into his native Honduras. A month later, with the FBI in pursuit and a $25,000 bounty on his head, he surrendered at the American embassy in Tegucigalpa. After being given a life sentence in September 1972, he was paroled in 1984.
- Robb Heady, a 22-year-old former army paratrooper hijacked United Airlines Flight 239 from Reno to San Francisco on June 2, 1972. Carrying his own parachute and using a .357 (9.07 mm) revolver, he demanded $200,000 in ransom money. He jumped from the aircraft and was captured the next morning.
- Martin McNally, an unemployed service-station attendant, used a submachine gun on June 23 to commandeer an American Airlines 727 en route from St. Louis, Missouri, to Tulsa, Oklahoma, then diverted it eastward to Indiana and bailed out with $500,000 in ransom. McNally lost the ransom money as he exited the aircraft, but landed safely near Peru, Indiana, and was apprehended a few days later in a Detroit suburb. When interviewed in a 2020 podcast retrospective, McNally said he had been inspired by Cooper.

With the advent of universal luggage searches in 1973, the general incidence of hijackings dropped dramatically. There were no further notable Cooper imitators until July 11, 1980, when Glenn K. Tripp seized Northwest Orient Flight 608 at Seattle-Tacoma Airport, demanding $600,000 ($100,000 by an independent account), two parachutes, and the assassination of his boss. A quick-thinking flight attendant drugged Tripp's alcoholic drink with Valium. After a 10-hour stand-off, during which Tripp reduced his demands to three cheeseburgers and a ground vehicle in which to escape, he was apprehended. Tripp attempted to hijack the same Northwest flight on January 21, 1983, and this time demanded to be flown to Afghanistan. When the aircraft landed in Portland, he was shot and killed by FBI agents.

== Aftermath ==
=== Airport security ===
Despite the initiation of the federal Sky Marshal program the previous year, 31 hijackings were committed in U.S. airspace in 1972; 19 of them were for the specific purpose of extorting money. In 15 of the extortion cases, the hijackers also demanded parachutes. In early 1973, the FAA began requiring airlines to search all passengers and their bags. Amid multiple lawsuits charging that such searches violated Fourth Amendment protections against search and seizure, federal courts ruled that they were acceptable when applied universally and when limited to searches for weapons and explosives. Only two hijackings were attempted in 1973, both by psychiatric patients; one hijacker, Samuel Byck, intended to crash the airliner into the White House to kill President Nixon.

=== Aircraft modifications ===
Due to multiple copycat hijackings in 1972, the FAA required that the exterior of all Boeing 727 aircraft be fitted with a spring-loaded device, later dubbed the "Cooper vane", that prevents lowering of the aft airstair during flight. The device consists of a flat blade of aluminum mounted on a pivot, which is spring-loaded to stay out of the way of the door when the craft is at rest, but aerodynamically rotates into position to prevent the door from being opened when the aircraft is traveling at flight speeds. Operation of the vane is automatic and cannot be overridden from within the aircraft. As a direct result of the hijacking, the installation of peepholes was mandated in all cockpit doors; this enables the cockpit crew to observe passengers without opening the cockpit door.

=== Subsequent history of N467US ===
In 1978, the hijacked 727-100 aircraft was sold by Northwest Orient to Piedmont Airlines, where it was re-registered N838N and continued in domestic carrier service. In 1984, it was purchased by the charter company Key Airlines, re-registered N29KA, and incorporated into the air force's civilian charter fleet that shuttled workers between Nellis Air Force Base and the Tonopah Test Range during the F-117 Nighthawk development program. In 1996, the aircraft was scrapped for parts in a Memphis aircraft boneyard.

=== Effect on flight crew ===
The flight crew praised Mucklow for her actions. Mucklow continued to fly for the airline for several years. She lived privately and has only granted a few interviews since 2021. Captain William Scott, who rarely gave interviews, died in 2001. Rataczak died in 2025.

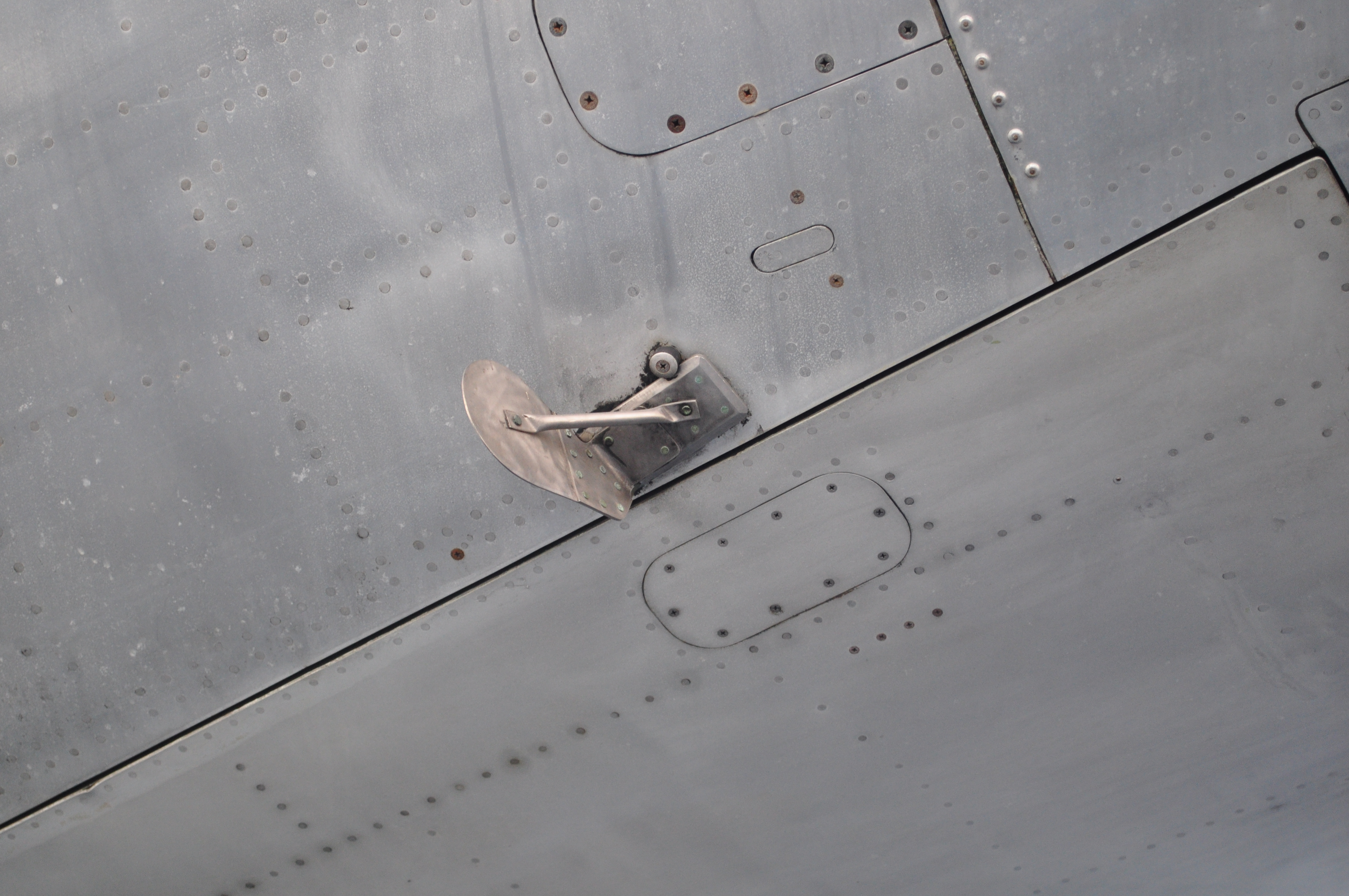
A Cooper vane in the unlocked position

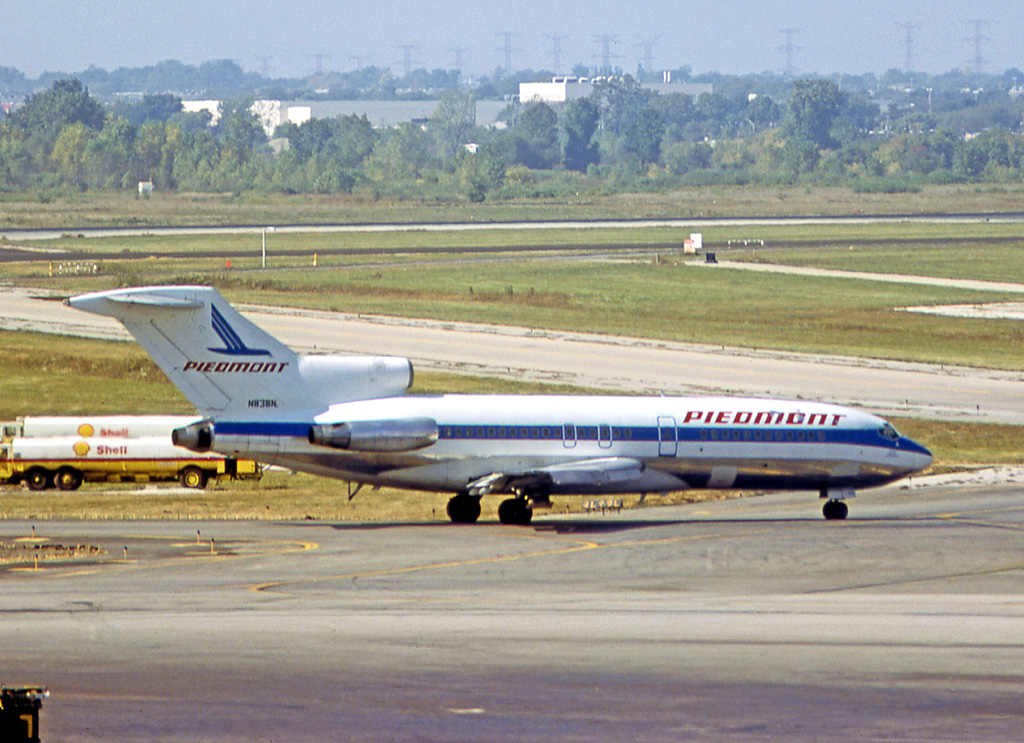
N467US, the 727 involved in the 1971 hijacking, in service with Piedmont Airlines as N838N in 1979

== In popular culture ==
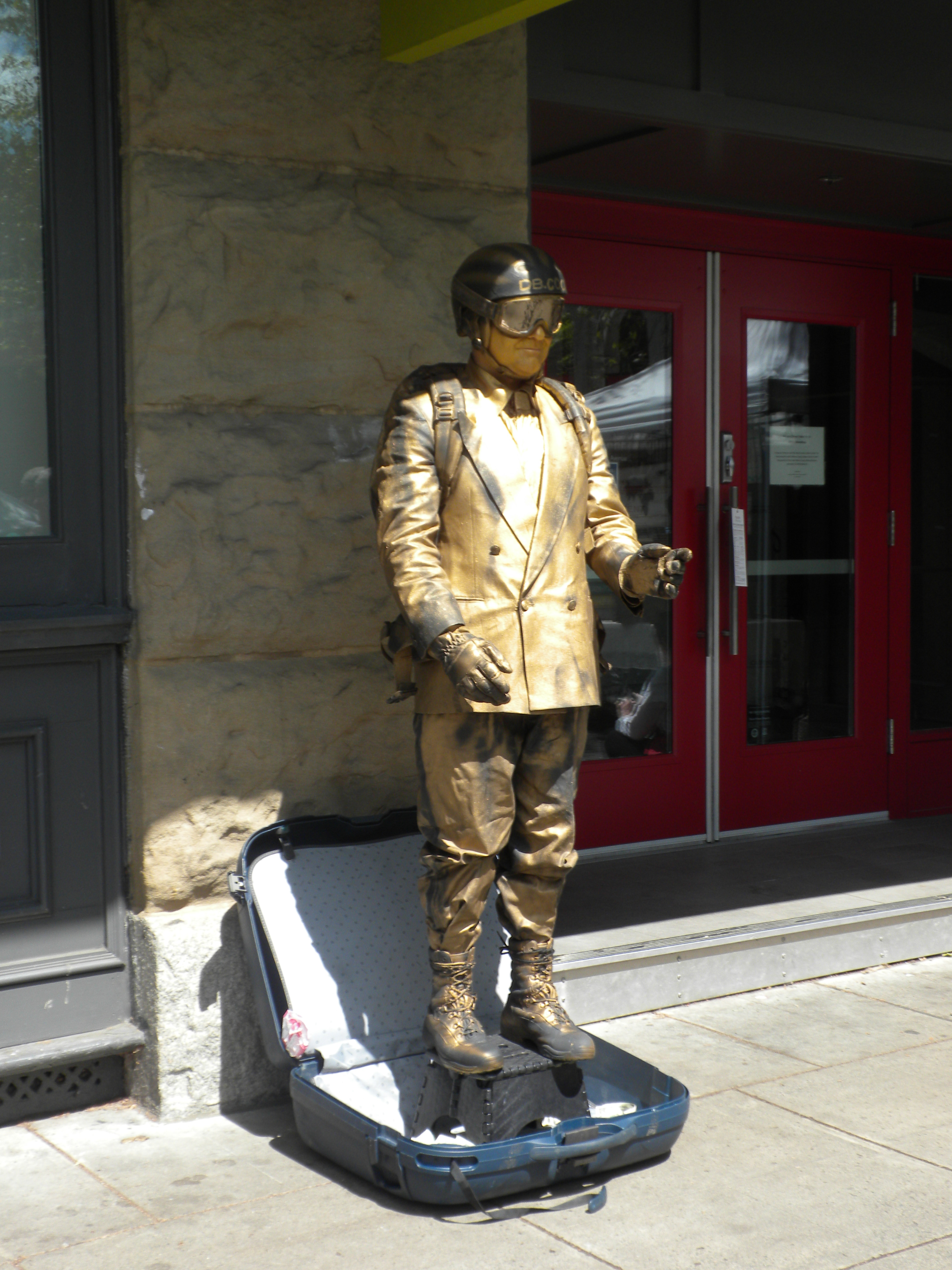
A street artist posing as a "living statue" of Cooper at the Portland Saturday Market in Portland, Oregon

Himmelsbach famously termed Cooper a "rotten sleazy crook", but his bold and unusual crime inspired a cult following that was expressed in song, movies, and literature. Novelty shops sold T-shirts emblazoned with "D. B. Cooper, Where Are You?" Restaurants and bowling alleys in the Pacific Northwest hold regular Cooper-themed promotions and sell tourist souvenirs. A "Cooper Day" celebration was held at the Ariel General Store and Tavern each November since 1974 until 2015, when the bar closed following the death of owner Dona Elliott.

An annual convention, known as CooperCon, is held every year in late November in Seattle, Washington. The event, founded by Cooper researcher Eric Ulis in 2018, is a multi-day gathering of Cooper researchers and enthusiasts. Originally held in Vancouver, Washington, it was relocated to Seattle beginning in 2023.

== See also ==
- Philippine Airlines Flight 812
- Vietnam Airlines Flight 850
- Cold case
- Gentleman thief
- List of fugitives from justice who disappeared

== Notes ==
- When Schaffner's description was relayed to the FBI command post in Portland, agents stated that dynamite sticks are typically brown or beige in color; the eight red cylinders were probably highway or railroad flares. But because they could not be certain, intervention could not be recommended.

== Bibliography ==
- Bragg, Lynn E. (2005). Myths and Mysteries of Washington. Guilford, Connecticut: Globe Pequot. ISBN 978-0762734276.
- Colbert, Thomas J.; Szollosi, Tom (2016). The Last Master Outlaw: How He Outfoxed the FBI Six Times – but Not a Cold Case Team (1st ed.). Jacaranda Roots Publishing. ISBN 978-0997740431.
- Edwards, Robert H. (2021). D. B. Cooper and Flight 305. Atglen, PA: Schiffer Publishing. ISBN 978-0-7643-6256-9.
- Gray, Geoffrey (2011b). Skyjack: The Hunt for D.B. Cooper. Crown. ISBN 978-0307451293.
- Gunther, Max (1985). D. B. Cooper: What Really Happened. Chicago: Contemporary Books. ISBN 978-0809251803. OCLC 12103370. Disclaimer — large amounts of Gunther's content based on alleged interviews with a woman known as "Clara", who claimed to have discovered an injured Cooper two days after the hijacking and lived with him until he died a decade later. This material is considered by the FBI and others as a hoax or fabrication, whether by Gunther or "Clara". For critical analysis, see Perry, Douglas (November 15, 2018). "New suspect in D.B. Cooper skyjacking case unearthed by Army data analyst; FBI stays mum". Oregon Live. Archived from the original on December 21, 2021. "Others called it straight-up fiction, and for good reason. A key subplot of the book – LeClair and Clara's meet-cute experience in a small, unnamed Northwest town the day after the skyjacking – is obviously untrue. ... Another interpretation: Gunther just made it all up."
- Hengi, B.I. (2000). Airlines Remembered. Midland. ISBN 978-1857800913.
- Himmelsbach, Ralph P.; Worcester, Thomas K. (1986). Norjak: The Investigation of D. B. Cooper. West Linn, Oregon: Norjak Project. ISBN 978-0961741501. Himmelsbach was the FBI's chief investigator on the case until his retirement in 1980; "Norjak" is FBI shorthand for the Cooper hijacking.
- Olson, Kay Melchisedech (2010). D.B. Cooper Hijacking: Vanishing Act. Compass Point Books. ISBN 978-0756543594. It is a straightforward accounting of official information and evidence.
