= History's Greatest Mysteries =

American documentary television series

- Genre: Documentary
- Narrated by: Laurence Fishburne
- Country of origin: United States
- Original language: English
- No. of seasons: 7
- No. of episodes: 100

Production
- Executive producers: Laurence Fishburne; Jason Blum; Helen Sugland; Scooter Yancey; Mary Donahue; Howard T. Owens; John Brimhall
- Running time: 60-90 minutes
- Production companies: History Channel; Blumhouse Television (season 1); eOne Television; The Content Group

Original release
- Network: History Channel
- Release: November 14, 2020 – present

History's Greatest Mysteries is an American documentary television series hosted and narrated by Laurence Fishburne. Each one-hour episode focuses on a person, place or topic in history surrounded by controversy and unanswered questions, and attempts to present and challenge what is known about them.

It premiered on November 14, 2020 on the History Channel.

== Episodes ==
=== Season 1 ===
No. overall	No. in season	Title	Original release date
1	1	"The Final Hunt for D.B. Cooper"	November 14, 2020
2	2	"Titanic's Lost Evidence"	November 21, 2020
3	3	"Endurance: The Hunt For Shackleton's Ice Ship"	November 28, 2020
4	4	"The Escape of John Wilkes Booth"	December 5, 2020
5	5	"Roswell: First Witness-- The Journal"	December 12, 2020
6	6	"Roswell: First Witness-- The Memo"	December 19, 2020
7	7	"Roswell: First Witness-- The Writer"	December 26, 2020

=== Season 2 ===
No. overall	No. in season	Title	Original release date
8	1	"Expedition Bermuda Triangle"	September 7, 2021
9	2	"Hunting Hitler's U-Boats"	September 14, 2021
10	3	"The Death of Bruce Lee"	September 21, 2021
11	4	"Houdini's Lost Diaries"	September 28, 2021

=== Season 3 ===
No. overall	No. in season	Title	Original release date
12	1	"The Amber Room"	February 22, 2022
13	2	"The Disappearance of Jimmy Hoffa"	February 28, 2022
14	3	"The Dyatlov Pass Incident"	March 7, 2022
15	4	"The Body on Somerton Beach"	March 14, 2022
16	5	"The Amityville Horror"	March 21, 2022
17	6	"The Holy Grail"	March 28, 2022
18	7	"Malaysia Flight 370"	April 11, 2022
19	8	"The Sodder Children Disappearance"	April 18, 2022
20	9	"The Voynich Manuscript"	April 25, 2022
21	10	"Jack the Ripper"	May 2, 2022
22	11	"The Lindbergh Baby Kidnapping"	May 9, 2022
23	12	"The Chicago Tylenol Murders"	May 16, 2022
24	13	"Shackleton's Endurance: The Lost Ice Ship Found"	March 22, 2022

=== Season 4 ===
No. overall	No. in season	Title	Original release date
25	1	"The Loch Ness Monster"	January 30, 2023
26	2	"Who Is the Zodiac Killer?"	February 6, 2023
27	3	"The Assassination of JFK"	February 12, 2023
28	4	"The Lost Colony of Roanoke"	February 20, 2023
29	5	"The Phoenix Lights Phenomenon"	February 27, 2023
30	6	"The Ark of the Covenant"	March 6, 2023
31	7	"The "Missingest" Man in America"	March 13, 2023
32	8	"Blackbeard's Lost Treasure"	March 20, 2023
33	9	"Decoding the Mysterious Antikythera Mechanism"	March 27, 2023
34	10	"The Puzzling Pyramids of Egypt"	April 17, 2023
35	11	"The Hunt for Stolen Nazi Treasure"	April 24, 2023
36	12	"The Deadly Bermuda Triangle"	May 1, 2023
37	13	"The Search for Noah's Ark"	May 8, 2023
38	14	"Who Is D.B. Cooper?"	May 15, 2023
39	15	"The Legend of Bigfoot"	May 22, 2023
40	16	"Unlocking the Secrets of Stonehenge"	May 29, 2023
41	17	"The Search for El Dorado"	June 5, 2023
42	18	"The Mysterious Havana Syndrome"	June 12, 2023
43	19	"Unlocking the Secrets of the Nazca Lines"	June 26, 2023
44	20	"The Hunt for Cleopatra's Missing Tomb"	July 10, 2023
45	21	"TWA Flight 800"	June 17, 2023
46	22	"The Hunt for Hitler"	July 24, 2023
47	23	"The Lost Gold of WWII"	July 31, 2023
48	24	"The Black Dahlia"	August 7, 2023
49	25	"Gardner Museum Robbery"	August 14, 2023

=== Season 5 ===
No. overall	No. in season	Title	Original release date
50	1	"Montezuma's Lost Treasure"	January 29, 2024
51	2	"The Garden of Eden"	February 5, 2024
52	3	"The Lost Fortune of the Knights Templar"	February 12, 2024
53	4	"The Shroud of Turin"	February 19, 2024
54	5	"Captain Kidd's Treasure"	March 4, 2024
55	6	"Escape from Alcatraz"	March 11, 2024
56	7	"The Battle of Los Angeles"	March 18, 2024
57	8	"The Mystery of Machu Picchu"	March 25, 2024
58	9	"Who Killed King Tut?"	June 3, 2024
59	10	"The Hindenburg Disaster"	June 10, 2024
60	11	"The Search for Alexander the Great"	June 17, 2024
61	12	"The Sinking of the Titanic"	June 24, 2024
62	13	"The Legend of the Lost Dutchman's Mine"	July 1, 2024
63	14	"The Assassination of RFK"	July 8, 2024
64	15	"The Salem Witch Trials"	July 15, 2024

=== Season 6 ===
No. overall	No. in season	Title	Original release date
65	1	"Roswell"	January 27, 2025
66	2	"The Franklin Expedition"	February 3, 2025
67	3	"The Valentine's Day Massacre"	February 10, 2025
68	4	"What Is the Yeti?"	February 24, 2025
69	5	"The Final Flight of Amelia Earhart"	March 3, 2025
70	6	"The Death and Fortune of Pablo Escobar"	March 10, 2025
71	7	"The Lost Loot of Jesse James"	March 17, 2025
72	8	"The Rendlesham Forest Incident"	March 24, 2025
73	9	"The Amazing Events of the Book of Exodus"	April 14, 2025
74	10	"The Search for Atlantis"	April 21, 2025
75	11	"The Death of Dillinger"	April 28, 2025
76	12	"The Missing Riches of Genghis Khan"	May 5, 2025
77	13	"The Missing Tesla Papers"	May 12, 2025
78	14	"Secrets of the Copper Scroll"	May 19, 2025
79	15	"The Killing of Bugsy Siegel"	July 14, 2025
80	16	"Percy Fawcett and the Lost City of Z"	July 21, 2025
81	17	"Secrets of the Sphinx"	July 28, 2025
82	18	"The Lost Pirate Treasure of Jean Lafitte"	August 4, 2025
83	19	"The Secrets of Easter Island"	August 11, 2025
84	20	"Lost Places of the Old Testament"	August 18, 2025

=== Season 7 ===
No. overall	No. in season	Title	Original release date
85	1	"Area 51"	January 26, 2026
86	2	"The Hunt for Adolf Eichmann: Case Closed"	February 2, 2026
87	3	"The Legend of the Werewolf"	February 9, 2026
88	4	"The Theft of the Mona Lisa: Case Closed"	February 23, 2026
89	5	"The Hunt for the Kraken"	March 2, 2026
90	6	"The Murder of Sam Giancana"	March 9, 2026
91	7	"The Unabomber: Case Closed"	March 16, 2026
92	8	"Who Is the Boston Strangler?"	March 23, 2026
93	9	"The Plot to Kill Lincoln"	April 6, 2026
94	10	"The Hunt for El Chapo: Case Closed"	April 13, 2026
95	11	"What Killed Bruce Lee?"	April 20, 2026
96	12	"The Hunt for Viking Treasure"	April 27, 2026
97	13	"The Lufthansa Heist"	May 4, 2026
98	14	"Foo Fighters: WWII Edition"	May 11, 2026
99	15	"The Search for Rommel's Gold"	May 18, 2026
100	16	"The Shot Heard Round the World"	October 8, 2026
