= Philippine Airlines Flight 812 =

2000 aircraft hijacking over the Philippines

Hijacking
- Date: May 25, 2000
- Summary: Aircraft hijacking
- Site: Over Antipolo, Rizal, Philippines

Aircraft
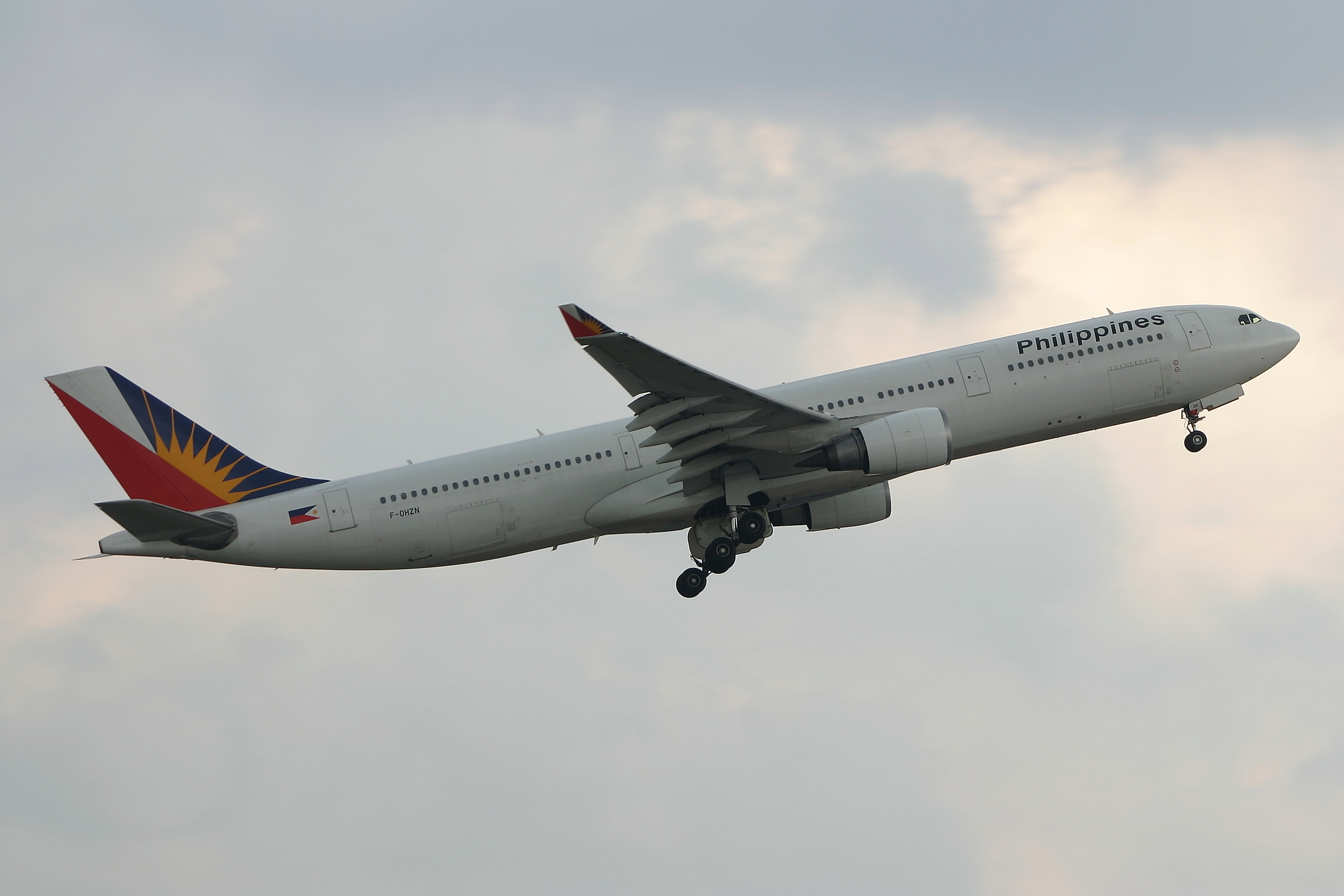
- F-OHZN, the aircraft involved in the hijacking, seen in 2005
- Aircraft type: Airbus A330-301
- Operator: Philippine Airlines
- Registration: F-OHZN
- Flight origin: Francisco Bangoy International Airport, Davao City
- Destination: Ninoy Aquino International Airport, Manila
- Occupants: 291 (including hijacker)
- Passengers: 278 (including hijacker)
- Crew: 13
- Fatalities: 1 (hijacker)
- Survivors: 290

Philippine Airlines Flight 812 was a scheduled domestic passenger flight from Francisco Bangoy International Airport in Davao City to Ninoy Aquino International Airport near Manila. On May 25, 2000, an Airbus A330 operating on the route was hijacked by a man later identified as Reginald Chua, shortly before the airplane was about to land. The flight carried 278 passengers and 13 crew members.

== Aircraft ==
The aircraft involved was a three-year old A330-300 that had been delivered to Philippine Airlines in August of 1997. It was operated by two General Electric CF6 engines. After the hijacking, the plane was returned to service wherein it was re-registered in June 2008 as RP-C3331. It was withdrawn from use in July 2014 and stored at Greenwood Leflore Airport, where it was eventually scrapped the next year.

== Hijacking ==
The hijacker, Reginald Chua, was armed with a gun and a hand grenade. He fired a gun into a bulkhead and demanded to be let into the cockpit. When access was refused, he then demanded the passengers place their valuables in a bag before he commanded the pilot to descend and depressurize the aircraft so that he could escape by a homemade parachute. Since it did not have a rip cord, one was made with a curtain sash on the aircraft. Before he was about to jump, he wasn't able to overcome the gust of wind from the plane's open rear door, and a flight attendant helped him jump out of the plane.

The hijacker was wearing a ski mask and swimming goggles when he jumped out of the plane together with the valuables he had stolen while the plane was flying at an altitude of 1,800 meters (5,900 ft) over Antipolo, Rizal. Officials initially identified him as "Augusto Lakandula", based on the name on his ticket. The pilot expressed skepticism that the hijacker would have survived the jump.

Three days after the hijacking, the hijacker was found dead, his body nearly buried in the mud, in the village of Llavac in Real, Quezon, about 70 kilometers (43 mi) southeast of Manila, near the border with Laguna. Police authorities stated that he died since he was unable to get his parachute to open. Through his driver's license, "Lakandula" was finally correctly identified as Reginald Chua, who reportedly lost his job as a security guard and suffered financial difficulties. Mental health was also a significant focus.

== In popular culture ==
The incident is referenced in the 2013 Filipino film Metro Manila. The film's protagonist Oscar Ramirez (Jake Macapagal) tells the story of Alfred Santos, a textile factory owner who lost his father to a gang hired by a rival factory. Having been forced to shut down his business due to continuous threats by his rival, Santos hijacked an airliner and ordered the passengers to surrender their money and valuables before jumping off the plane to his death.

A year later, Flight 812's hijacking would be the basis of the plot of the Shake Rattle and Roll XV segment "Flight 666".

== See also ==
- Northwest Orient Airlines Flight 305
- Vietnam Airlines Flight 850
