= Cooper vane =

Airplane stairs security device

Animation showing how a ventral airstair operates. The Cooper vane was makes this impossible in flight.

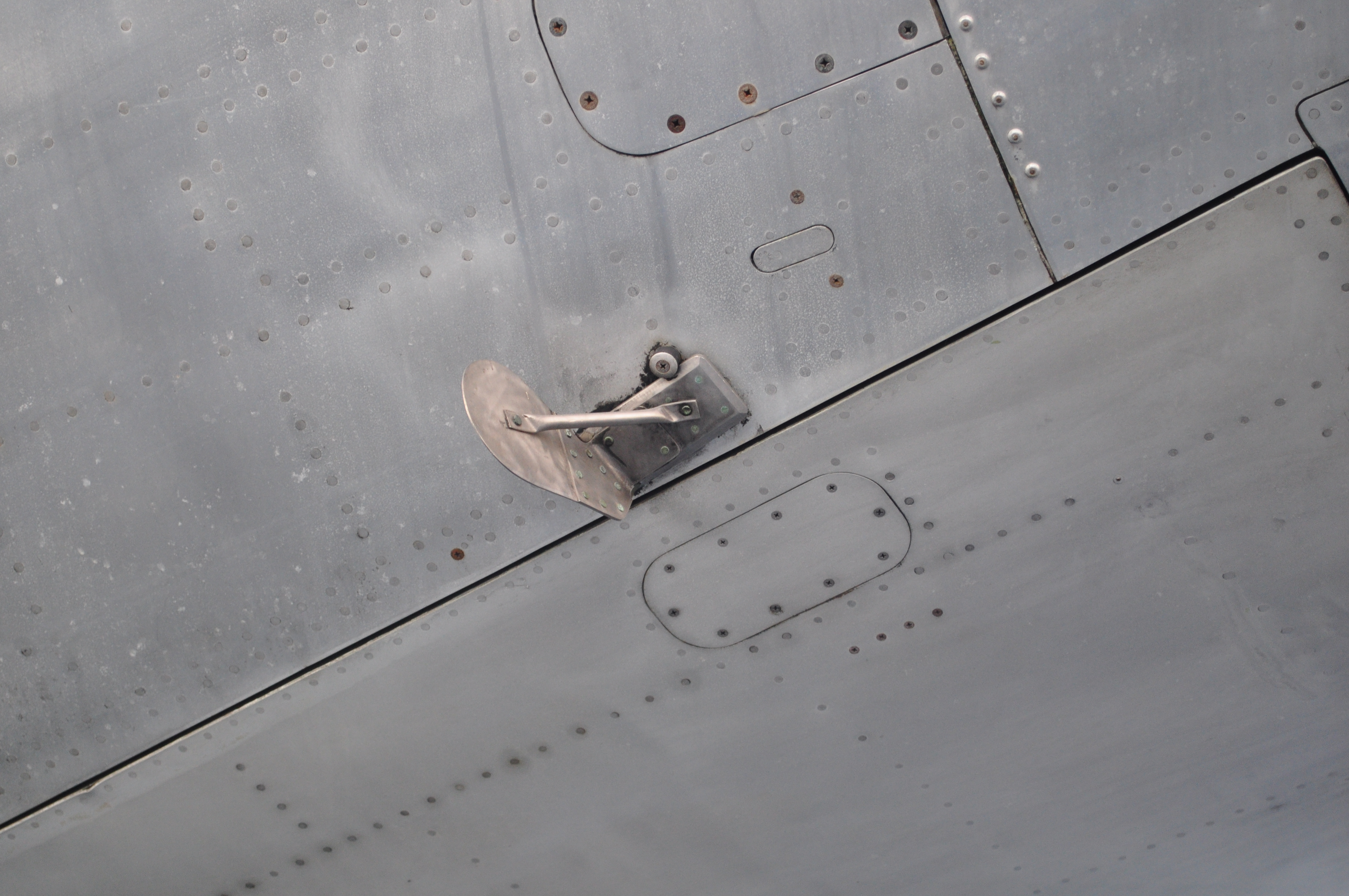
The Cooper vane in place on the aircraft. The front of the aircraft is to the bottom left; the vane rotates clockwise through 90 degrees to secure the ramp.

A Cooper vane, also sometimes called a Dan Cooper switch or D.B. Cooper device, is a mechanical aerodynamic wedge that prevents the ventral airstair of an aircraft from being lowered in flight.

== History ==
Following three hijackings in 1972, the US Federal Aviation Administration ordered that Boeing 727 aircraft be fitted with Cooper vanes. The device was named for an unidentified airplane hijacker dubbed D. B. Cooper, who used the rear airstair to exit a Boeing 727 in flight and make a parachute escape.

== Design ==
The Cooper vane is a simple device consisting of a spring-loaded paddle connected to a plate that prevents the ventral airstair of an aircraft from being lowered in flight. At rest, a spring keeps the paddle perpendicular to the fuselage and free of the stairway. Once in motion, the paddle acts like a weathervane and aligns parallel with the airflow, pivoting the plate beneath the stairway and preventing it from opening.

McDonnell Douglas DC-9 aircraft with ventral stairs were also equipped with Cooper vanes.
