= Max Gunther =

American journalist

- Born: 28 June 1927; England, United Kingdom
- Died: 28 June 1998 (aged 71)
- Education: Princeton University
- Military career
- Allegiance: United States
- Service years: 1950–1951

Max Gunther (June 28, 1927 – June 28, 1998) was an Anglo-American journalist and writer. He was the author of 26 books, including his investment best-seller, The Zurich Axioms.

Born in England, Gunther moved to the United States aged 11 after his father, Franz Heinrich (Frank Henry) became the manager of the New York branch of a leading Swiss bank, Schweizerischer Bankverein (Swiss Bank Corporation or SBC). In 1998, the bank was merged with Union Bank of Switzerland to form UBS, the second largest wealth management organisation in the world and the second largest bank in Europe. Gunther's book, The Zurich Axioms is largely based on his father's trading advice.

Gunther graduated from Princeton University in 1949 and served in the United States Army from 1950 to 1951.

He worked at Business Week magazine from 1951 to 1955 and during the following two years he was the contributing editor for Time Magazine. He also contributed to Playboy, True, Reader's Digest, TV Guide, McCall's, and Saturday Evening Post.

He lived most of his adult life in Ridgefield, Connecticut. He died on his birthday, at the age of 71.

== Selected bibliography ==
- The Weekenders (1964)
- The Split-Level Trap (1964)
- Wall Street and Witchcraft (1971)
- The Very, Very Rich and How They Got That Way (1973)
- Instant Millionaires: The Secrets of Overnight Success (1973)
- Writing and Selling a Nonfiction Book (1973)
- Virility 8: A Celebration of the American Male (1975)
- "The Luck Factor" Harriman House ISBN 9781906659950 (1977)
- The Zurich Axioms ISBN 9781906659943 (1985 1st print)
- How to Get Lucky: 13 Techniques for Discovering and Taking Advantage of Life's Good Breaks (1986)
- D.B. Cooper: What Really Happened McGraw-Hill ISBN 9780809248544 (1985 1st print)
- Doom Wind (1987)
- Confessions of a P.R. Man (1989)
