= Geoffrey Gray =

American journalist

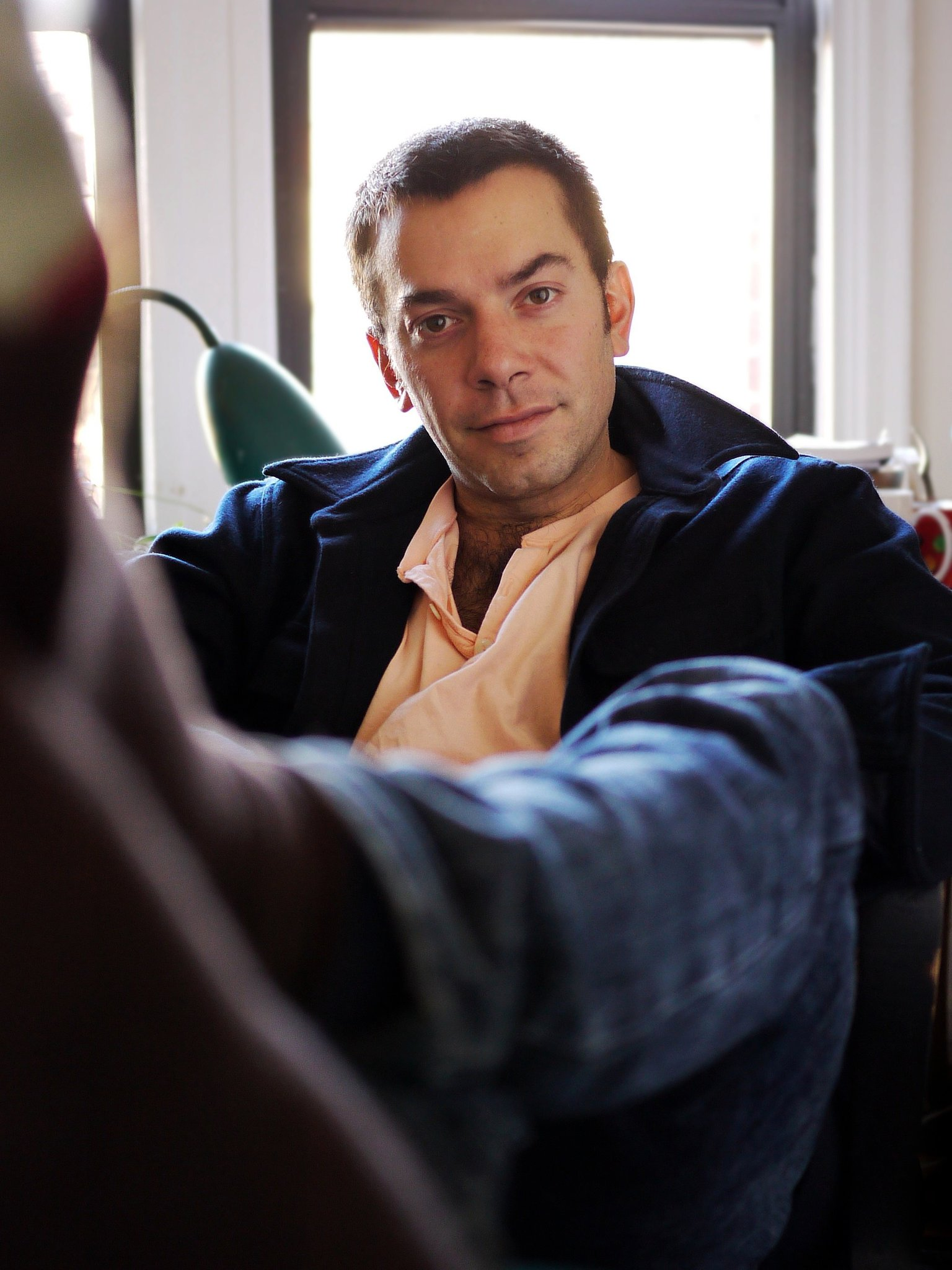
- Gray in 2015
- Born: February 19, 1979 (age 47); Binghamton, New York, U.S.
- Occupations: Author, producer, journalist
- Employer: New York magazine

Geoffrey Gray (born February 19, 1979) is an American author, documentary producer, and journalist. He is a contributing editor at New York magazine.

== Biography and education ==
Gray was born in Binghamton, New York. He attended Northfield Mount Hermon School, and also studied in Alexandria, Egypt. In 1997, he enrolled at the University of Rochester and later dropped out to move to New York City and pursue a career in journalism.

== Work ==
He published his first essay for The New York Times. He worked there until moving to the Village Voice, where he investigated poverty pimps, and cases against the wrongfully accused. In 2003, Gray began covering boxing for the New York Times, writing about underdogs in their industries, laborers and legends like Mike Tyson. . Two years later, Gray started work at the New York City Police Department headquarters, covering the crime beat for the New York Sun. In 2006, he became a staff writer and later contributing editor at New York magazine.

Gray is known for his eccentric choice of subjects, profiling a tour bus driver that also served as a Nigerian king, the world's most daring fragrance expert, and the world's most gored matador. Gray's interest in underdogs is a common theme in his works. In 2008, he produced and narrated a segment of the Showtime series This American Life, which featured a pair of troubled boxers in Tennessee.

His work has appeared in the New York Times Magazine, Sports Illustrated, ESPN: The Magazine, and Departures. He has also been featured as an expert on Good Morning America, NBC Today and CNN. Gray lives in New York City. Gray is also the founder of True.Ink, an interactive magazine devoted to expertise and adventure.

== Publications ==
In 2011, Gray published his first book, Skyjack: The Hunt for D.B Cooper, based on the infamous D. B. Cooper case and on thousands of confidential case files. The book made The New York Times Best Seller list after the first week of publication. Gay Talese called the book "a delectable adventure from a talented new author."

In 2013, Gray produced a feature film, Patrolman P, a documentary about a legendary and corrupt police detective in the 1970s. It premiered in New York City.
