= Reona Ito =

- 伊藤 玲阿奈
- Born: 1979 (age 46–47); Fukuoka, Japan
- Education: George Washington University
- Musical career
- Genre: Classical
- Occupation: Conductor
- Member of: Reona Ito Chamber Orchestra

Reona Ito (伊藤 玲阿奈, Itō Reona; born 1979) is a Japanese orchestral and choral conductor and author based in New York City.

Ito is the third generation to be born into a musical family of conductors in Fukuoka, Japan. He moved to the US in 1997 in order to study international affairs at the Elliott School of International Affairs of the George Washington University. After graduating, however, he decided to become a professional musician and moved to New York City to study intensively.

Ito started his professional career as a conductor in March 2008 with Mozart's opera The Marriage of Figaro at the Goldstein Theatre in Queens, New York. Soon after the debut he became music director of the Reona Ito Chamber Orchestra, a professional orchestra newly established by himself and the Japanese immigrant community in the New York metropolitan area. Ito's inaugural performance with the ensemble was at Carnegie Hall in June of the same year.

From 2011 to 2013, Ito was music director of Zagreb Sinfonietta in Croatia. In August 2012 he and the orchestra were invited by the Poreč Music Festival to perform at the Euphrasian Basilica, one of the UNESCO World Heritage Sites. On 5 March 2013 he conducted a special concert celebrating the 20th-Year Anniversary of the Japan-Croatia Diplomatic Establishment, which was supported by the Office of the President of the Republic of Croatia and the Embassy of Japan. Ito was also invited for an official meeting with the then president Ivo Josipović at the Office.

In October 2014, Ito placed as third runner up of the American Prize in Orchestral Conducting (Professional Orchestra Division), one of the most prestigious national prizes for classical musicians in the US.

== Writings ==
- Ito, Reona. 2020. "Hearing the Music of the Spheres (宇宙の音楽を聴く, Uchū no Ongaku o Kiku)". Kobunsha. ISBN 978-4334045067.
- Ito, Reona. 2016. "On the Case of ‘Japan’s Beethoven’ Mamoru Samuragochi: ‘Real’ Beethoven and General Awareness on Rights & Duties in Western Music History". The Bulletin of Musashino Gakuin University Japan Research Institute, Vol. 13: 151–159. ISSN 1349-8215.
- Ito, Reona. 2009. “A Conductor and His Orchestra: A Bridge between Cultures”. The Consulate General of Japan in New York “Japan Info”, Vol. 27.
