= The Washington Quarterly =

US journal

- Cover of Volume 40, Issue 1.
- Editor: Alexander T. J. Lennon
- Categories: International affairs
- Frequency: Quarterly
- Publisher: Taylor & Francis
- First issue: 1978
- Country: United States
- Website: twq.elliott.gwu.edu
- ISSN: 0163-660X (print); 1530-9177 (web)
- OCLC: 4413219

The Washington Quarterly (abbreviated as TWQ) is a magazine of international affairs covering topics and issues concerning global security, diplomatic relations, and policy implications. Founded by the Center for Strategic and International Studies, TWQ is published by the George Washington University's Elliott School of International Affairs, in Washington, DC.

== History ==
The Washington Quarterly was founded in 1978 at the Center for Strategic and International Studies, one of the top think tanks in the United States. TWQ's original publisher was MIT Press.

In 2014, TWQ came under the patronage of the George Washington University, via the Elliott School of International Affairs. In 2008, TWQ's publishing agreement with MIT Press had ended and it began to be published by Taylor & Francis.
