= Inside the Ivory Tower =

Ranking of university international relations programs

- Categories: Higher education
- Frequency: Varies
- Publisher: Foreign Policy; College of William & Mary
- First issue: 2005; 21 years ago
- Country: United States
- Language: English
- Website: 2024 rankings

Inside the Ivory Tower is a ranking of the world's best university programs in international relations. The ranking is published by the Foreign Policy magazine in collaboration with the Teaching, Research, and International Policy (TRIP) Project at the College of William & Mary. The survey is based on input from "all international relations scholars employed at a college or university who have an affiliation with a political science department or school of public policy and who teach or conduct research on issues that cross international borders."

The first TRIP Faculty Survey was conducted in 2004. One of the questions asked respondents to rank International Relations graduate schools in the U.S. The survey has since expanded to include undergraduate programs. The survey began including universities outside of the U.S. in 2009. The survey was last conducted in 2024, and asks the respondents to rank the top five international relations programs by degree level. The rankings are determined by the percentage of respondents who list a particular school.

== 2024 Rankings ==
The 2024 rankings were split out by degree level and specialty, with separate surveys conducted with international relations faculty, policymakers, and think tank staffers as respondents. For the first time, respondents were asked to differentiate between PhD programs for academics and policymakers in their responses.

=== Undergraduate Programs ===
International Relations Faculty
| Rank | Country | School | Percent |
|---|---|---|---|
| 1 | USA | Princeton University | 48.37 |
| 2 | USA | Harvard University | 46.65 |
| 3 | USA | Georgetown University | 43.59 |
| 4 | USA | Stanford University | 42.83 |
| 5 | USA | Columbia University | 29.83 |
| 6 | USA | University of Chicago | 23.33 |
| 7 | USA | Yale University | 17.4 |
| 8 | USA | American University | 15.49 |
| 9 | USA | George Washington University | 14.91 |
| 10 | USA | Dartmouth College | 14.72 |
| 11 | USA | University of California, San Diego | 11.85 |
| 12 | USA | University of California, Berkeley | 10.52 |
| 13 | USA | University of Michigan | 10.33 |
| 14 | USA | Johns Hopkins University | 10.13 |
| 14 | USA | Tufts University | 10.13 |
| 16 | USA | William & Mary College | 9.56 |
| 17 | USA | Massachusetts Institute of Technology | 8.22 |
| 18 | USA | University of Pennsylvania | 5.93 |
| 19 | USA | Brown University | 5.35 |
| 20 | USA | Swarthmore College | 4.02 |
| 20 | USA | University of Denver | 4.02 |
| 22 | USA | Ohio State University | 3.82 |
| 22 | USA | University of California, Los Angeles | 3.82 |
| 24 | USA | Cornell University | 3.63 |
| 25 | USA | University of Virginia | 3.44 |

Policymakers
| Rank | Country | School | Percent |
|---|---|---|---|
| 1 | USA | Georgetown University | 70.39 |
| 2 | USA | Harvard University | 61.18 |
| 3 | USA | Princeton University | 42.11 |
| 4 | USA | Stanford University | 38.82 |
| 5 | USA | Johns Hopkins University | 30.92 |
| 6 | USA | Yale University | 28.95 |
| 7 | USA | Tufts University | 27.63 |
| 8 | USA | George Washington University | 25 |
| 9 | USA | Columbia University | 22.37 |
| 10 | USA | American University | 11.18 |
| 10 | USA | University of Chicago | 11.18 |
| 12 | USA | University of California, Berkeley | 8.55 |
| 13 | USA | University of Virginia | 6.58 |
| 14 | USA | William & Mary College | 4.61 |
| 15 | USA | University of Michigan | 3.95 |
| 15 | USA | University of Texas at Austin | 3.95 |
| 17 | USA | Massachusetts Institute of Technology | 3.29 |
| 18 | USA | Brown University | 2.63 |
| 18 | USA | New York University | 2.63 |
| 18 | USA | University of Pennsylvania | 2.63 |
| 18 | USA | Williams College | 2.63 |
| 22 | USA | Cornell University | 1.97 |
| 22 | USA | Dartmouth College | 1.97 |
| 22 | USA | Duke University | 1.97 |
| 22 | USA | Middlebury College | 1.97 |
| 22 | USA | Syracuse University | 1.97 |
| 22 | USA | Texas A&M University | 1.97 |
| 22 | USA | United States Military Academy | 1.97 |
| 22 | USA | University of California, Los Angeles | 1.97 |

Think Tank Staffers
| Rank | Country | School | Percent |
|---|---|---|---|
| 1 | USA | Georgetown University | 65.12 |
| 2 | USA | Harvard University | 64.34 |
| 3 | USA | Princeton University | 47.29 |
| 4 | USA | Stanford University | 44.19 |
| 5 | USA | Columbia University | 40.31 |
| 6 | USA | Yale University | 29.46 |
| 7 | USA | Johns Hopkins University | 27.13 |
| 8 | USA | George Washington University | 21.71 |
| 9 | USA | Tufts University | 16.28 |
| 10 | USA | University of Chicago | 14.73 |
| 11 | USA | American University | 6.98 |
| 11 | USA | University of California, Berkeley | 6.98 |
| 13 | USA | University of California, San Diego | 6.2 |
| 14 | USA | Massachusetts Institute of Technology | 5.43 |
| 15 | USA | Cornell University | 3.88 |
| 15 | USA | University of Pennsylvania | 3.88 |
| 15 | USA | William & Mary College | 3.88 |
| 15 | USA | Williams College | 3.88 |
| 19 | USA | Dartmouth College | 3.1 |
| 20 | USA | Brown University | 2.33 |
| 20 | USA | New York University | 2.33 |
| 20 | USA | University of Michigan | 2.33 |
| 20 | USA | University of Virginia | 2.33 |
| 24 | USA | Duke University | 1.55 |
| 24 | USA | Northwestern University | 1.55 |
| 24 | USA | Swarthmore College | 1.55 |
| 24 | USA | Texas A&M University | 1.55 |
| 24 | USA | University of California, Davis | 1.55 |
| 24 | USA | University of California, Los Angeles | 1.55 |
| 24 | USA | University of Denver | 1.55 |
| 24 | USA | University of Southern California | 1.55 |
| 24 | USA | University of Washington | 1.55 |

=== Master's Programs ===
International Relations Faculty
| Rank | Country | School | Percent |
|---|---|---|---|
| 1 | USA | Georgetown University (Walsh) | 75.34 |
| 2 | USA | Johns Hopkins University (SAIS) | 59.03 |
| 3 | USA | Harvard University (Kennedy) | 52.23 |
| 4 | USA | Columbia University (SIPA) | 39.61 |
| 5 | USA | Princeton University (SPIA) | 34.37 |
| 6 | USA | George Washington University (Elliott) | 33.2 |
| 7 | USA | Tufts University | 32.04 |
| 8 | USA | American University | 22.52 |
| 9 | UK | London School of Economics | 13.59 |
| 10 | USA | University of Chicago | 12.04 |
| 11 | USA | Stanford University | 8.16 |
| 12 | USA | University of Denver | 7.77 |
| 13 | USA | Yale University | 6.41 |
| 14 | USA | University of California, San Diego | 4.66 |
| 15 | France | Sciences Po-Paris | 4.27 |
| 16 | USA | Syracuse University (Maxwell) | 4.08 |
| 17 | UK | University of Oxford | 3.69 |
| 18 | USA | Texas A&M University (Bush) | 3.11 |
| 19 | USA | University of Texas at Austin (LBJ) | 2.72 |
| 20 | Switzerland | Geneva Graduate Institute | 2.33 |
| 21 | UK | King's College London | 2.14 |
| 21 | UK | University of Cambridge | 2.14 |
| 21 | USA | University of Michigan (Ford) | 2.14 |
| 24 | USA | New York University | 1.75 |
| 25 | USA | Massachusetts Institute of Technology | 1.55 |

Policymakers
| Rank | Country | School | Percent |
|---|---|---|---|
| 1 | USA | Georgetown University (Walsh) | 67.39 |
| 2 | USA | Johns Hopkins University (SAIS) | 61.59 |
| 3 | USA | Harvard University (Kennedy) | 58.7 |
| 4 | USA | Tufts University | 39.13 |
| 5 | USA | Princeton University (SPIA) | 34.78 |
| 6 | USA | Columbia University (SIPA) | 26.81 |
| 7 | UK | London School of Economics | 20.29 |
| 8 | USA | George Washington University (Elliott) | 17.39 |
| 9 | USA | Stanford University | 14.49 |
| 10 | USA | American University | 12.32 |
| 10 | USA | Yale University | 12.32 |
| 12 | UK | University of Oxford | 11.59 |
| 13 | USA | University of Chicago | 5.8 |
| 14 | France | Sciences Po-Paris | 4.35 |
| 15 | UK | King's College London | 3.62 |
| 16 | USA | National War College | 2.9 |
| 16 | USA | University of California, Berkeley | 2.9 |
| 18 | USA | National Defense University | 2.17 |
| 18 | UK | University of Cambridge | 2.17 |
| 18 | USA | University of Denver | 2.17 |
| 18 | USA | University of Pennsylvania | 2.17 |
| 18 | USA | University of Texas at Austin (LBJ) | 2.17 |
| 18 | USA | University of Virginia (Batten) | 2.17 |
| 24 | USA | Duke University (Sanford) | 1.45 |
| 24 | USA | George Mason University | 1.45 |
| 24 | USA | Liberty University | 1.45 |
| 24 | USA | Naval Postgraduate School | 1.45 |
| 24 | China | Schwarzman College at Tsinghua University | 1.45 |
| 24 | USA | University of Michigan (Ford) | 1.45 |
| 24 | USA | University of Pittsburgh (GSPIA) | 1.45 |
| 24 | USA | College of William & Mary | 1.45 |

Think Tank Staffers
| Rank | Country | School | Percent |
|---|---|---|---|
| 1 | USA | Georgetown University (Walsh) | 73.17 |
| 2 | USA | Johns Hopkins University (SAIS) | 65.85 |
| 3 | USA | Harvard University (Kennedy) | 52.03 |
| 4 | USA | Columbia University (SIPA) | 42.28 |
| 5 | USA | Tufts University | 39.84 |
| 6 | USA | Princeton University (SPIA) | 38.21 |
| 7 | USA | George Washington University (Elliott) | 21.14 |
| 8 | UK | London School of Economics | 17.07 |
| 9 | UK | University of Oxford | 16.26 |
| 10 | USA | Stanford University | 13.01 |
| 11 | USA | Yale University | 8.94 |
| 12 | USA | American University | 8.13 |
| 13 | USA | University of California, San Diego | 6.5 |
| 13 | France | Sciences Po-Paris | 6.5 |
| 15 | USA | University of Chicago | 5.69 |
| 16 | UK | King's College London | 3.25 |
| 16 | USA | New York University | 3.25 |
| 16 | USA | University of California, Berkeley | 3.25 |
| 19 | UK | University of Cambridge | 2.44 |
| 20 | Switzerland | Geneva Graduate Institute | 1.63 |
| 20 | USA | Massachusetts Institute of Technology | 1.63 |
| 20 | Singapore | National University of Singapore | 1.63 |
| 20 | USA | Texas A&M University (Bush) | 1.63 |
| 20 | UK | University of London | 1.63 |
| 20 | USA | University of Michigan (Ford) | 1.63 |
| 20 | USA | University of Texas at Austin (LBJ) | 1.63 |
| 20 | USA | University of Virginia (Batten) | 1.63 |

=== PhD Programs - Academic ===
International Relations Faculty
| Rank | Country | School | Percent |
|---|---|---|---|
| 1 | USA | Harvard University | 64.65 |
| 2 | USA | Princeton University | 60.3 |
| 3 | USA | Stanford University | 59.36 |
| 4 | USA | Columbia University | 38 |
| 5 | USA | University of Chicago | 27.6 |
| 6 | USA | Yale University | 27.03 |
| 7 | USA | Massachusetts Institute of Technology | 20.04 |
| 7 | USA | University of California, San Diego | 20.04 |
| 9 | USA | University of Michigan | 17.58 |
| 10 | USA | University of California, Berkeley | 17.01 |
| 11 | UK | University of Oxford | 12.85 |
| 12 | USA | Georgetown University | 11.53 |
| 13 | UK | London School of Economics | 7.94 |
| 14 | USA | Cornell University | 6.24 |
| 15 | USA | Johns Hopkins University | 6.05 |
| 16 | UK | University of Cambridge | 5.86 |
| 17 | USA | Ohio State University | 5.48 |
| 18 | USA | University of Pennsylvania | 5.29 |
| 19 | USA | George Washington University | 4.91 |
| 19 | USA | New York University | 4.91 |
| 21 | USA | American University | 4.16 |
| 22 | USA | University of California, Los Angeles | 3.78 |
| 23 | USA | Duke University | 2.65 |
| 24 | USA | Tufts University | 1.89 |
| 24 | USA | University of Minnesota, Twin Cities | 1.89 |

Policymakers
| Rank | Country | School | Percent |
|---|---|---|---|
| 1 | USA | Harvard University | 85.53 |
| 2 | USA | Stanford University | 56.58 |
| 3 | USA | Princeton University | 51.32 |
| 4 | USA | Yale University | 42.11 |
| 5 | UK | University of Oxford | 34.21 |
| 6 | USA | Georgetown University | 31.58 |
| 7 | USA | Columbia University | 27.63 |
| 8 | USA | Johns Hopkins University | 25 |
| 9 | USA | University of Chicago | 19.74 |
| 10 | UK | London School of Economics | 17.11 |
| 11 | USA | University of California, Berkeley | 13.16 |
| 12 | USA | Massachusetts Institute of Technology | 11.84 |
| 12 | UK | University of Cambridge | 11.84 |
| 14 | USA | Tufts University | 7.89 |
| 15 | USA | George Washington University | 5.26 |
| 16 | USA | American University | 3.95 |
| 16 | USA | Duke University | 3.95 |
| 16 | USA | University of Michigan | 3.95 |
| 19 | UK | King's College London | 2.63 |
| 19 | USA | New York University | 2.63 |
| 19 | France | Paris 1 Panthéon-Sorbonne University | 2.63 |
| 22 | USA | Dartmouth College | 1.32 |
| 22 | France | Sciences Po | 1.32 |
| 22 | USA | University of California, Los Angeles | 1.32 |
| 22 | USA | University of Denver | 1.32 |
| 22 | USA | University of Notre Dame | 1.32 |
| 22 | USA | University of Pennsylvania | 1.32 |
| 22 | USA | University of Texas at Austin | 1.32 |

Think Tank Staffers
| Rank | Country | School | Percent |
|---|---|---|---|
| 1 | USA | Harvard University | 77.08 |
| 2 | USA | Princeton University | 55.21 |
| 2 | USA | Stanford University | 55.21 |
| 4 | USA | Columbia University | 46.88 |
| 5 | USA | Yale University | 33.33 |
| 6 | UK | University of Oxford | 25 |
| 7 | USA | Massachusetts Institute of Technology | 23.96 |
| 8 | USA | Georgetown University | 22.92 |
| 9 | USA | University of Chicago | 19.79 |
| 10 | USA | Johns Hopkins University | 16.67 |
| 11 | USA | University of California, Berkeley | 13.54 |
| 12 | USA | Tufts University | 11.46 |
| 13 | UK | University of Cambridge | 8.33 |
| 14 | USA | University of California, San Diego | 7.29 |
| 14 | USA | University of Michigan | 7.29 |
| 16 | UK | London School of Economics | 6.25 |
| 17 | France | Sciences Po | 5.21 |
| 18 | USA | George Washington University | 4.17 |
| 19 | USA | Cornell University | 3.12 |
| 20 | USA | American University | 2.08 |
| 20 | USA | Duke University | 2.08 |
| 20 | USA | Ohio State University | 2.08 |
| 20 | USA | University of California, Los Angeles | 2.08 |
| 24 | Australia | Australian National University | 1.04 |
| 24 | UK | King's College London | 1.04 |
| 24 | Singapore | National University of Singapore | 1.04 |
| 24 | USA | New York University | 1.04 |
| 24 | USA | Northwestern University | 1.04 |
| 24 | USA | Pennsylvania State University | 1.04 |
| 24 | USA | University of Illinois, Urbana-Champaign | 1.04 |
| 24 | UK | University of London | 1.04 |
| 24 | USA | University of Pennsylvania | 1.04 |
| 24 | UK | University of St. Andrews | 1.04 |
| 24 | USA | University of Virginia | 1.04 |
| 24 | USA | University of Wisconsin, Milwaukee | 1.04 |

=== PhD Programs - Policymakers ===
International Relations Faculty
| Rank | Country | School | Percent |
|---|---|---|---|
| 1 | USA | Harvard University | 64.27 |
| 2 | USA | Georgetown University | 58.24 |
| 3 | USA | Princeton University | 38.75 |
| 4 | USA | Johns Hopkins University | 36.43 |
| 5 | USA | Columbia University | 35.03 |
| 6 | USA | Stanford University | 23.9 |
| 7 | USA | George Washington University | 23.67 |
| 8 | USA | Tufts University | 20.65 |
| 9 | USA | Massachusetts Institute of Technology | 19.26 |
| 10 | UK | London School of Economics | 18.1 |
| 11 | USA | American University | 17.4 |
| 12 | UK | University of Oxford | 15.55 |
| 13 | USA | University of Chicago | 12.3 |
| 14 | USA | Yale University | 11.37 |
| 15 | UK | University of Cambridge | 7.42 |
| 16 | USA | University of California, San Diego | 4.41 |
| 17 | USA | University of California, Berkeley | 4.18 |
| 17 | USA | University of Michigan | 4.18 |
| 19 | France | Sciences Po | 3.94 |
| 20 | Switzerland | Geneva Graduate Institute | 3.25 |
| 21 | UK | King's College London | 2.55 |
| 21 | USA | University of Denver | 2.55 |
| 23 | USA | New York University | 2.09 |
| 24 | USA | Duke University | 1.86 |
| 25 | USA | University of Maryland, College Park | 1.62 |

Policymakers
| Rank | Country | School | Percent |
|---|---|---|---|
| 1 | USA | Harvard University | 72.92 |
| 2 | USA | Georgetown University | 44.79 |
| 2 | USA | Princeton University | 44.79 |
| 4 | USA | Stanford University | 43.75 |
| 5 | USA | Johns Hopkins University | 33.33 |
| 6 | USA | Columbia University | 26.04 |
| 7 | USA | Yale University | 25 |
| 8 | UK | University of Oxford | 21.88 |
| 9 | USA | Tufts University | 19.79 |
| 10 | UK | London School of Economics | 17.71 |
| 11 | USA | University of Chicago | 14.58 |
| 12 | USA | American University | 13.54 |
| 13 | USA | University of California, Berkeley | 9.38 |
| 14 | USA | Massachusetts Institute of Technology | 8.33 |
| 15 | USA | George Washington University | 7.29 |
| 16 | UK | King's College London | 6.25 |
| 16 | UK | University of Cambridge | 6.25 |
| 18 | USA | University of Michigan | 5.21 |
| 19 | France | Sciences Po | 4.17 |
| 20 | USA | Duke University | 3.12 |
| 20 | USA | University of Pennsylvania | 3.12 |
| 22 | USA | Northwestern University | 2.08 |
| 23 | USA | Boston University | 1.04 |
| 23 | USA | Florida International University | 1.04 |
| 23 | USA | Frederick S. Pardee RAND Graduate School | 1.04 |
| 23 | Switzerland | Geneva Graduate Institute | 1.04 |
| 23 | USA | George Mason University | 1.04 |
| 23 | UK | Imperial College London | 1.04 |
| 23 | USA | Liberty University | 1.04 |
| 23 | USA | Missouri State University | 1.04 |
| 23 | USA | New York University | 1.04 |
| 23 | USA | Syracuse University | 1.04 |
| 23 | USA | Texas A&M University | 1.04 |
| 23 | USA | Ohio State University | 1.04 |
| 23 | China | Schwarzman College at Tsinghua University | 1.04 |
| 23 | USA | University of California, San Diego | 1.04 |
| 23 | USA | University of Denver | 1.04 |
| 23 | USA | University of Miami | 1.04 |
| 23 | France | Paris 1 Panthéon-Sorbonne University | 1.04 |
| 23 | UK | University of Sussex | 1.04 |
| 23 | USA | University of Virginia | 1.04 |
| 23 | USA | University of Washington | 1.04 |
| 23 | USA | Wake Forest University | 1.04 |

Think Tank Staffers
| Rank | Country | School | Percent |
|---|---|---|---|
| 1 | USA | Harvard University | 66.67 |
| 2 | USA | Georgetown University | 49.43 |
| 3 | USA | Johns Hopkins University | 44.83 |
| 4 | USA | Columbia University | 41.38 |
| 5 | USA | Princeton University | 33.33 |
| 6 | USA | Stanford University | 31.03 |
| 7 | UK | University of Oxford | 27.59 |
| 8 | USA | Tufts University | 24.14 |
| 9 | USA | George Washington University | 19.54 |
| 10 | UK | London School of Economics | 17.24 |
| 11 | USA | Massachusetts Institute of Technology | 16.09 |
| 12 | USA | Yale University | 13.79 |
| 13 | USA | American University | 9.2 |
| 13 | USA | University of Chicago | 9.2 |
| 15 | UK | University of Cambridge | 8.05 |
| 16 | UK | King's College London | 5.75 |
| 17 | France | Sciences Po | 4.6 |
| 18 | USA | University of California, Berkeley | 3.45 |
| 18 | USA | University of California, San Diego | 3.45 |
| 18 | UK | University of London | 3.45 |
| 21 | USA | George Mason University | 2.3 |
| 21 | UK | University College London | 2.3 |
| 21 | USA | University of Notre Dame | 2.3 |
| 21 | USA | University of Texas at Austin | 2.3 |
| 21 | USA | University of Virginia | 2.3 |

== 2018 Rankings ==
Undergraduate programs
| Rank | Country | School | Percent |
|---|---|---|---|
| 1 | USA | Harvard University | 51.10 |
| 2 | USA | Princeton University | 49.14 |
| 3 | USA | Stanford University | 41.67 |
| 4 | USA | Georgetown University (Walsh) | 39.46 |
| 5 | USA | Columbia University | 32.97 |
| 6 | USA | Yale University | 21.08 |
| 7 | USA | University of Chicago | 20.96 |
| 8 | USA | George Washington University (Elliott) | 17.40 |
| 9 | USA | American University | 15.20 |
| 10 | USA | University of California, Berkeley | 11.64 |
| 11 | USA | University of California, San Diego | 9.68 |
| 12 | USA | Dartmouth College | 9.56 |
| 13 | USA | Tufts University | 9.07 |
| 14 | USA | University of Michigan | 8.58 |
| 15 | USA | Johns Hopkins University | 7.23 |
| 16 | USA | College of William & Mar | 6.86 |
| 17 | USA | Massachusetts Institute of Technology | 6.37 |
| 18 | USA | Cornell University | 5.76 |
| 19 | USA | University of Pennsylvania | 4.53 |
| 19 | USA | Ohio State University | 4.53 |
| 21 | USA | Williams College | 3.68 |
| 22 | USA | Brown University (Watson) | 3.31 |
| 23 | USA | University of Virginia | 3.19 |
| 24 | USA | Swarthmore College | 3.06 |
| 24 | USA | University of California, Los Angeles | 3.06 |

Master's programs
| Rank | Country | School | Percent |
|---|---|---|---|
| 1 | USA | Georgetown University (Walsh) | 60.53 |
| 2 | USA | Harvard University (Kennedy) | 49.43 |
| 3 | USA | Johns Hopkins University (SAIS) | 48.30 |
| 4 | USA | Princeton University (Wilson) | 37.58 |
| 5 | USA | Columbia University (SIPA) | 37.45 |
| 6 | USA | Tufts University (Fletcher) | 30.90 |
| 7 | USA | George Washington University (Elliott) | 29.38 |
| 8 | USA | American University | 21.06 |
| 9 | UK | London School of Economics | 18.16 |
| 10 | USA | University of Chicago (CIR) | 13.75 |
| 11 | USA | Stanford University (Dorsey) | 9.08 |
| 12 | UK | University of Oxford | 8.07 |
| 13 | USA | Yale University | 7.82 |
| 14 | USA | University of Denver | 7.31 |
| 15 | USA | University of California, San Diego | 5.42 |
| 16 | USA | Syracuse University (Maxwell) | 4.67 |
| 17 | UK | University of Cambridge | 3.78 |
| 18 | USA | Massachusetts Institute of Technology | 3.28 |
| 18 | USA | University of Michigan | 3.28 |
| 20 | USA | University of California, Berkeley | 2.40 |
| 20 | USA | University of Pittsburgh | 2.40 |
| 22 | USA | New York University (Center for Global Affairs) | 2.14 |
| 22 | France | Sciences Po-Paris | 2.14 |
| 24 | USA | Duke University (Sanford) | 1.77 |
| 25 | UK | School of Oriental and African Studies | 1.53 |

Ph.D. programs
| Rank | Country | School | Percent |
|---|---|---|---|
| 1 | USA | Harvard University | 62.51 |
| 2 | USA | Princeton University | 53.17 |
| 3 | USA | Stanford University | 48.76 |
| 4 | USA | Columbia University | 32.44 |
| 5 | USA | Yale University | 21.80 |
| 6 | USA | University of Chicago | 21.37 |
| 7 | USA | University of California, San Diego | 16.00 |
| 8 | USA | University of Michigan | 15.68 |
| 9 | USA | Massachusetts Institute of Technology | 13.43 |
| 10 | USA | University of California, Berkeley | 12.03 |
| 11 | UK | University of Oxford | 8.59 |
| 12 | USA | Cornell University | 7.30 |
| 13 | UK | London School of Economics | 6.66 |
| 14 | USA | The Ohio State University | 5.48 |
| 15 | USA | Georgetown University | 5.37 |
| 16 | UK | University of Cambridge | 4.51 |
| 17 | USA | Johns Hopkins University | 4.08 |
| 18 | USA | George Washington University | 3.22 |
| 19 | USA | New York University (Center for Global Affairs) | 2.69 |
| 19 | USA | University of Wisconsin–Madison | 2.69 |
| 21 | USA | University of Minnesota | 2.26 |
| 22 | USA | American University | 2.15 |
| 22 | USA | Duke University | 2.15 |
| 22 | USA | University of Rochester | 2.15 |
| 25 | USA | University of California, Los Angeles | 2.04 |

== 2014 Rankings ==
Undergraduate programs
| Rank | Country | School | Percent |
|---|---|---|---|
| 1 | USA | Harvard University | 46.20 |
| 2 | USA | Princeton University | 39.14 |
| 3 | USA | Stanford University | 33.02 |
| 4 | USA | Georgetown University | 28.06 |
| 5 | USA | Columbia University | 24.37 |
| 6 | USA | University of Chicago | 19.62 |
| 7 | USA | Yale University | 18.67 |
| 8 | USA | George Washington University | 11.39 |
| 9 | USA | American University | 9.92 |
| 10 | USA | University of Michigan | 9.49 |
| 11 | USA | University of California, Berkeley | 8.54 |
| 12 | USA | Dartmouth College | 8.23 |
| 13 | USA | University of California, San Diego | 7.70 |
| 14 | USA | Tufts University | 7.07 |
| 15 | USA | Cornell University | 6.43 |
| 16 | USA | Johns Hopkins University | 6.12 |
| 17 | USA | Massachusetts Institute of Technology | 5.06 |
| 18 | USA | College of William & Mary | 4.54 |
| 19 | USA | Swarthmore College | 3.48 |
| 20 | USA | Williams College | 2.95 |
| 21 | USA | University of California, Los Angeles | 2.85 |
| 22 | USA | Brown University | 2.74 |
| 22 | USA | University of Virginia | 2.74 |
| 24 | USA | Ohio State University | 2.64 |
| 25 | USA | Duke University | 2.22 |

Master's programs
| Rank | Country | School | Percent |
|---|---|---|---|
| 1 | USA | Georgetown University | 58.61 |
| 2 | USA | Johns Hopkins University | 47.76 |
| 3 | USA | Harvard University | 46.31 |
| 4 | USA | Princeton University | 33.33 |
| 5 | USA | Columbia University | 31.21 |
| 6 | USA | Tufts University | 29.08 |
| 7 | USA | George Washington University | 26.06 |
| 8 | USA | American University | 17.11 |
| 9 | UK | London School of Economics | 13.42 |
| 10 | USA | Stanford University | 5.37 |
| 11 | USA | University of Denver | 5.15 |
| 12 | USA | University of Chicago | 5.03 |
| 13 | USA | University of California, San Diego | 4.70 |
| 14 | UK | University of Oxford | 4.47 |
| 15 | USA | Yale University | 3.91 |
| 16 | USA | Syracuse University (Maxwell) | 3.13 |
| 17 | USA | University of California, Berkeley | 2.57 |
| 18 | USA | University of Cambridge | 2.35 |
| 19 | USA | University of Pittsburgh | 1.79 |
| 20 | USA | Massachusetts Institute of Technology | 1.68 |
| 21 | USA | Monterey Institute of Int'l Studies | 1.45 |
| 21 | France | Sciences Po—Paris | 1.45 |
| 21 | USA | University of Michigan | 1.45 |
| 24 | Switzerland | Geneva Graduate Institute | 1.12 |
| 24 | USA | New York University | 1.12 |
| 24 | USA | Texas A&M University | 1.12 |

Ph.D. programs
| Rank | Country | School | Percent |
|---|---|---|---|
| 1 | USA | Harvard University | 62.51 |
| 2 | USA | Princeton University | 53.17 |
| 3 | USA | Stanford University | 48.76 |
| 4 | USA | Columbia University | 32.44 |
| 5 | USA | Yale University | 21.80 |
| 6 | USA | University of Chicago | 21.37 |
| 7 | USA | University of California, San Diego | 16.00 |
| 8 | USA | University of Michigan | 15.68 |
| 9 | USA | Massachusetts Institute of Technology | 13.43 |
| 10 | USA | University of California, Berkeley | 12.03 |
| 11 | UK | University of Oxford | 8.59 |
| 12 | USA | Cornell University | 7.30 |
| 13 | UK | London School of Economics | 6.66 |
| 14 | USA | Ohio State University | 5.48 |
| 15 | USA | Georgetown University | 5.37 |
| 16 | UK | University of Cambridge | 4.51 |
| 17 | USA | Johns Hopkins University | 4.08 |
| 18 | USA | George Washington University | 3.22 |
| 19 | USA | New York University | 2.69 |
| 19 | USA | University of Wisconsin—Madison | 2.69 |
| 21 | USA | University of Minnesota | 2.26 |
| 22 | USA | American University | 2.15 |
| 22 | USA | Duke University | 2.15 |
| 22 | USA | University of Rochester | 2.15 |
| 25 | USA | University of California, Los Angeles | 2.04 |

== 2012 Rankings ==
Undergraduate programs
| Rank | Country | School | Percent |
|---|---|---|---|
| 1 | USA | Harvard University | 58 |
| 2 | USA | Princeton University (Wilson) | 53 |
| 3 | USA | Stanford University | 39 |
| 4 | USA | Columbia University | 34 |
| 5 | USA | Georgetown University (Walsh) | 33 |
| 6 | USA | Yale University (Jackson) | 28 |
| 7 | USA | University of Chicago | 21 |
| 8 | USA | Dartmouth College | 15 |
| 9 | USA | George Washington University (Elliott) | 13 |
| 10 | USA | American University (SIS) | 11 |
| 11 | USA | University of California, Berkeley | 10 |
| 12 | USA | Cornell University | 9 |
| 13 | USA | University of Michigan (Ford) | 8 |
| 14 | USA | Tufts University | 7 |
| 14 | USA | Williams College | 7 |
| 14 | USA | Johns Hopkins University | 7 |
| 14 | USA | Swarthmore College | 7 |
| 18 | USA | Duke University | 6 |
| 19 | USA | Brown University | 6 |
| 20 | USA | University of California, San Diego | 5 |

Master's programs
| Rank | Country | School | Percent |
|---|---|---|---|
| 1 | USA | Georgetown University (Walsh) | 69 |
| 2 | USA | Johns Hopkins University (SAIS) | 60 |
| 3 | USA | Harvard University (Kennedy) | 57 |
| 4 | USA | Princeton University (Wilson) | 44 |
| 5 | USA | Tufts University (Fletcher) | 41 |
| 6 | USA | Columbia University (SIPA) | 40 |
| 7 | USA | George Washington University (Elliott) | 38 |
| 8 | USA | American University (SIS) | 20 |
| 9 | UK | London School of Economics | 12 |
| 10 | USA | University of Chicago (CIR) | 8 |
| 11 | USA | University of Denver (Korbel) | 7 |
| 12 | USA | Stanford University (Dorsey) | 6 |
| 13 | USA | Yale University (Jackson) | 6 |
| 14 | USA | Syracuse University (Maxwell) | 5 |
| 15 | USA | University of California, San Diego | 4 |
| 16 | USA | Massachusetts Institute of Technology | 4 |
| 16 | UK | Oxford University | 4 |
| 18 | USA | University of California, Berkeley (Goldman) | 3 |
| 19 | USA | New York University (PoliSci Dept) | 2 |
| 19 | USA | University of Michigan (Ford) | 2 |

Ph.D. programs
| Rank | Country | School | Percent |
|---|---|---|---|
| 1 | USA | Harvard University (Govt Dept) | 70 |
| 2 | USA | Princeton University (Wilson) | 62 |
| 3 | USA | Stanford University | 54 |
| 4 | USA | Columbia University | 44 |
| 5 | USA | Yale University | 27 |
| 6 | USA | University of Chicago | 27 |
| 7 | USA | University of California, San Diego | 21 |
| 8 | USA | University of California, Berkeley | 19 |
| 9 | USA | University of Michigan | 18 |
| 9 | USA | Massachusetts Institute of Technology | 18 |
| 11 | USA | Cornell University | 11 |
| 12 | UK | University of Oxford | 10 |
| 13 | UK | London School of Economics | 9 |
| 14 | USA | Georgetown University | 7 |
| 15 | USA | George Washington University | 7 |
| 16 | USA | Johns Hopkins University | 7 |
| 17 | UK | University of Cambridge | 7 |
| 18 | USA | The Ohio State University | 6 |
| 19 | USA | University of Rochester | 5 |
| 20 | USA | New York University | 4 |

== 2009 Rankings ==
Methodology note for 2009 rankings: Undergraduate programs were ranked by individual country in this particular survey. For full undergraduate listings, see the original survey.

Ph.D. programs

| Rank | Country | School | Percent |
|---|---|---|---|
| 1 | USA | Harvard University | 59 |
| 2 | USA | Princeton University | 42 |
| 3 | USA | Stanford University | 34 |
| 4 | USA | Columbia University | 31 |
| 5 | USA | Yale University | 20 |
| 6 | UK | London School of Economics | 19 |
| 7 | USA | University of Chicago | 18 |
| 8 | USA | University of Carlifonia-Berkeley | 14 |
| 8 | UK | Oxford University | 14 |
| 10 | USA | University of Michigan | 11 |
| 11 | USA | University of California, San Diego | 10 |
| 12 | USA | Massachusetts Institute of Technology | 10 |
| 13 | USA | Cornell University | 9 |
| 14 | UK | University of Wales, Aberystwyth | 7 |
| 15 | UK | Cambridge University | 7 |
| 16 | USA | Johns Hopkins University | 6 |
| 17 | USA | Georgetown University | 5 |
| 18 | USA | New York University | 3 |
| 19 | USA | University of California, Los Angeles | 3 |
| 20 | USA | University of Minnesota | 3 |
| 21 | USA | The Ohio State University | 3 |
| 22 | USA | University of Rochester | 3 |
| 23 | USA | Duke University | 3 |
| 24 | USA | Tufts University | 3 |
| 25 | Australia | Australian National University | 3 |

Master's programs

| Rank | Country | School | Percent |
|---|---|---|---|
| 1 | USA | Georgetown University (SFS) | 48 |
| 2 | USA | Johns Hopkins University (SAIS) | 44 |
| 3 | USA | Harvard University (HKS) | 43 |
| 4 | USA | Tufts University (Fletcher) | 29 |
| 4 | USA | Columbia University (SIPA) | 29 |
| 6 | USA | Princeton University (WWS) | 25 |
| 7 | UK | London School of Economics | 22 |
| 8 | USA | George Washington University (Elliott) | 16 |
| 9 | USA | American University (SIS) | 9 |
| 10 | UK | Oxford University | 9 |
| 11 | USA | University of Chicago (CIR) | 5 |
| 12 | USA | Yale University (Jackson) | 4 |
| 13 | USA | Syracuse University (Maxwell) | 4 |
| 14 | Canada | Carleton University (Paterson) | 4 |
| 15 | USA | Stanford University | 4 |
| 16 | UK | Cambridge University | 4 |
| 17 | UK | King's College London | 3 |
| 18 | USA | University of California, San Diego | 2 |
| 19 | USA | Massachusetts Institute of Technology | 2 |
| 19 | UK | University of Wales, Aberystwyth | 2 |
| 21 | USA | University of Denver (Korbel) | 2 |
| 22 | USA | University of California, Berkeley | 1 |
| 23 | USA | New York University | 1 |
| 24 | USA | University of Pittsburgh (GSPIA) | 1 |
| 24 | USA | University of Kentucky | 1 |

== 2007 Rankings ==
Methodology note for 2007 rankings: Only schools based in the United States were ranked in this particular survey.

Ph.D. programs

| Rank | School | Percent |
|---|---|---|
| 1 | Harvard University | 65 |
| 2 | Princeton University | 52 |
| 3 | Columbia University | 45 |
| 4 | Stanford University | 45 |
| 5 | University of Chicago | 30 |
| 6 | Yale University | 26 |
| 7 | University of California, Berkeley | 25 |
| 8 | University of Michigan | 22 |
| 9 | University of California, San Diego | 20 |
| 10 | Cornell University | 12 |
| 11 | Massachusetts Institute of Technology | 11 |
| 12 | Johns Hopkins University | 10 |
| 13 | Georgetown University | 8 |
| 14 | Duke University | 8 |
| 15 | The Ohio State University | 8 |
| 16 | New York University | 7 |
| 17 | University of Minnesota | 5 |
| 17 | University of California, Los Angeles | 5 |
| 19 | Tufts University | 4 |
| 20 | University of Rochester | 4 |

Master's programs

| Rank | School | Percent |
|---|---|---|
| 1 | Georgetown University | 65 |
| 2 | Johns Hopkins University | 64 |
| 3 | Harvard University | 46 |
| 4 | Tufts University | 42 |
| 5 | Columbia University | 39 |
| 6 | Princeton University | 38 |
| 7 | George Washington University | 28 |
| 8 | American University | 19 |
| 9 | University of Denver | 9 |
| 10 | Syracuse University | 7 |
| 11 | University of California, San Diego | 5 |
| 12 | University of Chicago | 4 |
| 12 | Yale University | 4 |
| 14 | Stanford University | 4 |
| 15 | University of Pittsburgh | 3 |
| 16 | University of California, Berkeley | 2 |
| 16 | University of Maryland | 2 |
| 18 | Massachusetts Institute of Technology | 2 |
| 18 | Monterey Institute of International Studies | 2 |
| 20 | University of Southern California | 2 |

Undergraduate programs

| Rank | School | Percent |
|---|---|---|
| 1 | Harvard University | 48 |
| 2 | Princeton University | 46 |
| 3 | Stanford University | 30 |
| 4 | Georgetown University | 28 |
| 5 | Columbia University | 28 |
| 6 | Yale University | 23 |
| 7 | University of Chicago | 21 |
| 8 | University of California, Berkeley | 12 |
| 9 | Dartmouth College | 11 |
| 10 | George Washington University | 10 |
| 11 | American University | 10 |
| 12 | University of Michigan | 9 |
| 13 | Tufts University | 8 |
| 14 | Swarthmore College | 8 |
| 14 | University of California, San Diego | 8 |
| 16 | Cornell University | 6 |
| 17 | Brown University | 6 |
| 18 | Williams College | 5 |
| 19 | Duke University | 5 |
| 19 | Johns Hopkins University | 5 |

== 2005 Rankings ==
Methodology note for 2005 rankings: Only the graduate programs of schools based in the United States were ranked in this particular survey.

Ph.D. programs

| Rank | School | Percent |
|---|---|---|
| 1 | Harvard University | 75 |
| 2 | Columbia University | 48 |
| 3 | Stanford University | 47 |
| 4 | Princeton University | 43 |
| 5 | University of Chicago | 36 |
| 6 | Yale University | 29 |
| 7 | University of Michigan | 28 |
| 8 | University of California, Berkeley | 27 |
| 9 | University of California, San Diego | 16 |
| 10 | Cornell University | 12 |
| 11 | Massachusetts Institute of Technology | 11 |
| 12 | Duke University | 10 |
| 13 | Johns Hopkins University | 9 |
| 14 | Georgetown University | 8 |
| 15 | The Ohio State University | 7 |
| 16 | University of Minnesota | 7 |
| 17 | University of California, Los Angeles | 6 |
| 18 | New York University | 6 |
| 19 | University of Rochester | 4 |
| 20 | Tufts University | 3 |

Master's programs

| Rank | School | Percent |
|---|---|---|
| 1 | Johns Hopkins University | 65 |
| 2 | Georgetown University | 62 |
| 3 | Harvard University | 47 |
| 4 | Tufts University | 45 |
| 5 | Columbia University | 45 |
| 6 | Princeton University | 39 |
| 7 | George Washington University | 26 |
| 8 | American University | 16 |
| 9 | Syracuse University | 7 |
| 10 | University of California, San Diego | 5 |
| 10 | University of Denver | 5 |
| 12 | Yale University | 5 |
| 13 | University of Chicago | 4 |
| 14 | University of Pittsburgh | 4 |
| 15 | University of Maryland | 3 |
| 16 | Massachusetts Institute of Technology | 2 |
| 16 | Stanford University | 2 |
| 18 | University of Kentucky | 2 |
| 19 | New York University | 2 |
| 19 | University of Southern California | 2 |
