= Musashino Junior College =

Coordinates: 35.866594°N 139.3844295°E

- 武蔵野短期大学
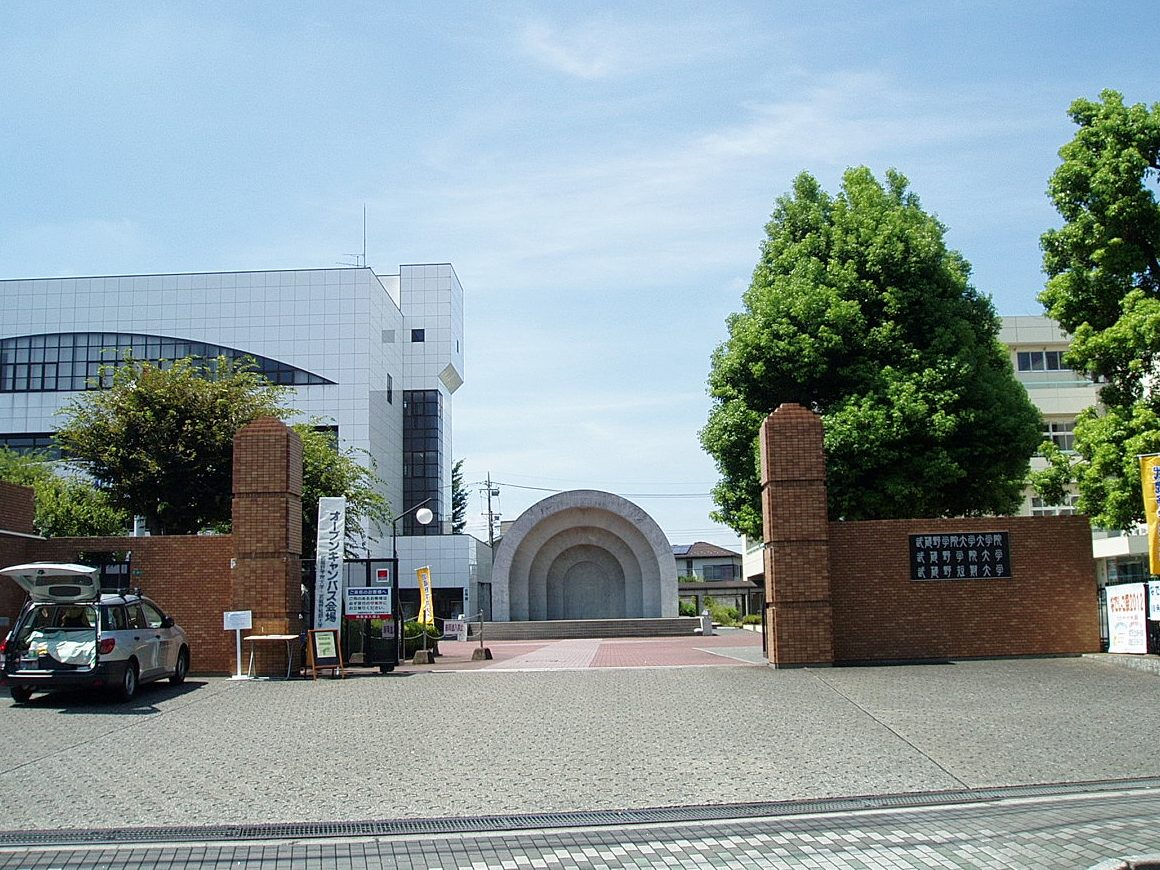
- Main gate to Musashino Gakuin University and Musashino Junior College, August 2012
- Type: Private junior women's college
- Established: 1981
- Faculty: Childcare
- Location: Sayama, Saitama, Japan
- Website: www.musashino.ac.jp/mjc/index.html

Musashino Junior College (武蔵野短期大学, Musashino Tanki Daigaku) is a private junior college in Sayama, Saitama, Japan.

== History ==
The school was founded in 1920 as Ōhashi Kasei Gakko (大橋家政学校). It was chartered as a college in 1981.

== Courses Offered ==
- Pedagogy

== See also ==
- Musashino Gakuin University
- List of junior colleges in Japan
