= Elliott School of International Affairs =

International relations school of George Washington University

Coordinates: 38.8961°N 77.0447°W

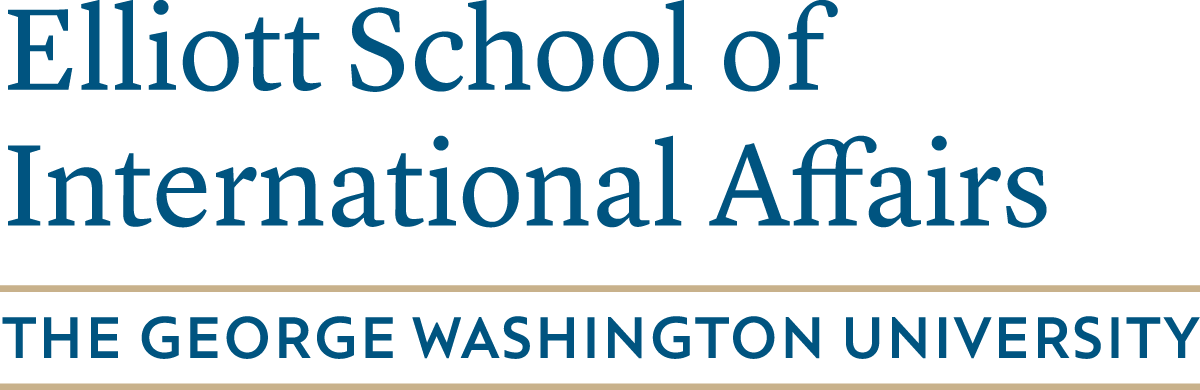
- Motto: Building Leaders for the World
- Type: Private
- Established: 1898
- Parent institution: The George Washington University
- Affiliations: APSIA
- Dean: Alyssa Ayres
- Undergraduates: 1,800
- Postgraduates: 600
- Location: Washington, D.C., U.S.
- Campus: Urban – Foggy Bottom
- Website: elliott.gwu.edu
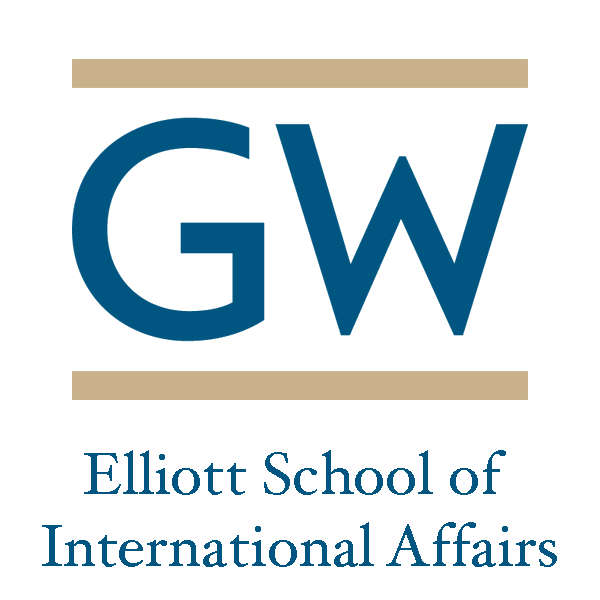

The Elliott School of International Affairs (known as the Elliott School or ESIA) is the professional school of international relations, foreign policy, and international development of the George Washington University, in Washington, D.C. It is the largest school of international relations in the United States.

The Elliott School is located across from the U.S. State Department and the Organization of American States, and closely to the White House, the World Bank, and the International Monetary Fund. It hosts the Institute for International Economic Policy and The Project on Forward Engagement.

Elliott School alumni and faculty have included ambassadors, diplomats, politicians, and public figures, including heads of state and government, U.S. senators, prominent politicians, NATO officials, U.N. ambassadors, and foreign ministers. Since January 2021, Alyssa Ayres has served as dean, the first woman to hold the post.

== History ==
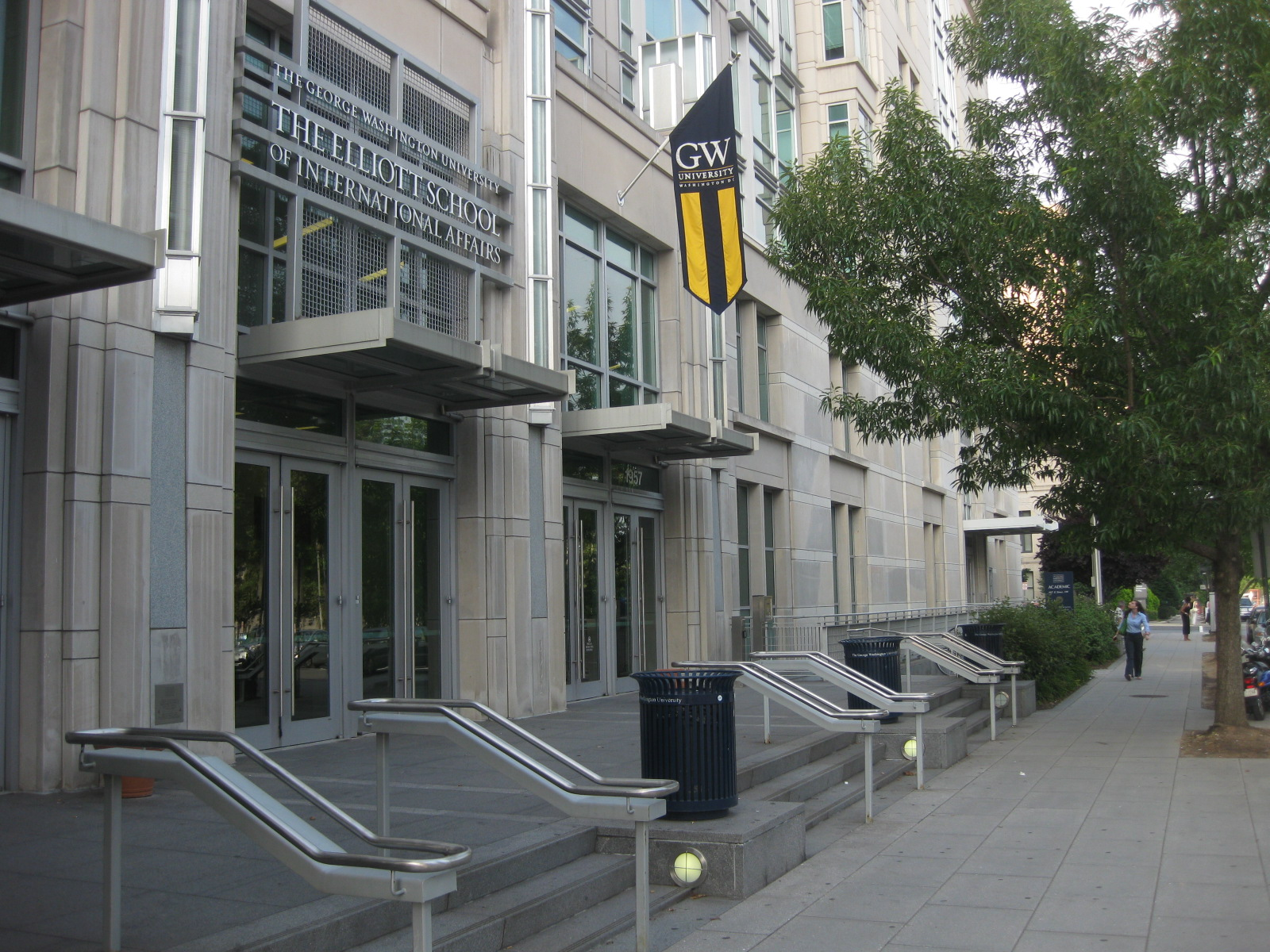
The Elliott School is located across the street from the U.S. Department of State, U.S. Department of the Interior, the American Red Cross headquarters, and the General Services Administration and only blocks away from the White House.

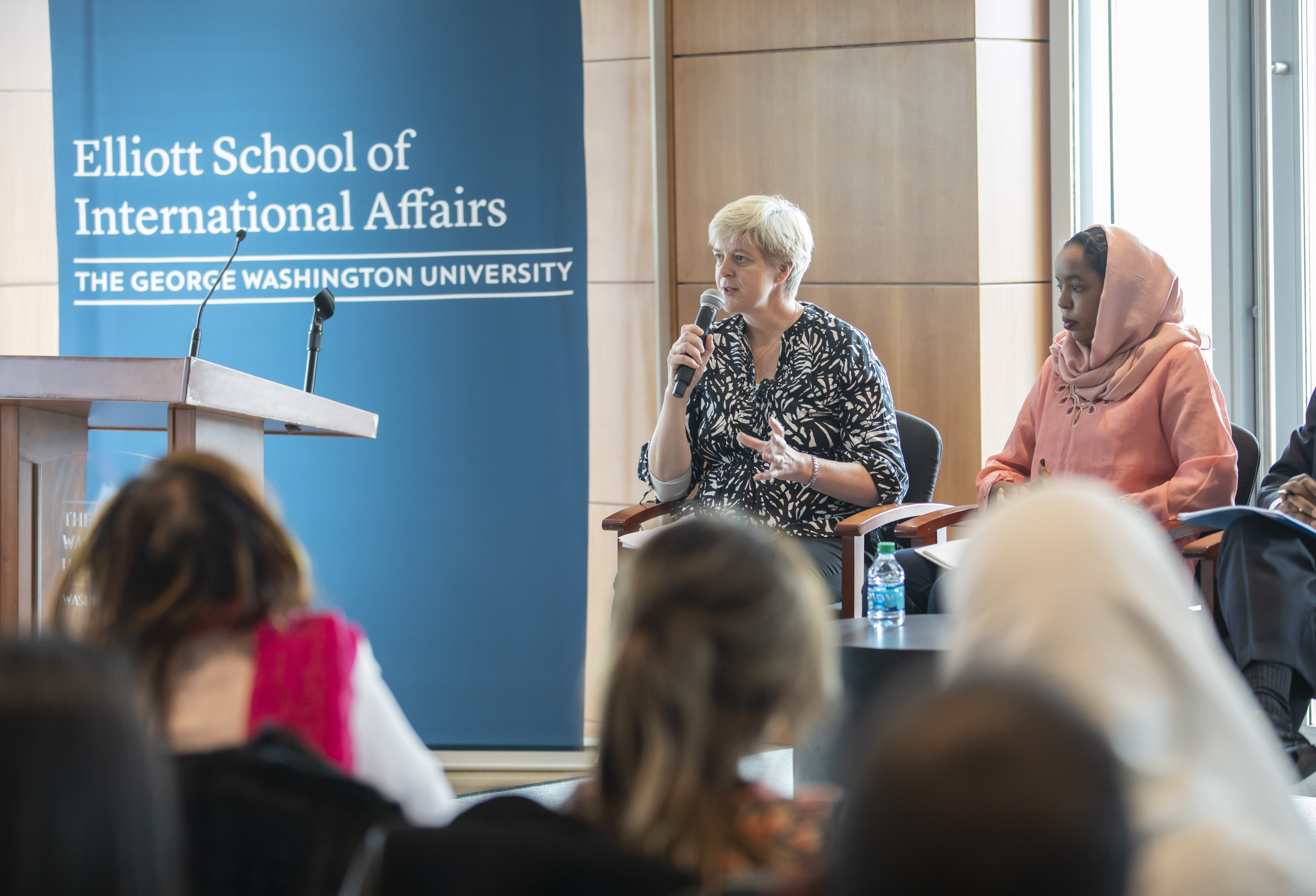
An Elliott School event with the 2019 International Women of Courage recipients.

The Elliott School traces its roots to 1898 when the George Washington University first offered studies in international affairs within the School of Comparative Jurisprudence and Diplomacy.

In 1905, the school was replaced with the Department of Politics and Diplomacy, which ran from 1905 to 1907. This department was expanded to include other fields of study and reconstituted as the College of the Political Sciences, a part of the university that operated from 1907 till 1913. At this point, the college was turned into an academic department within the Columbian College and renamed the Department of International Law and Diplomacy. This iteration of the Elliott School functioned from 1913 until 1928.

In 1928, the university once again reorganized its departments. It was in this year that the School of Government was created. This school had the longest run until then, as it remained a part of the university from 1928 till 1960. It was in 1960 that the fields of business and international affairs were added to the school of government, creating thus the School of Government, Business, and International Affairs, working from 1960 until 1966. Then, in 1966, President Lloyd Hartman Elliott split its faculties into a new School of Government and Business Administration (SGBA) and a new School of Public and International Affairs. Running from 1966 until 1987, it was once again renamed and became the School of International Affairs. It was then in 1988 when, in honor of President Elliott and his wife Evelyn, that the school acquired its present name and became the Elliott School of International affairs. At this point it was reorganized to focus exclusively on undergraduate, graduate, and mid-career education in international affairs.

In March 2003, the Elliott School opened its new academic building at 1957 E Street NW. The building was formally opened by then-Secretary of State and GW Alumnus Colin Powell. This building features state-of-the-art lecture halls, classrooms, offices, lounges, and common areas used to host public events. It is diagonally across from the Harry S Truman Building, the headquarters of the United States Department of State through a small park. The school is just east of the headquarters of the American Red Cross and across the road from the United States Office of Personnel Management.

Dr. Michael E. Brown served as Dean of the Elliott School, from 2005 to 2015, having previously served as Director of the Georgetown University Center for Peace and Security Studies and associate director of the Belfer Center for Science and International Affairs at Harvard University. From 2015 to 2020, the Dean of the Elliott School was Ambassador Reuben E. Brigety II, former U.S. Ambassador to the African Union and Deputy Assistant Secretary of State for African Affairs.

== Academics ==
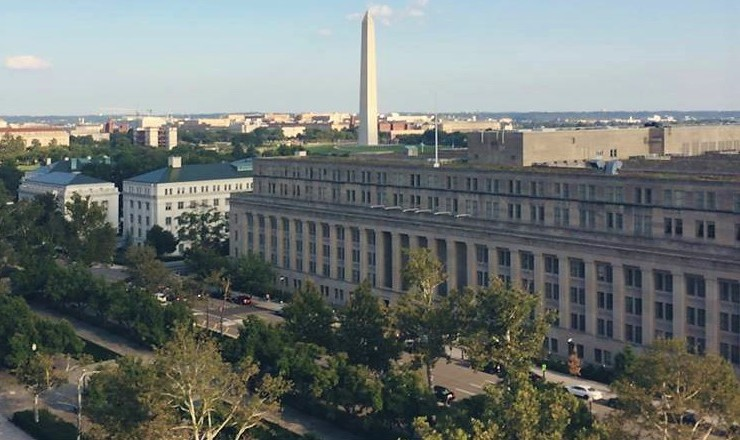
View from the Elliott School, with the Washington Monument in the back and the U.S. Department of the Interior & American Red Cross headquarters in the foreground.

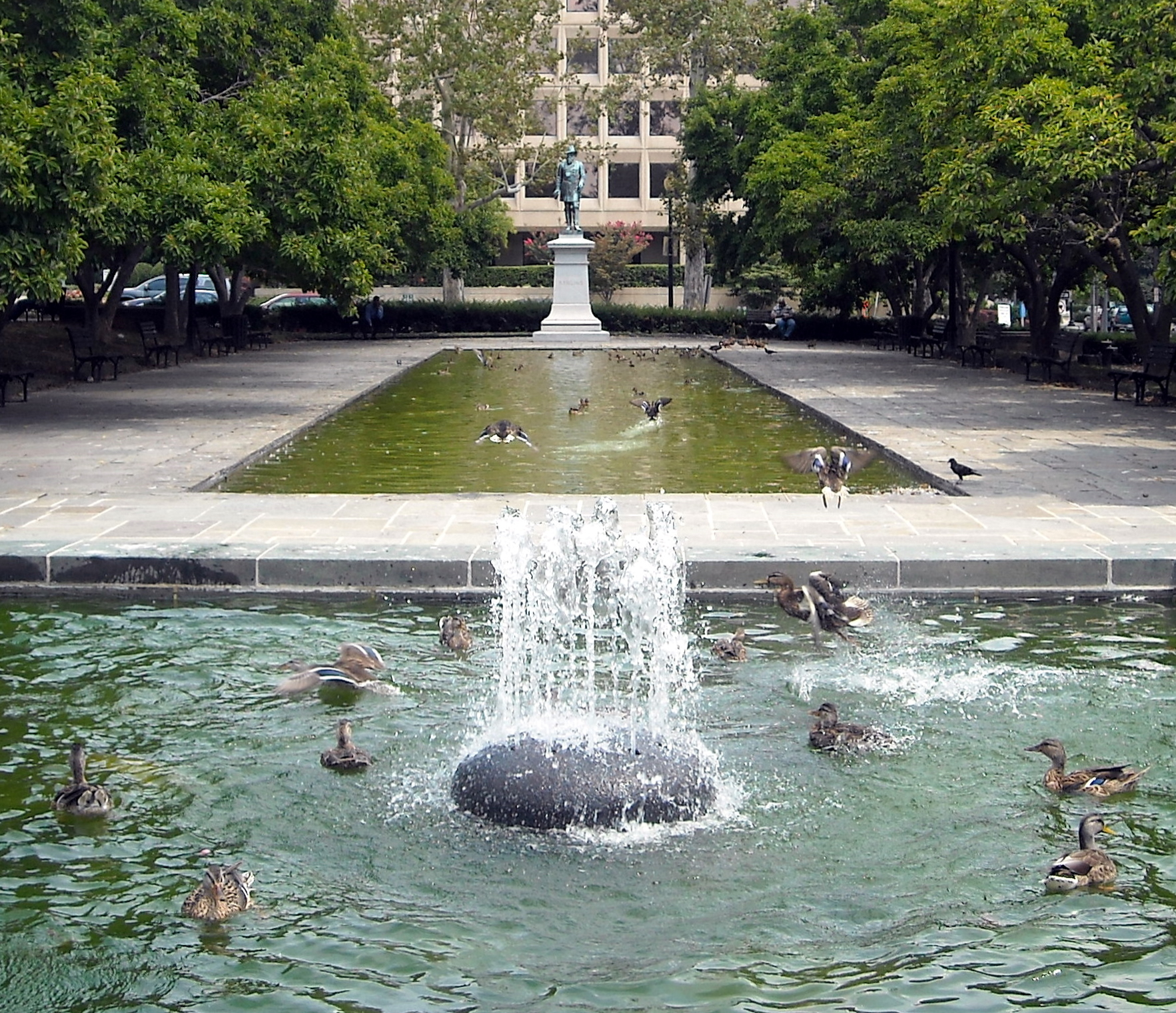
Rawlins Park sits between the Elliott School & the U.S. Department of the Interior.

=== Undergraduate programs ===
The Elliott School offers undergraduate degrees either as a Bachelor of Arts (B.A.) or Bachelor of Science (B.S.) in the following programs:

- Bachelor of International Affairs
- Bachelor of Asian Studies
- Bachelor of Middle Eastern Studies
- Bachelor of Latin American and Hemispheric Studies

The International Affairs major is further broken down by regional and functional concentrations. Functional concentrations include Security Policy, International Politics, Global Public Health, Conflict Resolution, Comparative Political, Economic & Social Systems, Contemporary Cultures & Societies, International Development Studies, International Economics, and International Environmental Resources. Regional concentrations include Africa, Asia, Europe & Eurasia, Latin America, and the Middle East.

=== Graduate programs ===
The School offers Master of Arts degrees in a variety of fields. There are two main categories of fields of study:

- Functional studies degrees:
  - Master of Global Communications
  - Master of International Affairs
  - Master of International Development Studies
  - Master of International Science & Technology Policy
  - Master of Security Policy Studies
  - Master of International Economic Policy
- Regional studies degrees:
  - Master of Asian Studies
  - Master of European & Eurasian Studies
  - Master of Latin American & Hemispheric Studies
  - Master of Middle East Studies

There are also two special programs besides the Master of Arts. One is for mid-career professionals, called a Master of International Policy and Practice (MIPP), while the other is a Master of International Studies (MIS) granted to graduate students attending Elliott School academic partner institutions abroad.

=== Joint and dual degrees ===
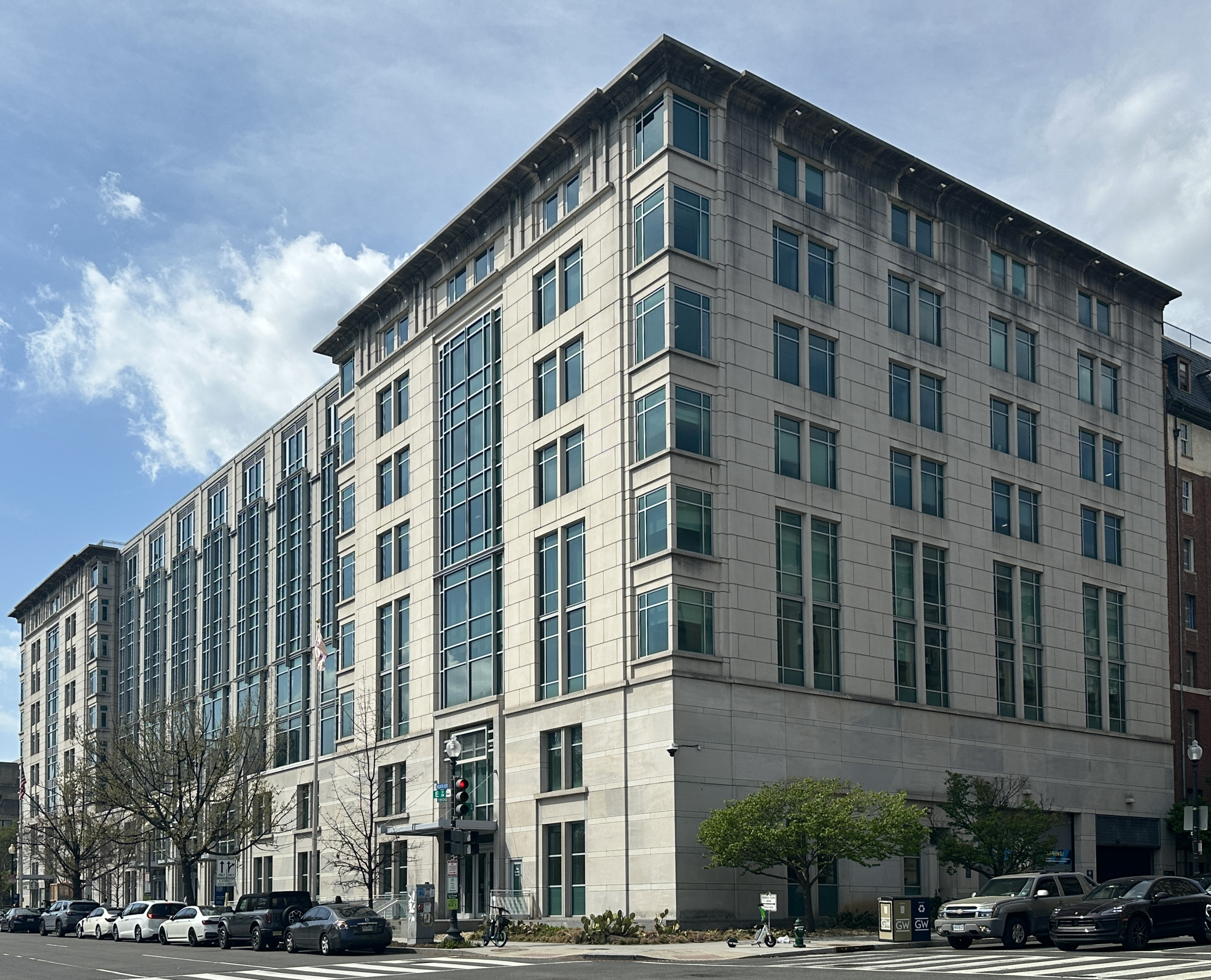
The current Elliott School building was inaugurated by then U.S. Secretary of State and GW alumnus Colin Powell in 2003.

There are also three joint and dual-degrees programs. The Elliott School and the School of Business offer a Master of Arts and Master of Business Administration program, while it partners with the Law School to grant a Master of Arts and Juris Doctor. The third program is a Master of Arts and Master of Public Health, in partnership with George Washington's School of Public Health and Health Services.

=== Certificates ===
- Global Gender Policy
- International Science and Technology Policy
- Nuclear Policy Studies

=== International studies ===
The school runs an independent study abroad program for its graduate students. As a part of its internationally focused education, it encourages graduate students to add an international component to their studies by living in a foreign country. The school believes that the experience is a key part of an education in international affairs because it increases understanding of the world by providing students with a variety of new and unexpected perspectives. The program functions as bilateral partnerships with a number of schools.

The undergraduate students also have the option of studying abroad during their time at the Elliott School. However, the undergraduate program utilizes GW's university-wide study abroad system. Thanks to that, these students have access to nearly 250 study abroad programs.

== Reputation and rankings ==
Elliott School rankings

World rankings
| Foreign Policy – Graduate Programs | 7th |

U.S. rankings
| Foreign Policy – Undergraduate Programs | 8th |

Foreign Policy ranked the Elliott School as being the 8th in the Top U.S. Undergraduate Institutions to Study International Relations 2018.

Foreign Policy ranked the Elliott School's Master in International Affairs as the 7th best in the world in its 2018 Inside the Ivory Tower annual report.

In 2009, a study carried out by researchers at the College of William and Mary found that the Elliott School had the 8th best terminal master's program in the world for those interested in policy careers in international affairs.

Foreign Policy ranked the Elliott School's doctoral programs as the 17th best in the world, out of 54 schools, in its 2018 Inside the Ivory Tower annual report.

QS World University Rankings listed the Elliott School in the "Politics & International Affairs" category as the 27th best school in the world, out of 201 schools.

The Elliott School's Master in International Affairs is ranked the best in the United States in MastersStudies' Best Masters Programs in International Affairs in the United States 2018.

NPSIA is a member of the Association of Professional Schools of International Affairs (APSIA), a group of public policy, public administration and international affairs schools.

== Research ==
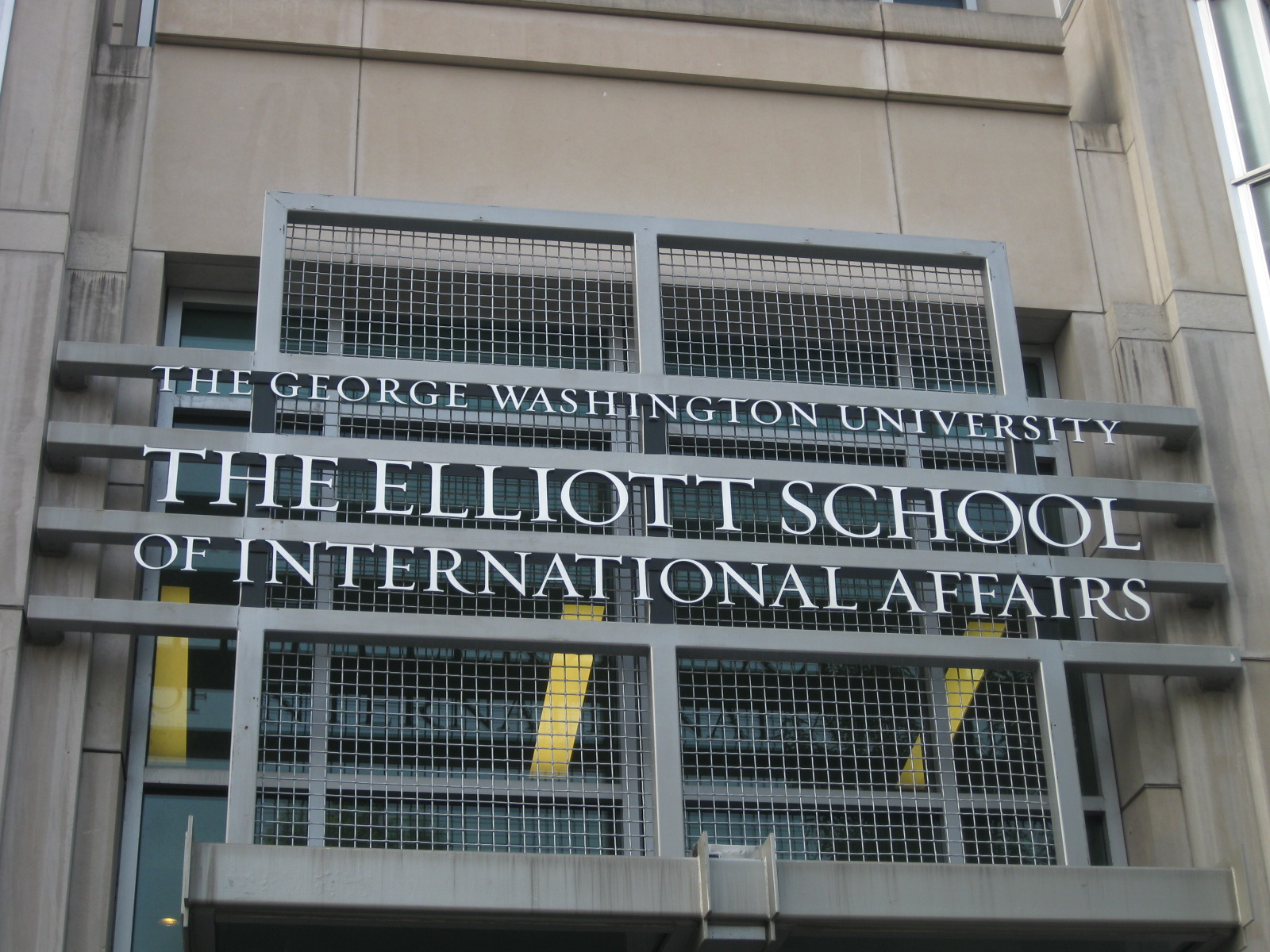
The Elliott School was named after Lloyd Hartman Elliott, 14th President of the George Washington University.

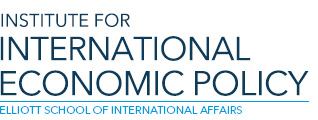
The Institute for International Economic Policy (IIEP) is one of the Elliott School's premier research institutes, collaborating with organizations like the World Bank Group and the International Monetary Fund.

As an integral part of its academic focus and mission, the Elliott School runs a large number of research institutes in a variety of issues. All are run by experts in their respective fields, who lead each institution's research initiatives, conferences, lectures, discussions and other activities.

The Elliott School is home to 10 research centers and institutes, that provide an institutional framework for scholars working in regional and topical fields of study, while more than 25 initiatives connect cross-curricular faculty and research to address critical global issues.

Centers and institutes, alongside research initiatives and projects, form Elliott School's scholarly and research arm, which seeks to advance understanding of important global issues and engaging the public and the policy community, both in the United States and internationally.

The Institute for International Economic Policy (IIEP) is one of the Elliott School's premier research institutes, collaborating with organizations like the World Bank Group and the International Monetary Fund frequently, which are both headquartered across the street from the Elliott School.

Adjunct professor Alistair Millar founded and runs the Global Center on Cooperative Security in Washington, as an initiative of the Fourth Freedom Forum.

Frank Ciluffo, Director of the GW Center for Cyber and Homeland Security, serves on its advisory board, which collaborates frequently with the Elliott School.

=== Publications ===
- International Affairs Review
- The Washington Quarterly

=== Centers and institutes ===
- Institute for International Economic Policy
- Institute for Public Diplomacy and Global Communication
- Institute for Security and Conflict Studies
- Institute for International Science and Technology Policy
- Institute for Global and International Studies
- Institute for Disaster and Fragility Resilience
- Institute for European, Russian, and Eurasian Studies
- Institute for Middle East Studies
- Institute for African Studies
- Institute for Korean Studies
- Sigur Center for Asian Studies
- Space Policy Institute

=== Research and policy programs ===
- The Project on Forward Engagement
- Brazil Initiative
- China Policy Program
- Culture in Global Affairs Program
- Gender Equity in International Affairs Initiative
- GW Diaspora Program
- GW Cold War Group
- Memory and Reconciliation in the Asia-Pacific
- Partnership for International Strategies in Asia
- Project on Humanitarian Governance
- Rising Powers Initiative
- Taiwan Education and Research Program
- US-Japan Legislative Exchange Program

== Notable people ==
=== Notable alumni ===
Many of the school's former students have gone on to distinguished careers in politics, diplomacy, and journalism, among numerous other fields. Some notable alumni include Kolinda Grabar-Kitarović (former President of Croatia), Chang Dae-whan (former Prime Minister of South Korea), Michael Punke (Vice President of Amazon Web Services and former U.S. Ambassador to the World Trade Organization), Admiral John B. Hayes (16th Commandant of the Coast Guard; MA '64), General John M. Shalikashvili (Supreme Allied Commander and Chairman of the Joint Chiefs of Staff; MA '70), Rose Gottemoeller (Deputy General of the NATO; MA '81), Ciarán Devane (Chief Executive of the British Council) Robert P. Jackson (U.S. Ambassador to Ghana and Cameroon), Kurt Volker (U.S. Ambassador to NATO; MA '87), David A. Nadler (vice-chairman of Marsh & McLennan Companies), K. T. McFarland (Deputy National Security Advisor; BA '73), Sam Johnson (U.S. Congressman from Texas; MS '74), Kasie Hunt (MSNBC and NBC News correspondent; BA '06), Reona Ito (The American Prize-winning orchestral conductor), and Diana B. Henriques (Pulitzer Prize finalist and The New York Times journalist; BA '69), among numerous others.

Notable Alumni of the Elliott School

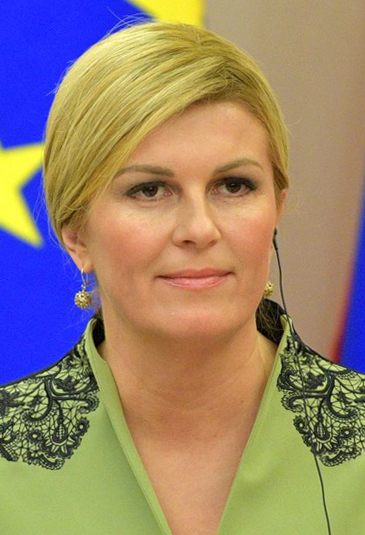
Kolinda Grabar-Kitarović F.S. '03
Former President of Croatia (2015–2020)

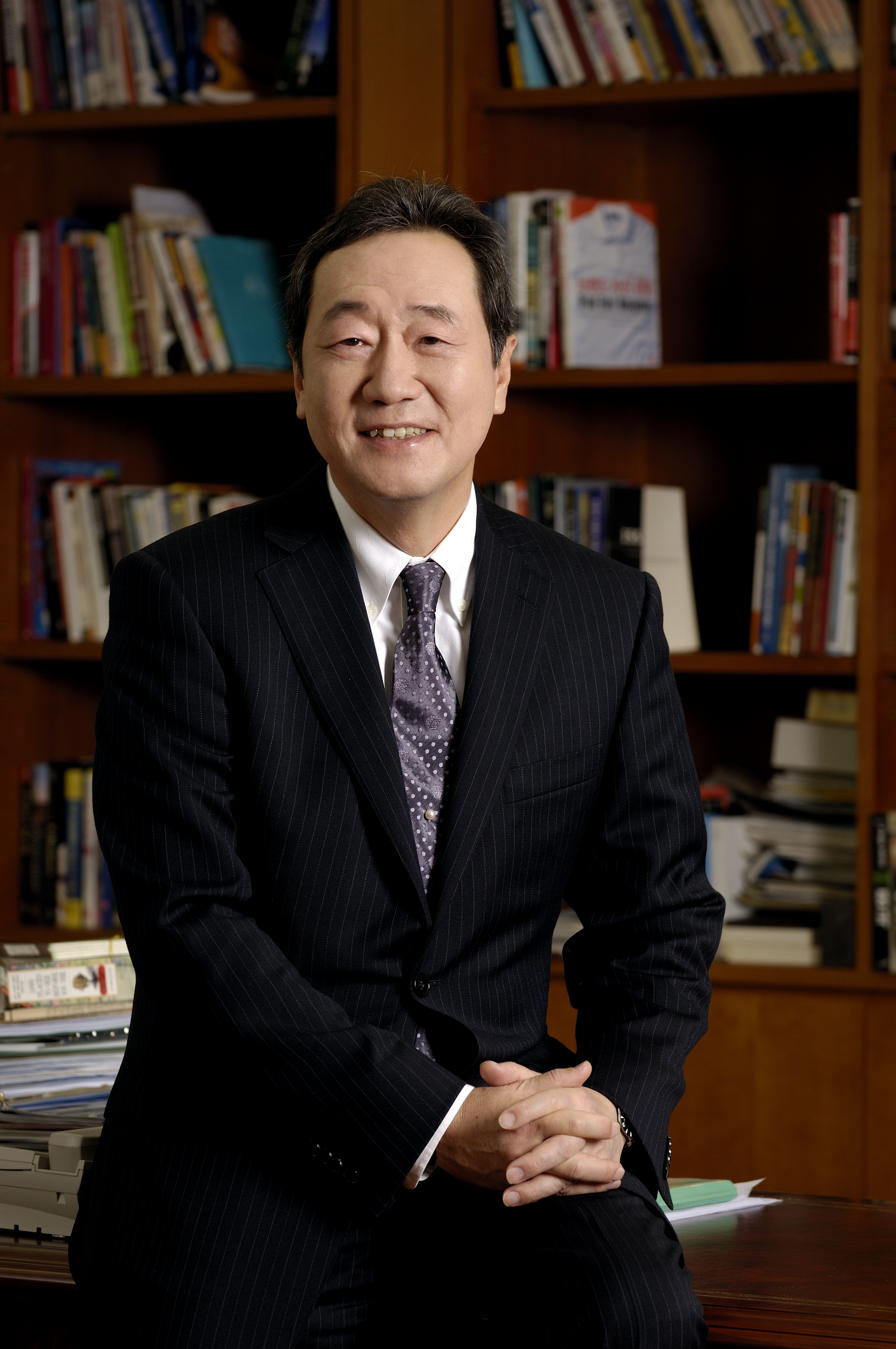
Chang Dae-whan MA '76
Prime Minister of South Korea

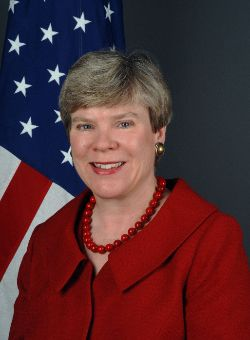
Rose Gottemoeller MA '81
16th Deputy Secretary General of NATO

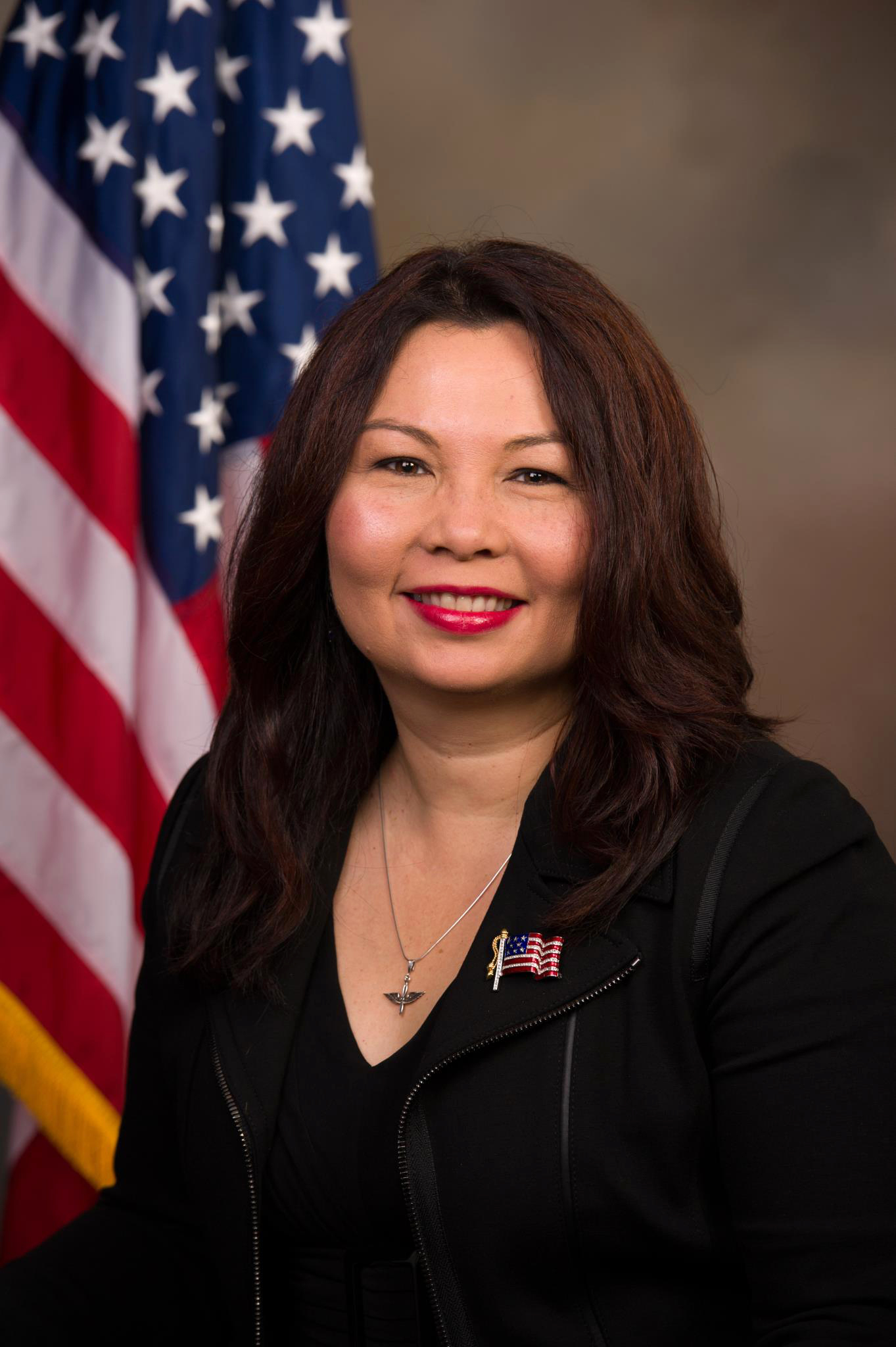
Tammy Duckworth MA '96
U.S. Senator from Illinois

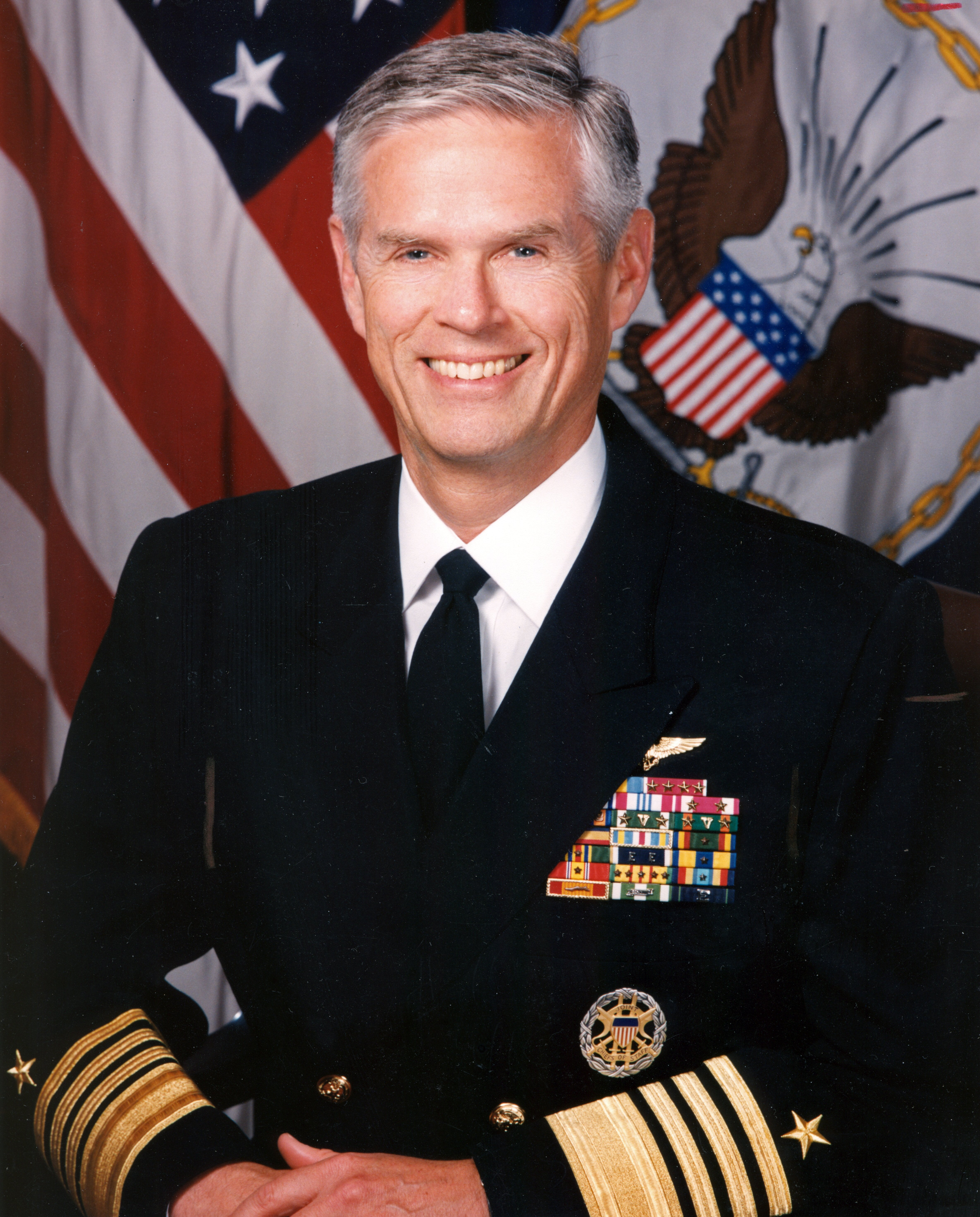
Joseph Prueher MA '69
U.S. Ambassador to China

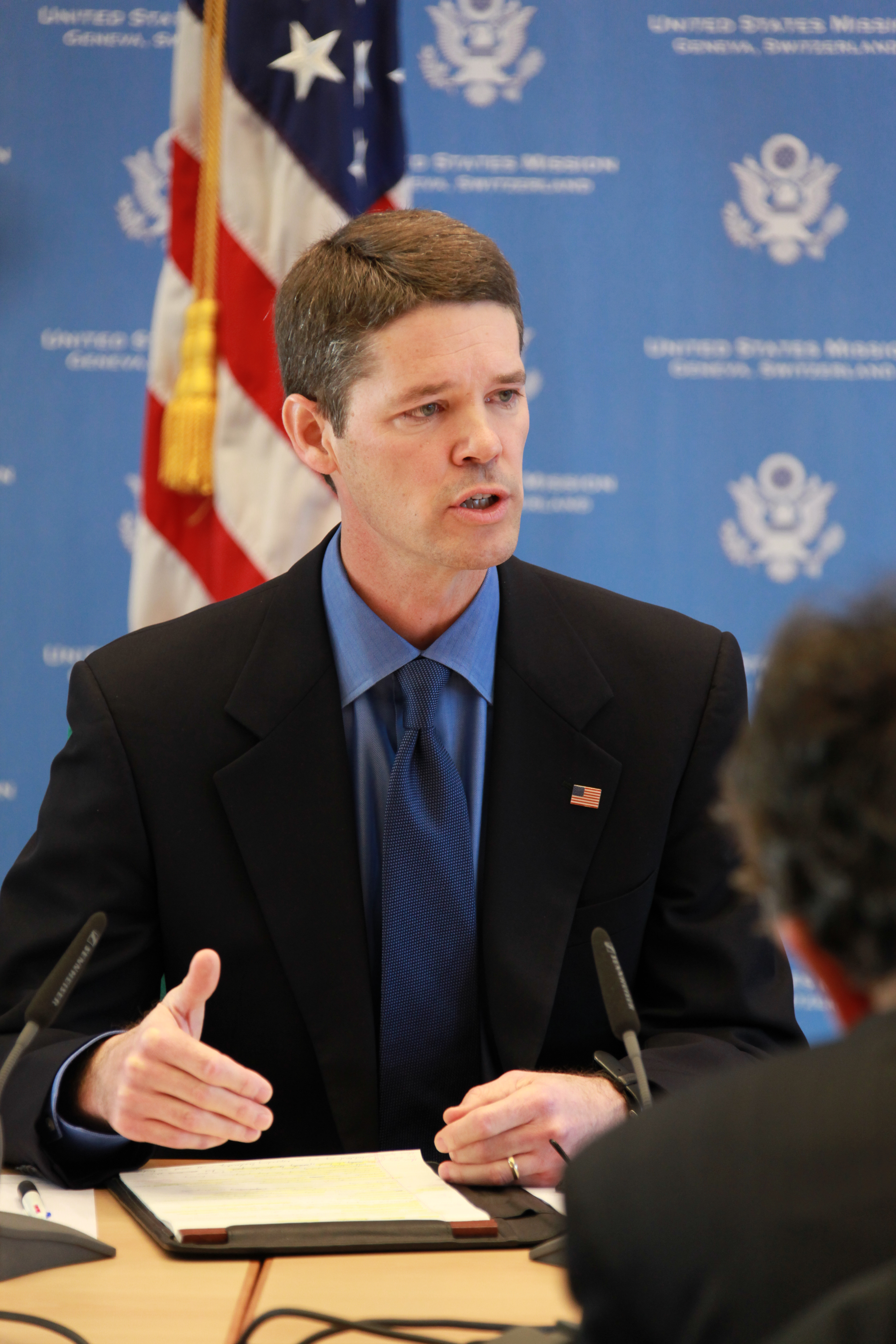
Michael Punke BA '86
U.S. Ambassador to WTO

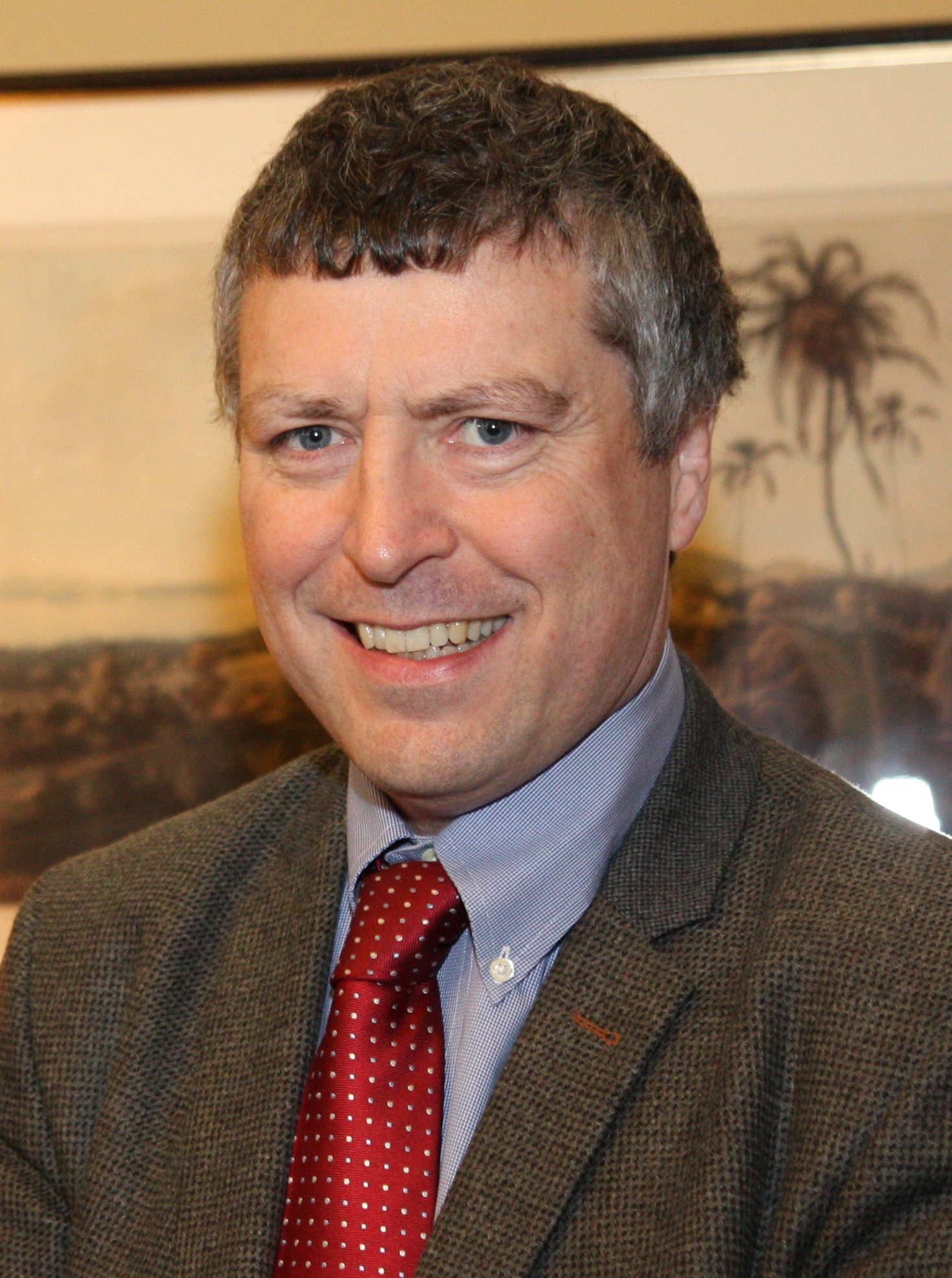
Ciarán Devane MIPP '06, CEO of the British Council

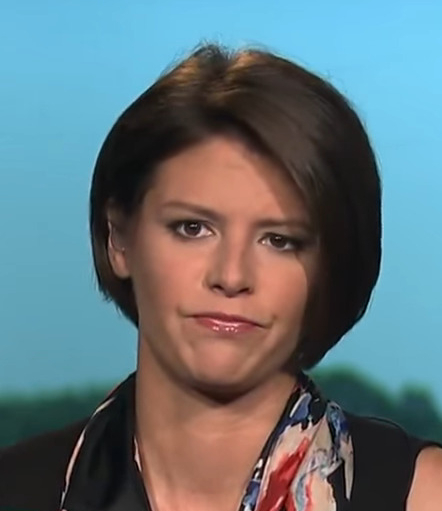
Kasie Hunt BA '06
NBC News correspondent & host of MSNBC's Kasie DC

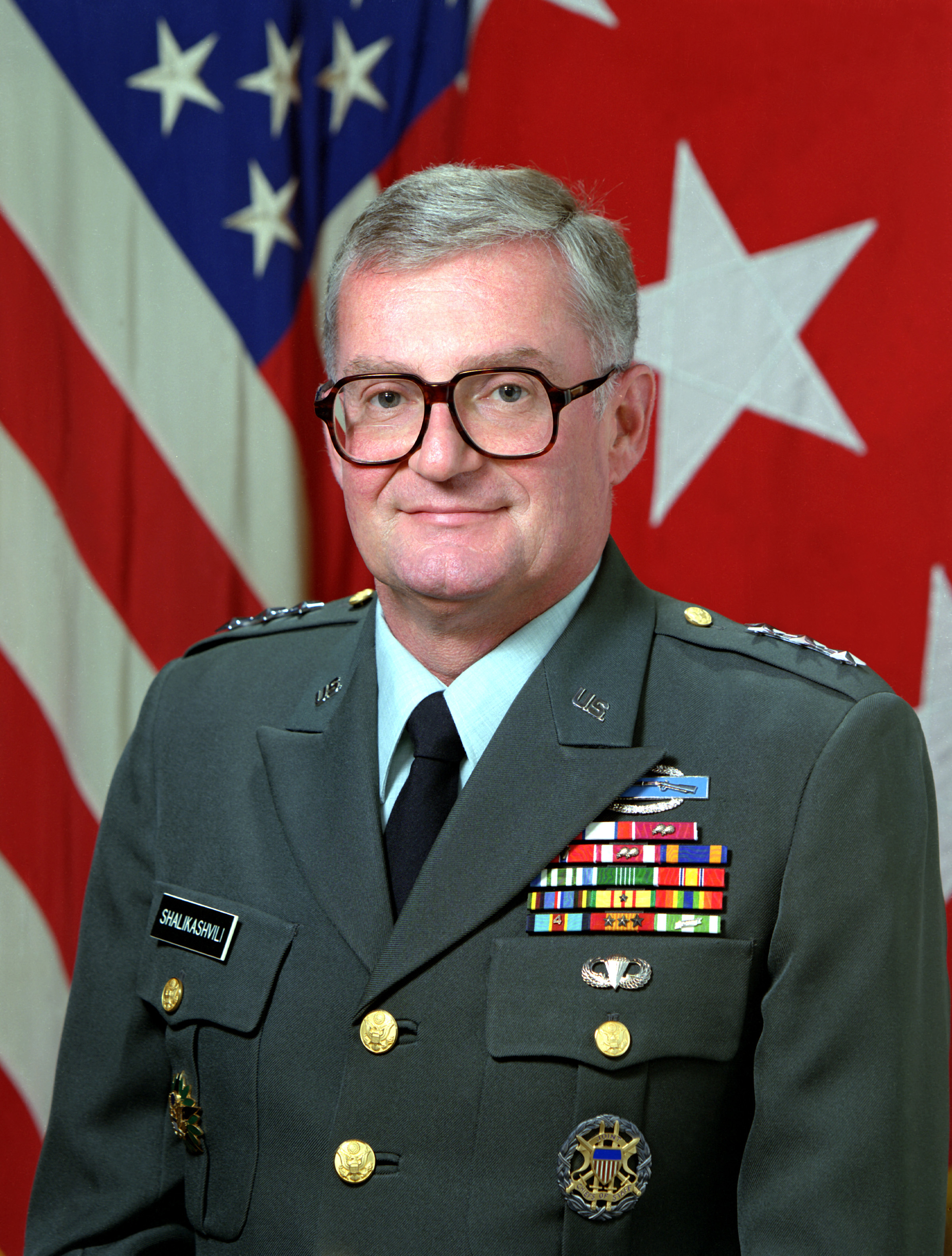
John Shalikashvili MA '70
Supreme Allied Commander

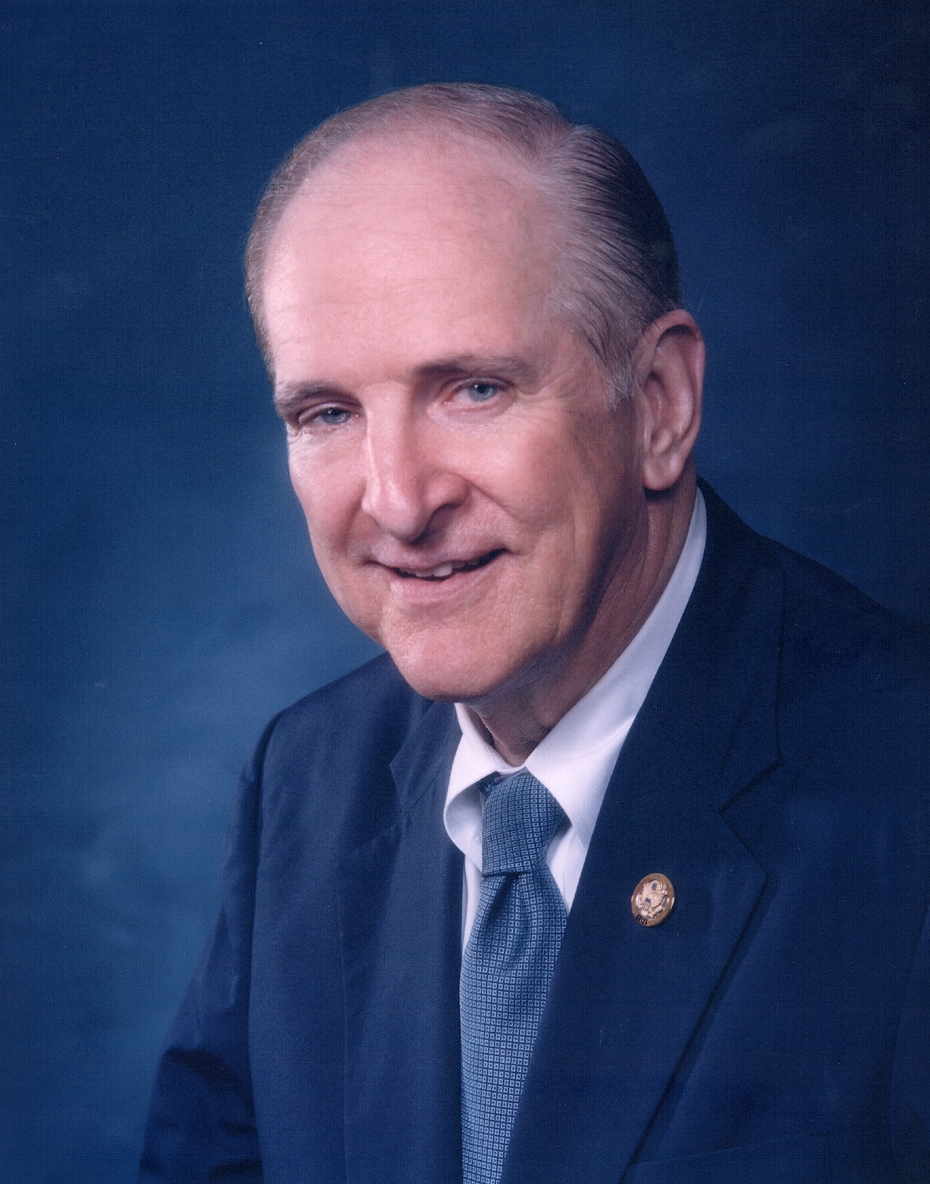
Sam Johnson MS '76
U.S. Congressman from Texas

=== Notable faculty ===
Notable current faculty members include Amitai Etzioni (former president of the American Sociological Association), Thomas E. McNamara (former Assistant Secretary of State for Political-Military Affairs), Marc Lynch (Senior Fellow at the Center for a New American Security), Scott Pace (current Executive Secretary of the National Space Council), Charles Glaser (famed Defensive Realist theorist), David Shambaugh (Senior Fellow at the Brookings Institution), Lawrence Wilkerson (former Chief of Staff to United States Secretary of State Colin Powell), Michael N. Barnett (famed Constructivist theorist), James N Rosenau (former president of the International Studies Association), Martha Finnemore (famed Constructivist theorist), Harry Harding (founding Dean of the Batten School of Leadership & Public Policy), Edward "Skip" Gnehm Jr. (former U.S. Ambassador to Jordan, Kuwait and Australia), James Foster (World Bank Board Advisor), Leon Fuerth (United States National Security Council member under President Bill Clinton), Eric Newsom (former Assistant Secretary of State for Political-Military Affairs), Stephen C. Smith (current Director of the Institute for International Economic Policy), Sabina Alkire (Director of the Oxford Poverty and Human Development Initiative), John Logsdon (former member of the NASA Advisory Council), and Nathan J. Brown (Board Advisor to the Project on Middle East Democracy).

Notable Faculty of the Elliott School

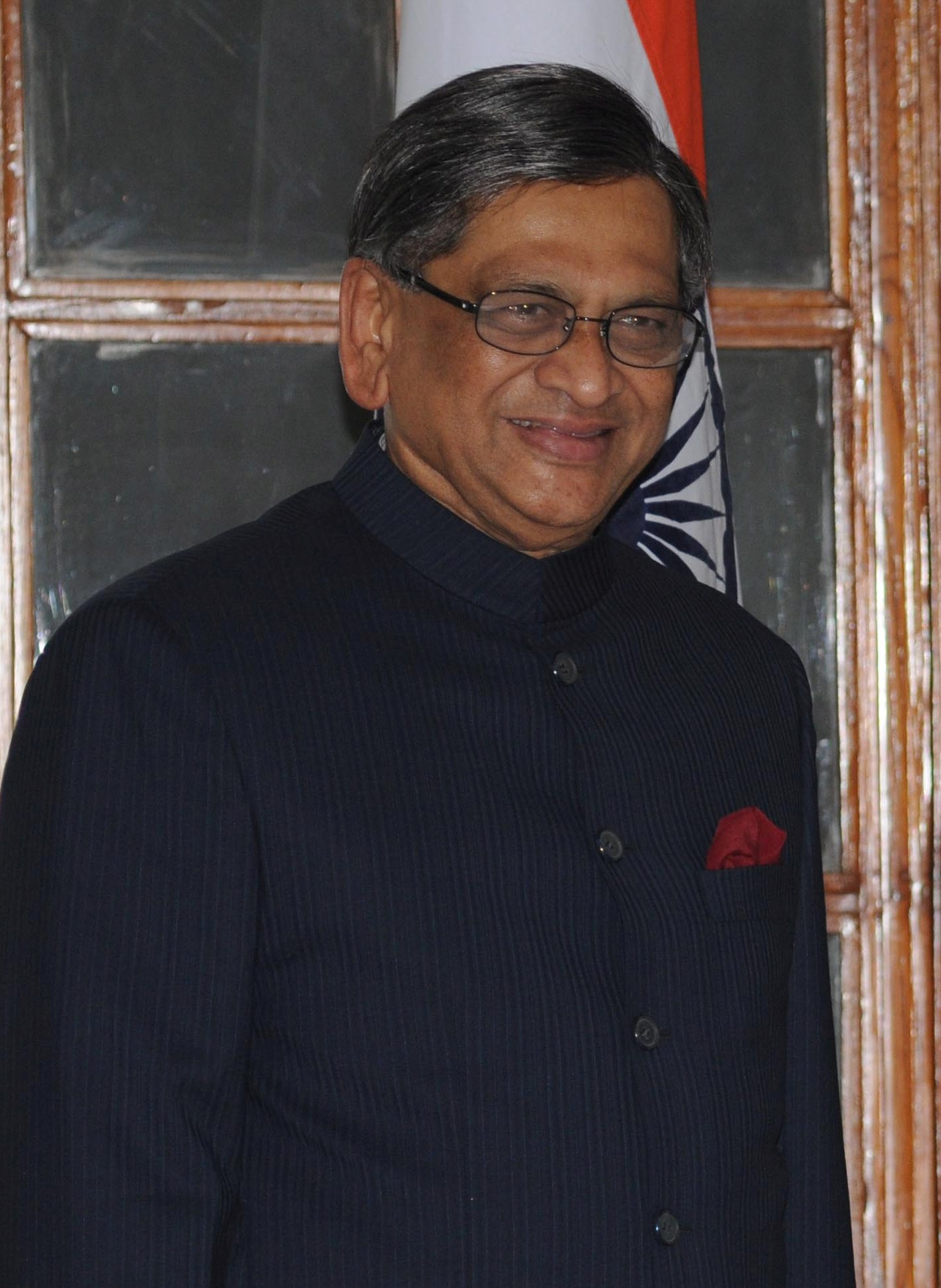
S. M. Krishna
Former Foreign Minister of India

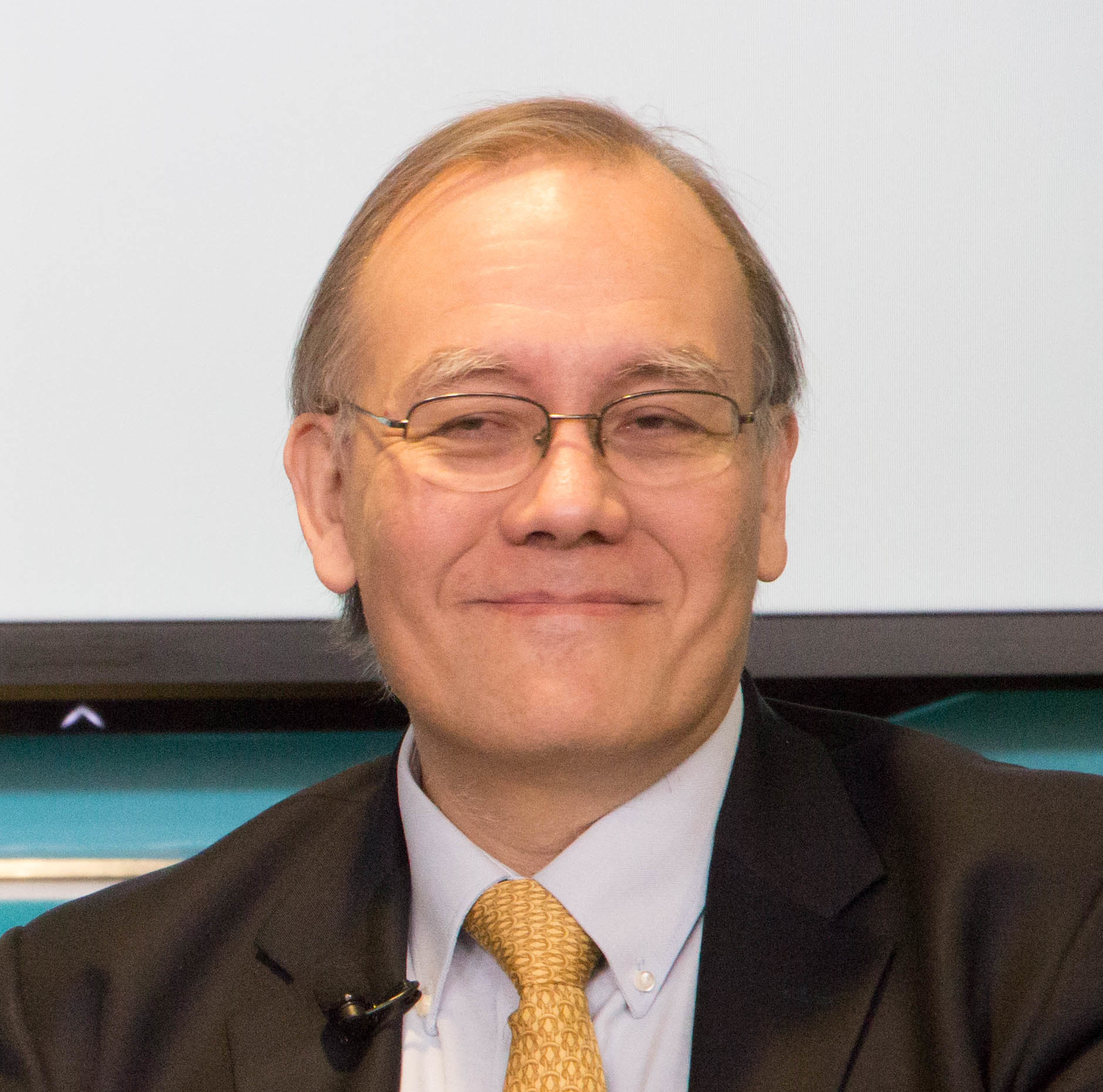
Scott Pace
Current Executive Secretary of the National Space Council

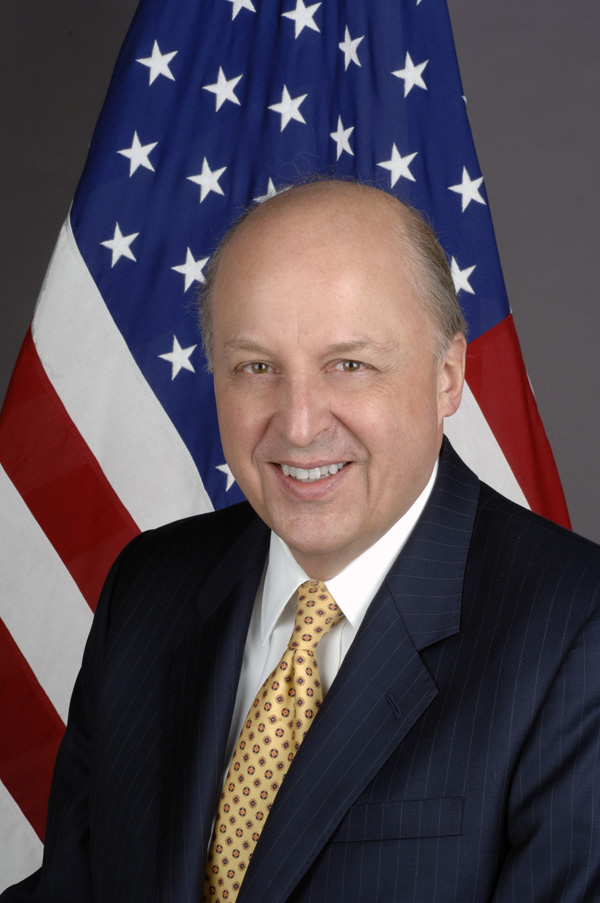
John Negroponte
1st Director of National Intelligence

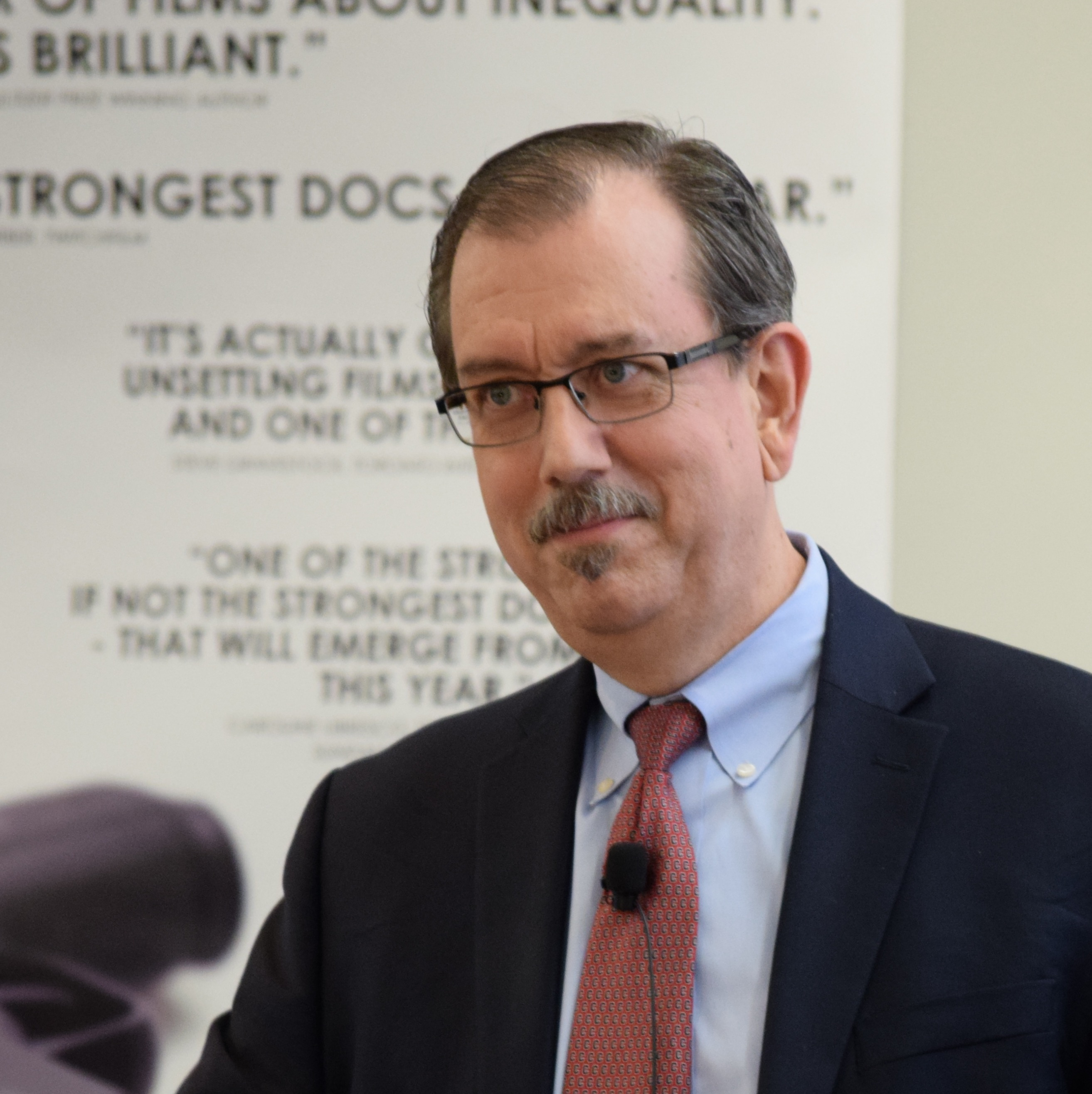
James Foster
Board member at the World Bank

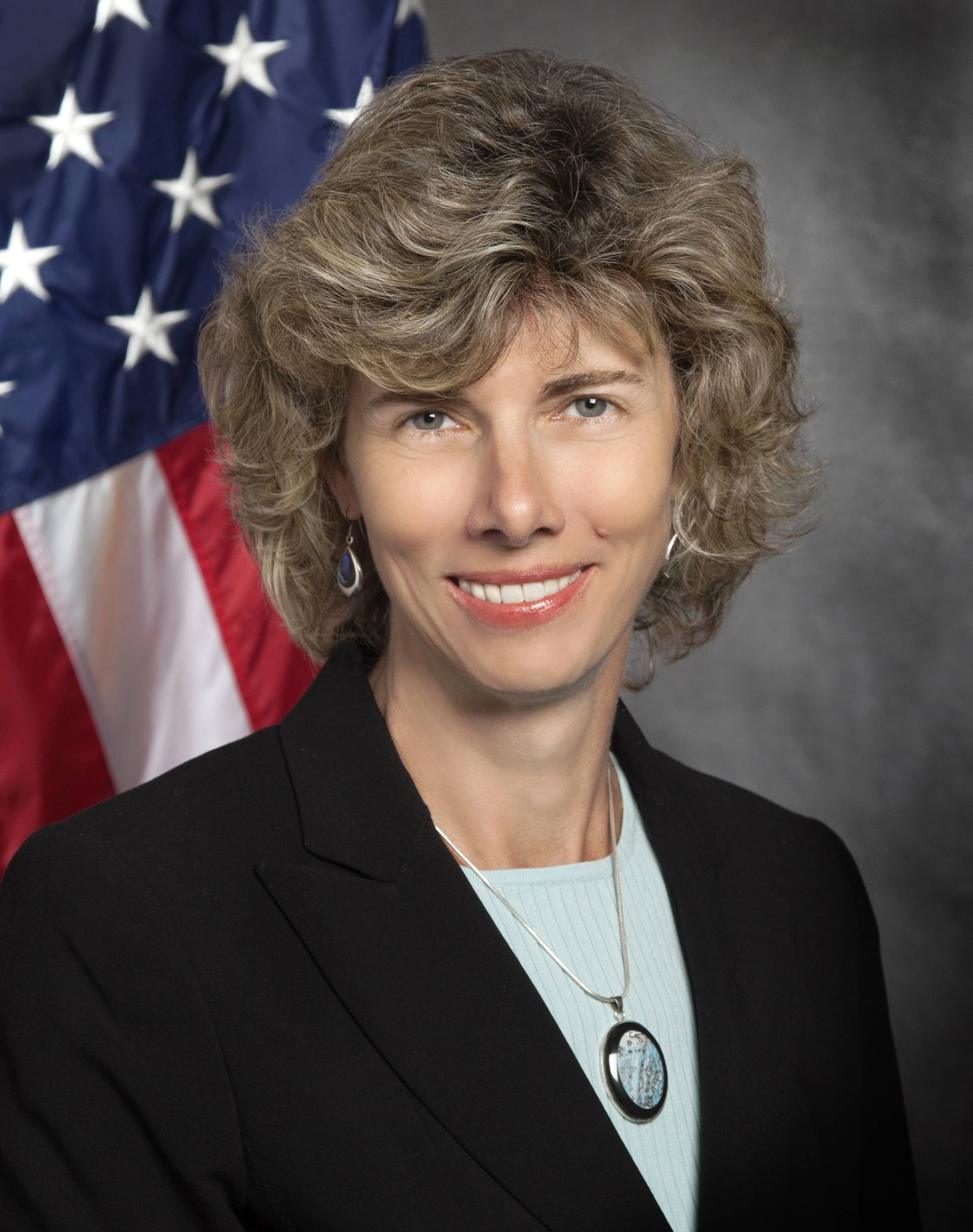
Allison Macfarlane
Chairwoman of the Nuclear Regulatory Commission

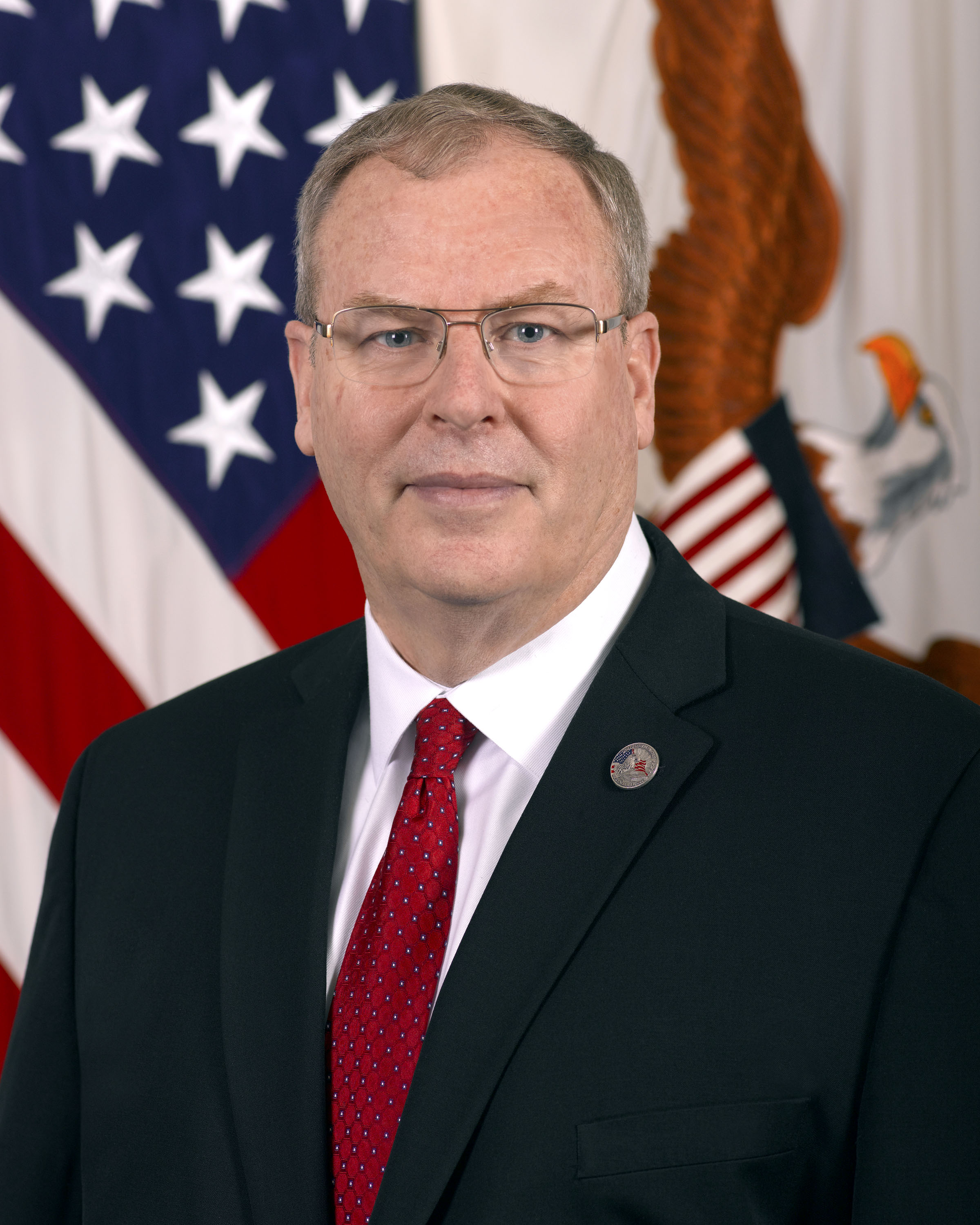
Robert O. Work
32nd United States Deputy Secretary of Defense

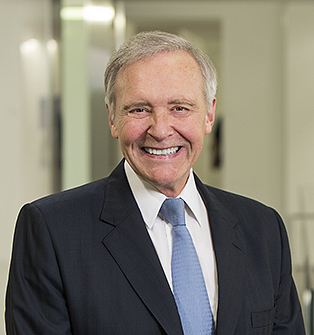
Joseph LeBaron
Former U.S. Ambassador to Qatar & Mauritania

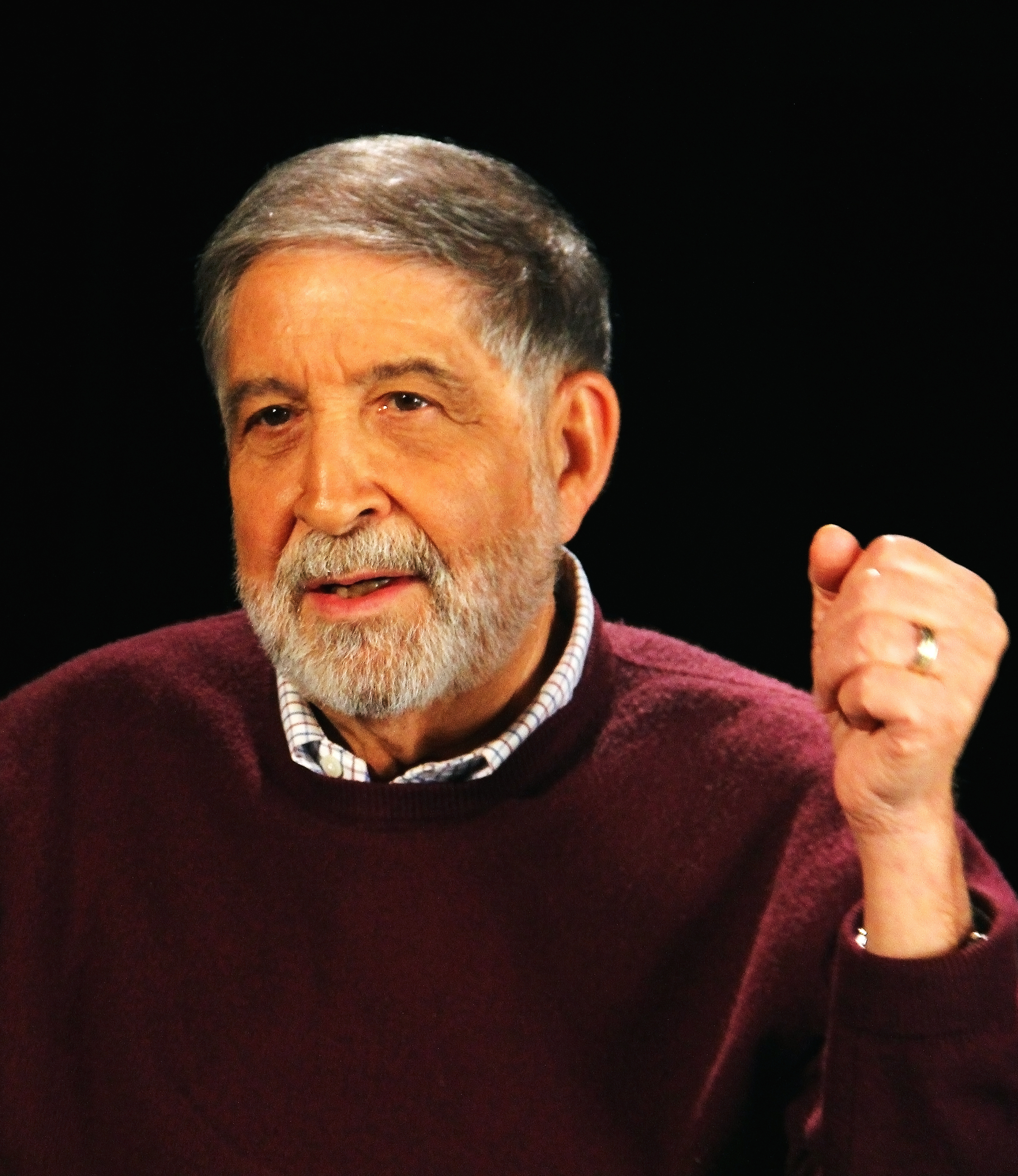
Rep. Mickey Edwards
Former Chair of the House Republican Policy Committee

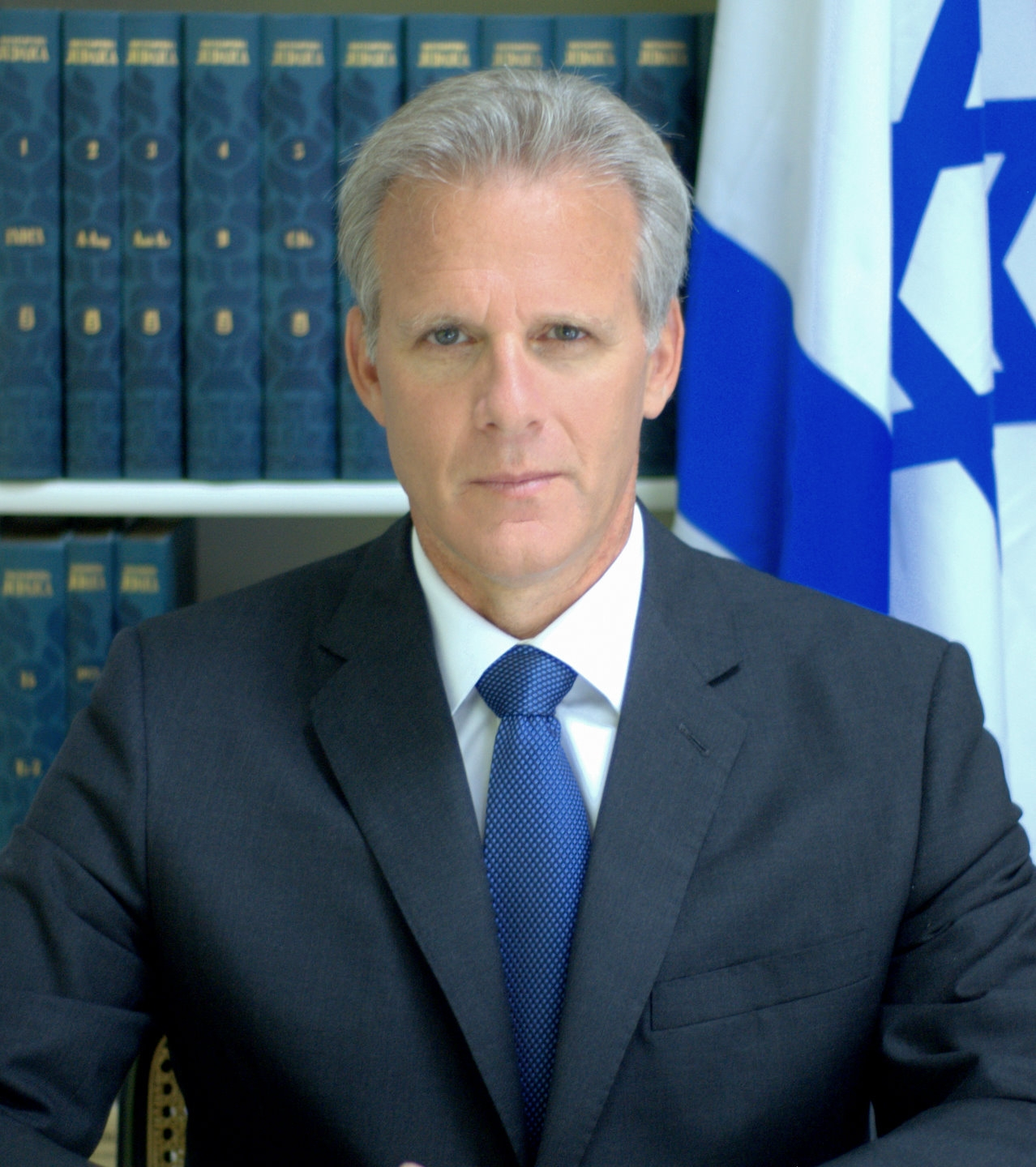
Michael Oren
Israeli Ambassador to the United States

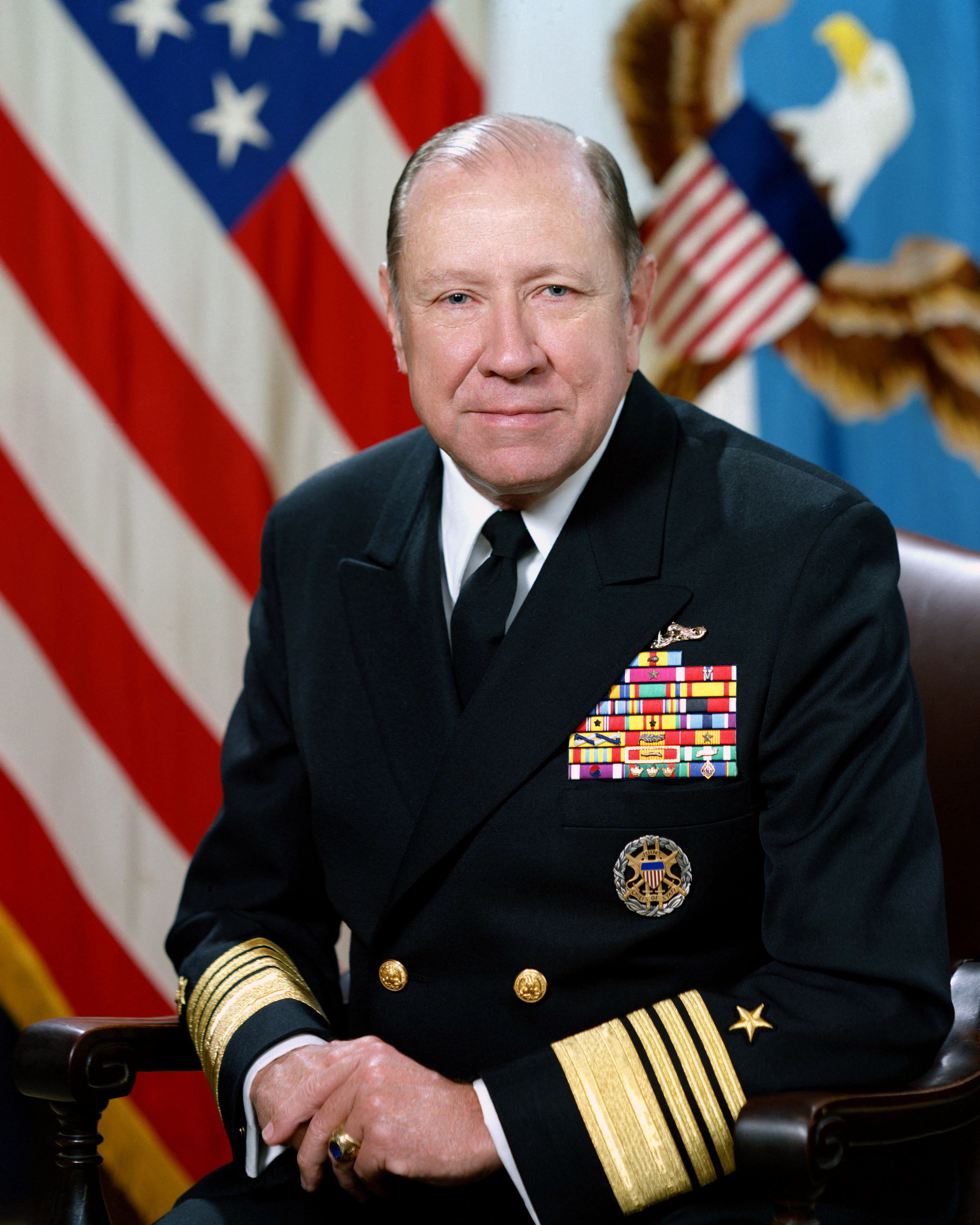
William J. Crowe
Former Chairman of the Joint Chiefs of Staff

Notable past faculty have included Moudud Ahmed (former Prime Minister of Bangladesh), William Luers (former President of the Metropolitan Museum of Art), Joseph LeBaron (U.S. Ambassador to Qatar and Mauritania), William J. Crowe (former Chairman of the Joint Chiefs of Staff), Thomas J. Dodd Jr. (former U.S. Ambassador to Costa Rica & Uruguay), Christopher A. Kojm (former Chairman of the National Intelligence Council), S. M. Krishna (former Foreign Minister of India), and Andrew A. Michta (Adjunct Fellow at the Center for Strategic and International Studies)

== See also ==
- List of George Washington University alumni
- List of George Washington University faculty
