= Musashino Gakuin University =

University in Japan

Coordinates: 35.867370°N 139.386565°E

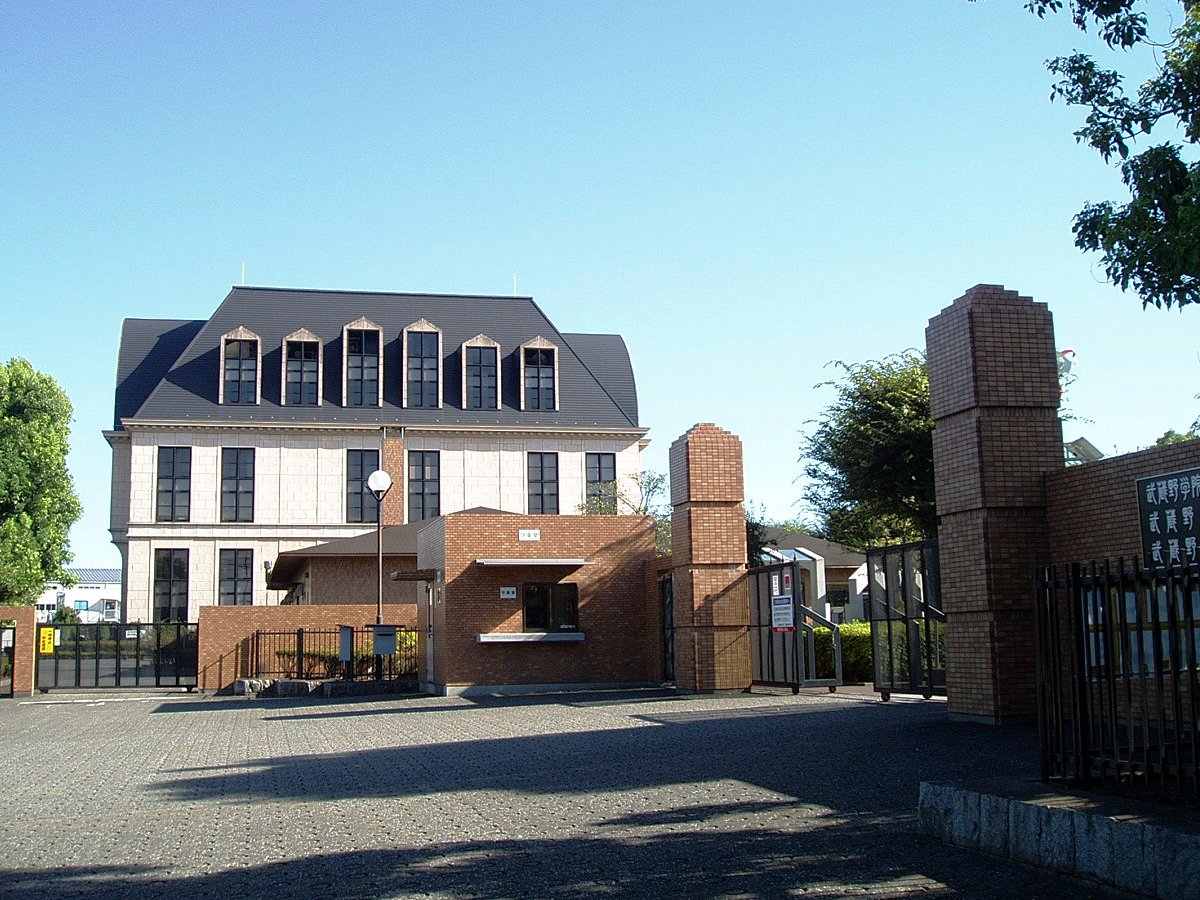
Library

Musashino Gakuin University (武蔵野学院大学, Musashino gakuin daigaku) is a private university in Sayama, Saitama, Japan, established in 2004. The school also has attached middle school (in Tokyo), high school (in Tokyo), graduate school (in Sayama), junior college (in Sayama) and kindergarten (in Sayama).

== History ==
The school was founded in 1920 as Ōhashi Kasei Gakko (大橋家政学校). In 1923, the high school and middle school divisions were established in Tokyo. The junior college division was established in Sayama in 1981, and the university division was started in 2004.

== Courses Offered ==
- Pedagogy (Junior College Program)
- Communication Study (Undergraduate, Graduate, and PhD Program)

== See also ==
- Musashino Junior College
- Nobuo Takahashi (President)
- Matsushige Ono
