= Action civics =

Form of civics education

Action civics is a modern and alternative form of civics education in the United States. Action civics is an applied civic education process in which participants learn about government by examining issues in their own community and then select a focus issue for action through a process of debate, research the issue and learn advocacy strategies, develop civic skills such as public speaking, formulate a plan, mobilize, educate, then evaluate, and reflect on their experience. Participants' voices are encouraged, valued and incorporated. Participants learn by doing, with a focus on collective action. Action civics can encompass a number of different actions from community service to electoral engagement and from talking about concerns with public officials to creating peer education campaigns.

In contrast to other more traditional forms of civic education that primarily focus on providing students with content knowledge about citizens' rights and responsibilities. This approach is often used to educate and empower young people to be active participants in their communities. There are many educational non-profit organizations that utilize action civics.

== Overview ==
In June 2010, six organizations—The Center for Information & Research on Civic Learning & Engagement, Earth Force, Generation Citizen, iEngage, Junior State of America, Mikva Challenge, and Youth On Board from Massachusetts, Illinois, Colorado, New York and California created the National Action Civics Collaborative (NACC) to share their research, evaluation methods, and to promote the concept of action civics nationally.

The Mikva Challenge, founded in 1997 by Abner Mikva and his wife now operates nationwide. The organization "raises money to encourage inner-city youths to become active in elective politics". An August 18, 2021 Chicago Sun-Times article described how Mikva Challenge youth—including seventh to twelfth graders—who had participated in a 6-week course, presented their proposals to city officials. The "Juvenile Justice Council under Mikva suggested a minimum age of 14 for detainment, in addition to alternatives to juvenile detention."

Action civics has been compared to service-learning, an educational approach in which students "enhance their sense of civic responsibility" by participating in an "organized service activity that meets identified community needs", then analyzing and reflecting on the experience. Service-learning emerged in the 1960s and 1970s, inspired by Martin Luther King and Cesar Chavez, whose philosophical roots can be traced back to John Dewey (1859–1952) and Paulo Freire. The pedagogical contributions of Lev Vygotsky and Jerome Bruner provided validity to "learning from out-of-classroom experiences".

In their 1996 publication, Building America: The Democratic Promise of Public Work, the authors raised concerns that the service-learning approach narrows the concept of citizenship by not adequately considering the potential "power and agency" relationship between "server and served". According to The Stanford Encyclopedia of Philosophy, in action civics, "participation involves "attending and participating in political meetings; organizing and running meetings, rallies, protests, fund drives; gathering signatures for bills, ballots, initiatives, recalls; serving on local elected and appointed boards; starting or participating in political clubs; deliberating with fellow citizens about social and political issues central to their lives; and pursuing careers that have public value." Other examples of action civics might include working on electoral and/or issue-based campaigns; testifying at city council or school board hearings; creating peer education campaigns (i.e. anti-bullying); serving as Student Election Judges / Poll workers; participating in debate and speech competitions; taking action on issues affecting youth in their communities; participating in mock (or real) elections; serving on boards and councils that present policy recommendations to elected and appointed officials with decision-making power; organizing and/or participating in a protest or rally in support of/against a particular issue or cause; donating directly to or running philanthropic campaigns to support a particular cause or community-based program or project; vote and/or registering voters; and/or advocating on behalf of a cause via news outlets (including social media);

== Foundational organizations that formed the National Action Civics Collaborative (NACC) ==
=== Generation Citizen ===
The nongovernmental association Generation Citizen has implemented action civics programs in public schools since 2010.

Generation Citizen (GC) partners with participating schools and provides trained college student Democratic Coaches to go into history and civics classes to teach civics. Its curriculum is ‘student-centered and action-oriented’ and has the main goal to empower youth through teaching action civics. Generation Citizen teaches action civics through their “Advocacy Hourglass.” The steps include identifying a community issue, narrowing it down to a focus issue, selecting a root cause, focusing on a goal, selecting targets, and developing tactics to solve the issue. They have financial support from the Bezos Family Foundation, The New York Community Trust, and United Airlines.

=== Earth Force ===
Earth Force is a nongovernmental organization implementing environmental action civics programs in middle schools since 1999. Today Earth Force is an educator professional development organization that specializes in preparing young people to participate in environmental decision making in their communities. Earth Force believes that citizen engagement is essential to good environmental solutions and that young people learn best by doing. Earth Force trains other organizations to incorporate environmental action civics into their programming and is currently supporting over 100 organizations in 29 states.

=== iEngage ===
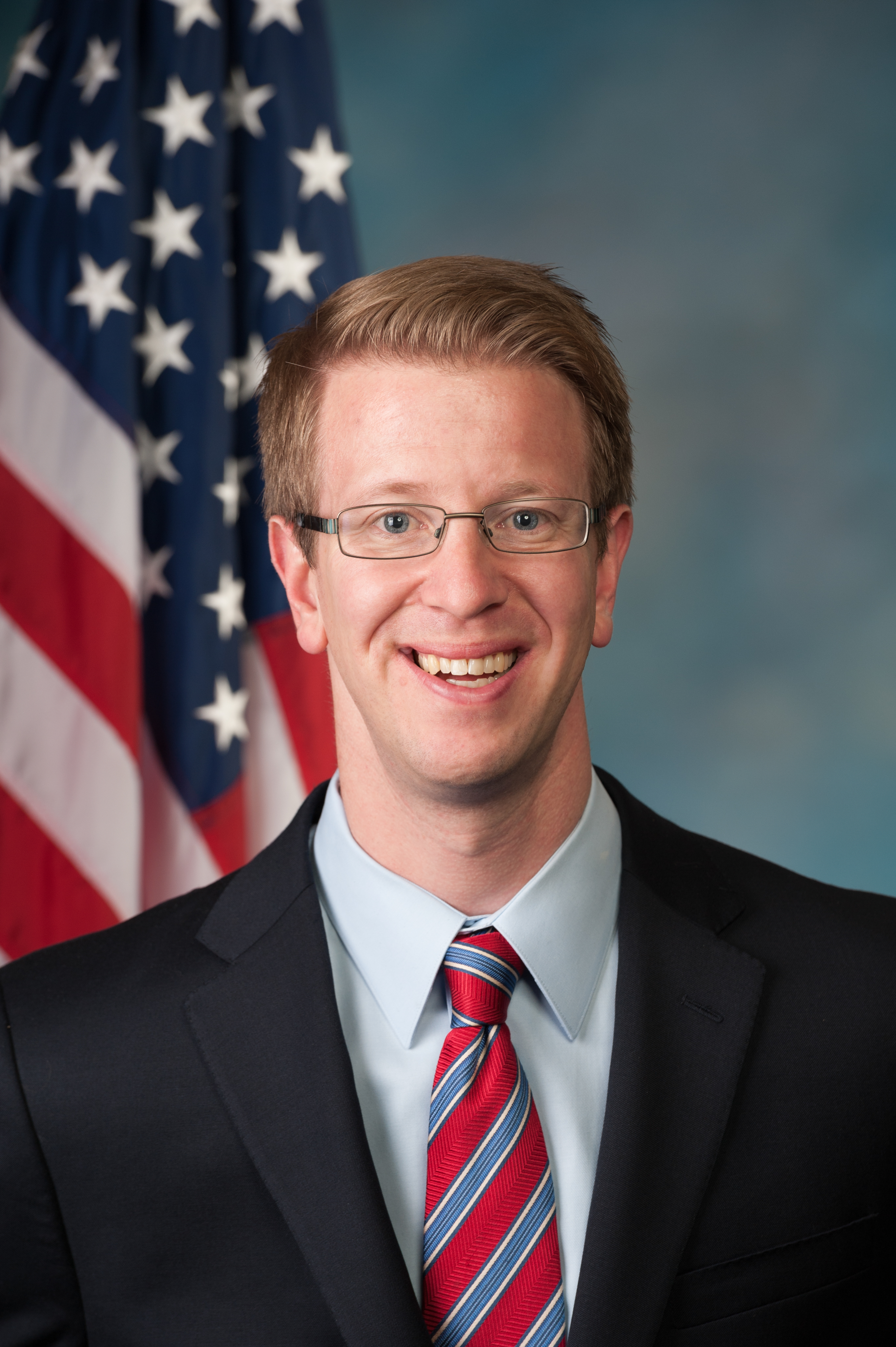
Derek Kilmer, a Congressman and alumni of the Junior State of America. His official Portrait as a member of the 113th Congress in the United States.

Established in Texas in 2013 through Baylor University, iEngage is a free, weeklong summer “civics institute” for students in grades 5-9, ages 9-14. Their mission is to develop young people’s civic and political competence while strengthening communities through inquiry-based civics programs regarding local community issues. In small groups based on grade-level, teachers help students research community issues and create a plan of action. iEngage also holds field trips to legislative libraries and hosts political guest speakers.

=== Junior State of America ===
The Junior State of America (JSA) is a Californian non-profit formed in 1934 with the goal of helping high school students develop leadership and political participation skills. Their values are "leadership, empowerment, accountability, and diversity/inclusion." JSA leads conventions and summer programs to teach students more about civics processes. The organization's notable alumni include Leon Panetta, Mike McCurry, and Tom Brady and 3 Congresspeople: Mark Takano, Derek Kilmer, and Zoe Lofgren.

=== Mikva Challenge ===
Founded in 1998, the Mikva Challenge is one of the first major action civics organizations. Also responsible for coining the term 'action civics' in 2007, the organization was founded as a tribute to Abner Mikva and his wife. Their mission is to “develop youth to be empowered, informed, and active citizen who will promote a just and equitable society.”

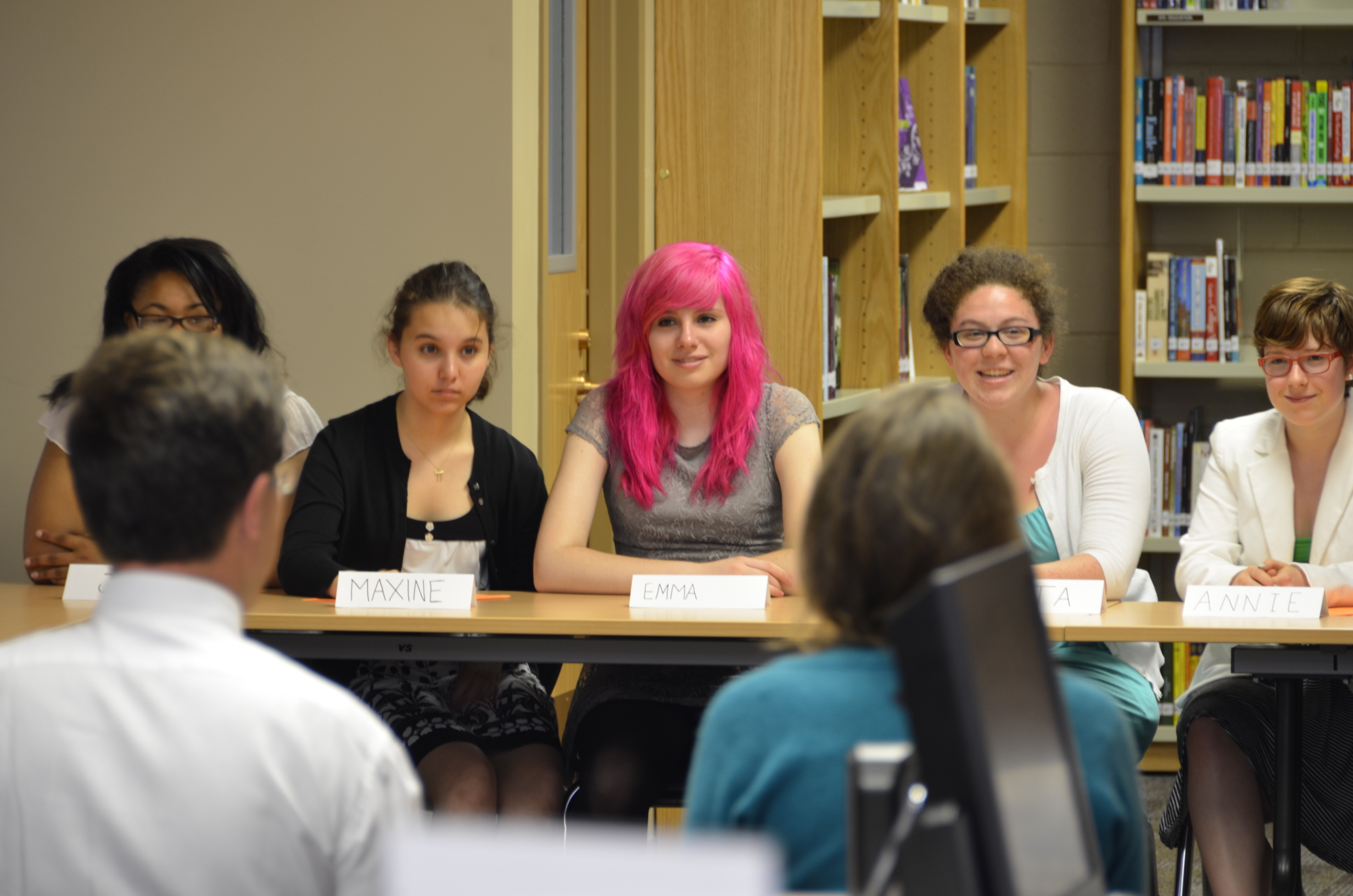
Netherlands Prime Minister Mark Rutte speaking with students participating in the Mikva Challenge in Chicago.

The Mikva Challenge operates in over a dozen state with chapters in Illinois, and Washington DC, with over 125,000 students participating each year across chapters and partnership sites.

=== Youth On Board ===
Founded in 1994, Youth on Board (YOB) facilitates youth organizing in the Boston Area. Their work follows the YOB-created “Action and Support Model” where leadership (action) and development (support) overlap to create relationships and listening. Their mission statement is to, "revolutionize the role of young people in society by: changing attitudes... supporting young people... and ensuring that policies, practices, and laws reflect young people's role as... members of their communities.”

They have established presence in 5 countries, 27 states, and 100 schools. Youth On Board has relationships with many local Boston educational organizations, such as Boston Education Justice Alliance, Boston Public Schools, and the Green Justice Coalition.

== Benefits of action civics ==
“By giving students the experience applying 21st century skills to bring about change in their own lives and communities, Action Civics helps schools fulfill both their academic and civic missions.”

Students who learn about current events in the classroom are more likely to have civic skills and be civically engaged after they graduate.

“Through this model, students do civics and behave as citizens by engaging in a cycle of research, action, and reflection about problems they care about personally while learning about deeper principles of effective civic and especially political action... These steps clearly encourage students to take ownership of a civic challenge that they care about, support their acquisition of the knowledge and skills needed to take meaningful action, expect students to take that action - to learn through citizenship and not just about citizenship - and then challenge students to reflect upon the experience as a means of consolidating their learning and empowering them to take effective action in the future.”

Extracurricular activities have been shown to encourage participants to be more politically active later in life. In particular, activities concerning community service, representation, and speaking in public forums have been shown to have the largest positive influence on future political participation.

A national study uncovered that low socio-economic status students who participate in service learning or community service have better grades, better attendance, and feel more bonded to school than their peers.

Advocates of action civics contend that this approach prepares students for college, careers, and citizenship in the 21st century.

Civic engagement in high school significantly increases college graduation odds, even when controlling for socioeconomic and demographic factors. By becoming engaged in their communities, students grow to understand the relevance of their education, which increases their academic motivation.

According to a 2011 Social Education journal article, action civics contributes to closing the civic engagement gap by teaching civic skills and increasing civic motivation through student-centered, action-oriented, community-based learning.

“[Research] suggests that opportunities carefully orchestrated yet not overly structured that invite [youth from challenging urban and educational environments] to apprentice into the world of civic and political engagement can have tremendous results. These opportunities [...] appear likely to impact the youth’s knowledge, skills, and dispositions in enduring ways. They even appear to have impacted the civic engagement of the [participating] youths’ families and the civic life of their communities in many cases.”

“The evidence does suggest that these interventions do have significant potential to reduce the civic empowerment gap by setting youth on a path to engagement that they wouldn’t have found on their own but will continue down once they’re on it... [it] seems that initial interest can be certainly be made rather than born: in other words, if young people are led or even forced to participate in guided experiential civic activities that are engaging, they may well become more civically engaged in the long run.”

A longitudinal study of close to 4,000 Chicago Public Schools (CPS) from 2003 to 2005 showed that "students who experienced a focus on topics such as social issues and community improvement in any of their classes developed a stronger commitment to civic participation."

== Advocates ==
Arne Duncan, U.S. Secretary of Education, stated "Unlike traditional civic education, civic learning and democratic engagement 2.0 is more ambitious and participatory than in the past. To paraphrase Justice O’Connor, the new generation of civic education initiatives move beyond your “grandmother’s civics” to what has been labeled “action civics.”"

Peter Levine, director of CIRCLE at Tufts University, advocates for creating "space for open-ended politics," which he argues action civics can do.

Brian Brady, President Youth Engage, coined the phrase in 2007 while at Mikva Challenge. Action Civics - A Love Story - Medium Column. Brady writes that action civics projects have demonstrated powerful impacts on students academics, social emotional learning, and college and career success.

=== Critics ===
Some scholars, such as Chester Finn of the Thomas B. Fordham Institute, argue that Action Civics aims “to turn children into activists” and inappropriately promotes a “communitarian view that issues facing society are best dealt with through group action, by people joining hands and working together rather than through the political process.” These detractors contend that civic educators should instead place emphasis on “infusing kids with basic knowledge about government, and understanding of the merits (as well as the shortcomings) of American democracy, and a sense of what can still be called patriotism: the belief that this country and its values need to be defended.”

The Heartland Institute similarly argues that Action Civics is actually “a mechanism to make students political activists for various favored adult causes” and is therefore “controversial because it uses taxpayer dollars to support a political party or partisan ideology.”

Others have argued that this type of civics negatively highlights America’s problems rather than its promise, foundations and values.

In addition, some critics argue that Action Civics prioritizes the development of civic skills to the exclusion of content knowledge - a preference that bothers those who advocate for the importance of civic knowledge such as Constitutional rights and responsibilities, government structures, and so on. A 2011 policy brief from the American Education Institute notes that many citizens are “reluctant to recommend that high schools promote civic behaviors like community service and raising money for causes, believing instead that teaching facts and concepts should take priority.”

It is also difficult to assess students’ outcomes because at this time there is no set state standards or benchmarks to measure students’ development.

Others argue that Action Civics is synonymous to service learning, which can be seen as a soft (and often, a one-shot) approach to community problem-solving and lacking in academic value when it is disconnected from the classroom experience.
