= Frank Batten School of Leadership and Public Policy =

Public policy school of the University of Virginia

Coordinates: 38.034133°N 78.505478°W

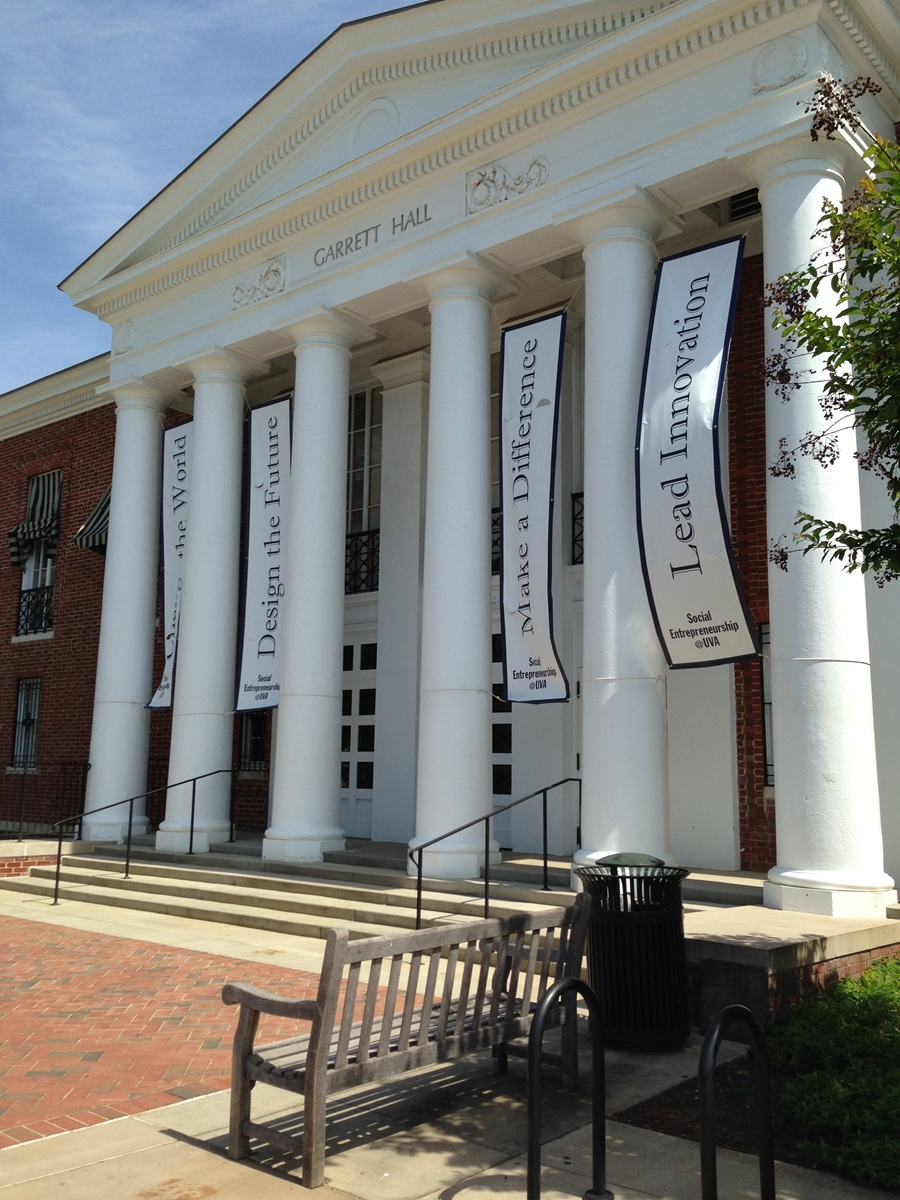
- Garrett Hall at the University of Virginia, home of the Frank Batten School of Leadership and Public Policy
- Type: Public
- Established: 2007
- Parent institution: University of Virginia
- Endowment: $130 million
- Dean: Eileen Chou
- Location: Charlottesville, Virginia, United States
- Website: www.batten.virginia.edu

The Frank Batten School of Leadership and Public Policy (also known as the Batten School) is the public policy school of the University of Virginia.

The school offers classes and degree programs in public policy and leadership. The school, established in 2007, is closely aligned with many of the university's other schools, including the architecture, business, education, engineering, law, and medicine schools, as well as with programs in politics, economics, and applied ethics.

== History ==
The Frank Batten School, located in Charlottesville, Virginia, was established in 2007 by a $100 million gift from University of Virginia alumnus Frank Batten. A part of the university's strategic plan, the Batten School was designed to be an expression of UVA's Jeffersonian heritage. Frank Batten's vision was to create an institution that "focused on developing leaders who understand the responsibilities and opportunities of public life and have a bias for action." The school is housed at the center of the university's grounds in Garrett Hall, next to Thomas Jefferson's Rotunda and the Lawn. Harry Harding, previously the dean of the George Washington University Elliott School of International Affairs, was selected as the school's founding dean in January 2009. Garrett Hall went through a multimillion-dollar renovation while under Dean Harding. The project was completed in the summer of 2011. In May 2014, the university announced that University of Michigan professor and national security and international relations policy expert Allan Stam was slated to become Batten's second dean. Stam began his term July 1 of that year. In 2019, Ian Solomon was named as the next dean of the Batten School. An alumnus of Yale Law School and former legislative counselor to then-Senator Barack Obama, Solomon has experience in local, national, and international politics; Dean Solomon lives in Pavilion X on the Lawn where he frequently hosts students, faculty, staff, and guests of the Batten School.

== Academics ==
Teaching and research is overseen by the academic affairs office, headed by Dean Ian Solomon. The assistant dean meets regularly with students. Additionally each student is assigned a faculty mentor. The Batten School operates under the University of Virginia's Honor System and enforces strict consequences for instances of lying, cheating, and stealing within the school. Batten offers multiple degrees and ways to study leadership and public policy.

=== Degrees ===
==== Master of public policy (MPP) ====
Batten's core curriculum requires master of public policy students to take classes in four main areas: 1) concepts and tools of problem solving and policy analysis, 2) leadership, 3) context of public policy, and 4) applied, experiential learning. Students also must take electives, complete an internship, and present an applied policy project—where students must conduct a professional study for an outside client. Optional one-credit short classes are also offered. MPP students often pursue summer internships at various public-sector consulting and contracting firms, as well as in federal, state, and local governments or NGO/nonprofit organizations. MPP candidates must take a minimum of twelve credits and a maximum of seventeen credits; permission from the assistant dean is required to enroll in over seventeen credits.

==== Accelerated master of public policy program ====
The accelerated bachelor/master of public policy program allows current University of Virginia undergraduates to complete both a bachelor's and a master's degree in five years (one year earlier than the six years it would take to complete these degrees separately). Eligible students apply for the program their third year at UVA and must complete three Batten courses per semester their first year at the school. The core curriculum is the same as that of the MPP program.

==== Dual-degree programs ====
The Batten School offers five dual-degree programs where students may earn a degree from another graduate school at the University of Virginia while they pursue their public policy studies.

==== Bachelor in public policy ====
The school began offering a BA degree in leadership and public policy in 2012, with a focus on global and domestic policy. To complete the degree students must complete the core curriculum required by the University of Virginia as well as an additional forty-two credit hours of Batten classes.

==== Minors at Batten ====
Undergraduate students at the University of Virginia may apply into one of two minors offered at the school: a minor in public policy and leadership or a minor in social entrepreneurship. The minor in public policy and leadership consists of eighteen credits and focuses on public policy issues and decision-making processes in public policy formulation and application. Interested students must apply into the program to attain the minor. The minor in social entrepreneurship is one of three concentrations within the entrepreneurship minor at UVA, administratively hosted within the McIntire School of Commerce.

==== BattenX ====
BattenX is a series of programs that serve as a convening place to explore new, innovative, and difficult topics in leadership and public policy. They are short-term programs targeted towards professionals already in the public policy space. Previous course topics include leadership, Congressional gridlock, procedural policing, and data impacts on policy.

=== Academic honors and awards ===
The Batten School and the University of Virginia offer two annual Outstanding Graduate Teaching Assistant awards, given at the end of the academic year. In addition to these teaching awards, Batten also awards efforts in policy analysis. The Outstanding Applied Policy Project Award is given to an MPP student annually, honorable mentions are occasionally awarded as well. Students are also eligible for the Dean's List and commencement awards.

=== Centers and collaborations ===
==== Center on Education Policy and Workforce Competitiveness ====
Founded in 2011, the center is a collaboration between the School of Education and Human Development (formerly the Curry School of Education) and Batten. The Center aims to draw scholars from the University of Virginia and from around the state to conduct research and data development on educational policy. The interdisciplinary Center also conducts a seminar series on educational policy.

==== Center for Effective Lawmaking ====
A collaboration between the University of Virginia and Vanderbilt University, the Center for Effective Lawmaking "seeks to advance the generation, communication, and use of new knowledge about the effectiveness of individual lawmakers and U.S. legislative institutions." The center evaluates lawmakers on effectiveness on four components: proven ability, advancing legislation, members' agenda items, and progression through the legislative process into law. The aim of the center is to hold Congress accountable to real results by evaluating the effectiveness with which they achieve their legislative agendas.

==== Global Policy Center ====
The Global Policy Center, established in 2015, seeks to bring together academic and policy scholarship in order to address the world's most pressing humanitarian and development challenges with the tools of research and education. It works alongside the Humanitarian Collaborative at the University of Virginia to accomplish this goal. Collectively, the two groups work to address early childhood development, migration and displacement, and humanitarian advocacy and operational effectiveness.

==== National Security Policy Center ====
The National Security Policy Center seeks to advance peace and foreign policy through evidence-based teaching, research, and policy engagement on pressing U.S. security issues. Positioned at UVA and only 100 miles from Washington, D.C., the center is equipped to access policymakers in order to gain strategic clarity that will lead to successful US foreign policy. The Center partners with the Global Infectious Disease Institute, the Cyber Innovation and Society Institute, the National Security Innovation Network, the Global Policy Center, and the National Security, Intelligence, and Defense Club.

==== Center for Social Innovation ====
The Center for Social Innovation identifies difficult social problems, designs ways to solve them through public and private sectors, and passes these solutions on to policymakers. The center is led by Directors Molly Lipscomb, Christine Mahoney, and Bevin Etienne. The center's primary focus is on research and methods testing.

=== Social entrepreneurship at UVA ===
The subject of social entrepreneurship is a fairly new development in public policy curriculum, in 2013 Batten Professor Christine Mahoney and two students received a grant from the Jefferson Trust to fund classes, competitions, field work, and faculty. Social Entrepreneurship @ UVA (SE@UVA) is a pan-university interdisciplinary program that seeks to engage students in thought about social change through entrepreneurship in non-profits, NGOs, and government institutions. With a focus on creating value for multiple parties, not just focusing on shareholders, SE @ UVA features numerous classes for both graduate and undergraduate students at Batten, including a startup class open to all students, regardless of major or School. The program also sponsors student competitions and hosts lecture series. It centers on developing student skills in interdisciplinary fields, along with finance, policymaking, nonprofits, and international development, and focuses on enacting those skills in real life ventures. SE @ UVA's projects are located in countries across the world, including Brazil, Tanzania, Rwanda, Zambia, and the Philippines. Classes are cross-listed in the Batten School, as well as in the School of Education and Human Development and the University of Virginia College of Arts and Sciences. It also works closely with the School of Engineering and Applied Science, Darden School of Business, and the McIntire School of Commerce. Its four guiding pillars are 1) cross-disciplinary curriculum, 2) experiential education, 3) research and scholarship, and 4) leadership development.

=== Labs ===
The Batten School holds a variety of labs that conduct research on topics like psychology and economics. The Behavioral Lab focuses on interpersonal dynamics and organizational behavior to better understand how people act in interdependent contexts. The Judgement and Decisions Experimental Lab looks at behavioral regulators to examine the organizational, social and psychological forces that influence the decision-making process. The Public Engagement in Governance: Looking, Listening, and Learning Laboratory seeks to engineer change by expanding policymaking conversations to include not only those who create and administer policies, but those who live them. The Social Behavior and Decision Lab investigates social judgement and self-regulation in a multitude of social contexts, including competition, reciprocity and the interplay of group and individual goal pursuit. Finally, the Social Cognition and Behavior Lab researches how social identities affect behavior, developing viable ways for individuals to cope with challenging intergroup exchanges and social diversity at large.

== Student life ==
The Batten School has its own thriving student life with a close connection to the University of Virginia and the Charlottesville community.

=== Student groups ===
Students are encouraged to join a number of organizations. Both the undergraduate and graduate programs have a council of student leaders who are elected to run community outreach, events, professional development activities, and head external, internal, and social committees. Batten Builds is a group that brings students, faculty, and staff together to support nonprofits in the Charlottesville and Albemarle County area. Previous nonprofits the group has helped include Habitat for Humanity, the Ronald McDonald House, Albemarle Housing Improvement Program, Senior Center, Inc., and others. The Foreign Policy Club introduces students to issues of foreign and domestic policy with discussion meetings, guest speakers, and speaker debates. The Women in Policy Club provides a forum for members to unpack news coverage of women through a policy lens, using their background and training in the area. The Black Student Leaders in Policy (BSLIP) provide camaraderie and professional support to Black students attending Batten, giving them a chance to get to know one another and help advance each other's skills as future Black policymakers and stakeholders. Policy Rights Inclusion Diversity Equity (PRIDE) at Batten provides LGBTQ+ Batten students a space to convene on queer policy issues, as well as providing fellowship among queer Batten students. Formative Change Group (FCG) Consulting is a pro-bono consulting group that lends the services of its members to non-profits in the area. It was launched in 2012 as a part of the Clinton Global Initiative commitment. The students apply their policy analysis skills to their clients' real world problems and provide the necessary knowledge and support to the organizations so they can carry out their core mission.

The Virginia Political Review (VPR) is an independent, student-run publication based out of the Batten School. Through opinion pieces, research, book reviews, and other works the group seeks to foster discussion around issues of public policy and promote the work of Batten graduate students. In addition to their bi-annual publication, VPR also hosts a blog, The Third Rail with more timely content.

The Batten Latinx Network (BLN) is a student organization that aims to form a community of Latinx students at the Frank Batten School of Leadership and Public Policy. Through this organization, the organization hopes to welcome/recruit prospective undergraduate and graduate Latinx students, to host professional development events for prospective and current students, and to maintain relationships with Latinx alumni.

== Notable people ==
- Malcolm Brogdon
- James Childress
- Marc Ferzan
- Harry Harding
- Frederick Hitz
- Charles A. Holt
- James D. Savage
- Sarah E. Turner
- Timothy Wilson
