= Sarah E. Turner =

American economist

- Born: July 25, 1966 (age 60)
- Education: Princeton University (BA); University of Michigan (PhD)
- Scientific career
- Fields: Economics
- Workplaces: University of Virginia
- Thesis: (1997)
- Website: economics.virginia.edu/people/set5h

Sarah E. Turner (born July 25, 1966) is an American professor of economics and education and Souder Family Endowed Chair at the University of Virginia. She also holds appointments in the university's Department of Economics, the Batten School of Leadership and Public Policy, and the School of Education and Human Development (formerly the Curry School of Education). She is a faculty research associate at the National Bureau of Economic Research and a research affiliate at the Population Studies Center at the University of Michigan.

== Education ==
Turner received her Bachelor of Arts in economics with magna cum laude (high honors) from Princeton University in 1989. She earned her doctorate in economics from the University of Michigan in Ann Arbor in December 1997. While at the University of Michigan, Turner earned the NICHD Trainee title for the National Institute of Child Health and Human Development at the Population Studies Center (1994–1997), and the Regent's Fellowship for Graduate Study (1992–1994).

== Career ==
Turner has been University Professor of Economics and Education at the University of Virginia and the Souder Family Endowed Chair since 2008 and 2014, respectively, having joined the department as an assistant professor of education and economics in 1997. She was Economics Department chair from 2013 until 2016. Turner has been on the Spencer Foundation Major Grants Program Committee (1999–2001), and she was Baccalaureate & Beyond part of the Technical Advisory Committee (2001–2003), AERA (Division L) Program Committee (2005–2006) and the APPAM Program Committee (2006). She was an editor for the Journal of Labour Economics (2012–2014), American Economic Review (2011–2017), and the Education Finance & Policy (2018-present). Turner has also held private sector jobs such as working for J.P. Morgan in New York, NY as a Research Assistant from 1989 to 1990, and for The Andrew W. Mellon Foundation in New York, NY as a Research Associate for the publication "The 'Flight from the Arts and Sciences': Trends in Degrees Conferred." from 1990 to 1992.

== Research ==
Turner is best known for her work on the economics of education in the United States. Her research specializes in the economics of educational policy, and the economics of higher education. Much of Turner's work explores how higher educational opportunities - in colleges and universities - affects the labor market, including the behavioral effects of financial aid policies, such as student aid programs, social insurances, and social welfare programs.

Some of her more recent papers include "Public Universities: The Supply Side of Building a Skilled Workforce", which investigates and analyses the correlation between the decline in state funding per student and educational and research outcomes of schools, and "The Right Way to Capture College 'Opportunity'", which suggests measurement challenges in identifying whether high educational institutions actually provide opportunities for low-income students. As of today, Turner's research has been cited in 6,966 working and published papers as she continues to analyze economics of education in the United States. She is currently collaborating with John Bound at the Russell Sage Foundation in order to examine the mobility of high-educated workers through the U.S. census data.

== Selected work ==
"A Letter and Encouragement: Does Information Increase Postsecondary Enrollment of UI Recipients?" (2018) This paper by Andrew Barr and Sarah Turner explores methods that increase enrollment in postsecondary programs. This paper suggests how the dissemination and timing of information sent to Unemployment Insurance (UI) recipients greatly impact their decision to enroll. The enrollment in postsecondary programs is necessary as it increases the chances to future employment, something that is necessary as unemployment rates rise in an undesirable amount in the United States: from 6.5 percent in 2008 to 10 percent in 2009.

Regardless of the potential for significant federal financial assistance and the low cost of returning to school for the unemployed, very few do due to its difficult navigation characteristics. The federal government's 2009 initiative called "Pell Letter", where more than 20 million individuals were sent letters, had an overall impactful effect on enrollments: it increased by 40 percent above the baseline. It suggests how an information nudge or letter intervention can affect one's decision, and in this case, for the better as more individuals choose to enroll in postsecondary institutions. This paper's findings propose how well-coordinated information intervention can be more cost-efficient than raising financial aid policies to increase postsecondary enrollment participation.

"What High-Achieving Low-Income Students Know About College Options" (2015) Turner co-authored this article with Caroline Hoxby. Turner and Hoxby propose a project called Expanding College Opportunities (ECO), which is an intervention designed to test their hypothesis on how the high-achieving low-income students were less likely to apply in postsecondary institutions that have more resource-intensive characteristics as their net prices were harder to ascertain. The ECO intervention presents guidance on how to apply in higher education, its costs, graduation rates, the institution's resources, and no-paperwork fee waivers. Rather than recommending a higher education institution, the ECO intervention gave information with the freedom of choice for the individual.

"Finishing Degrees and Finding Jobs: U.S. Higher Education and the Flow of Foreign IT Workers" (2014) As time passes, technology is improving. For this reason, it is a given that there is a rise of importance to Information Technology (IT) positions as they are slowly coming to dominate, in this case, the United States' economy. There is a tremendous increase in foreign-born in IT occupations from around 15.5 percent in 1993 to around 31.5 percent in 2010. This paper emphasizes the understanding of the role of higher education in the U.S. and immigration policies in this transformation.

"Student Loans: Do College Students Borrow Too Much - Or Not Enough?" (2012) Christopher Avery and Sarah Turner study the benefits and costs of student loans and how it is changing over time. The authors suggest that we are now in the midst of what they call an "education bubble". They illustrate how current generations are overestimating the economic value that higher education provides, and many of them would be better off saving or using the money in something else. The combination of wage decline in entry-level positions and the tuition increase have placed many students in a no-win situation, pressuring them to make a financial risky decision and apply for student loans. On the other hand, the premium of a postsecondary degree in comparison to a high school degree has nearly doubled in the last three decades. In this paper, Turner and Avery analyze a framework that takes into account student loans (not as an anecdote) as something that can be optimally invested for postsecondary benefits.

In enrolling in a college or university, it is most likely the first major capital investment that one will make. For many students, it will be the first time they encounter a formal loan. Similar to buying lottery tickets, we expect large sums of benefits. However, the gains are variable. In particular, one needs to take into account the probability of completing the degree, the field of study, and the earnings differences linked to the different levels of degrees. The observation that colleges and/or universities are good investments for students still leaves many significant unanswered research questions about a student's decision to obtain a degree/diploma and their borrowing behaviour.

== Awards ==
In 2002, Turner received the Milken Institute Award for Distinguished Economic Research.

== Selected works ==
=== Scholarly publications ===
- Hoxby, Caroline and Sarah Turner. 2019. “The Right Way to Capture College “Opportunity”: Popular Measures Can Paint the Wrong Picture of Low-Income Student Enrollment.” Education Next. Vol. 19, No. 2. DOI
- Courant, Paul and Sarah Turner. 2017. “Faculty Deployment in Research Universities.” National Bureau of Economic Research Working Paper Series No. 23025 [forthcoming in Caroline M. Hoxby and Kevin Stange, editors, Productivity in Higher Education, University of Chicago Press]. Abstract.
- Barr, Andrew and Sarah Turner. 2015. “Out of work and into school: Labor market policies and college enrollment during the Great Recession”. Journal of Public Economics, Volume 124, April 2015, Pages 63–73. Abstract.
- Bound, John and Sarah Turner. 2014. “High Skill Immigration” in Census 2010, John Logan, ed. New York: Russell Sage Foundation.
- Bound, John; Breno Braga, Joe Golden and Sarah Turner. 2013. “Pathways to Adjustment: The Case of Information Technology Workers”. American Economic Review Papers and Proceedings, 103(3): 203–07. DOI. Abstract.
- Barr, Andrew and Sarah Turner. 2013. “Expanding Enrollments and Contracting Budgets: The Effect of the Great Recession Higher Education”. The Annals: American Academy of Political and Social Science, Vol. 650 (1):168-193.
- Avery, Christopher and Sarah Turner. 2012. “Student Loans: Do College Students Borrow Too Much--Or Not Enough?” Journal of Economic Perspectives, 26(1): 165–92. DOI.
- Bound, John and Sarah Turner. 2011. “Dropouts and Diplomas: The Divergence in Collegiate Outcomes” in E. Hanushek, S. Machin, and L. Woessmann (eds.), Handbook of the Economics of Education, Vol. 4, Amsterdam: Elsevier Science. Abstract.
- Friedberg, Leora and Sarah Turner. 2010. “Labor Market Effects of Pensions and Implications for Teachers.” Education Finance and Policy. Vol. 5, No. 4: 463–491.
- Bound, John, Michael Lovenheim, and Sarah Turner. 2010. “Why Have College Completion Rates Declined: Marginal Students or Marginal College?” American Economic Journal: Applied Economics, vol. 2(3): 129-57 (July). Abstract.
- Krueger, Alan, Jesse Rothstein, and Sarah E. Turner. 2006. "Race, Income and College in 25 Years: Evaluating Justice O'Connor's Conjecture." American Law and Economics Review, 8(2): 282–311. DOI. A bstract.

=== Other publications and monographs ===
- Rouse, Cecelia and Sarah Turner. 2018. “As Harvard’s admissions face federal scrutiny, a reminder that grades aren’t everything.” Philadelphia Inquirer (October 18).
- Turner, Sarah. 2018. “College Completion: State and Federal Policies.” White Paper Series: Elevating College Completion. AEI and Third Way Joint Initiative.
- Turner, Sarah. 2017. “Education markets: Forward-looking policy options.” Hutchins Center Paper. Paper was prepared for: “From bridges to education: Best bets for public investment” at the Brookings Institution (January 9).
- Dynarski, Sue and Sarah Turner 2012 “Ignore the Debt Hype. College Is a Great Investment.” 2012. CNN Money.
- Turner, Sarah. 2008. “Measuring College Success: Evidence and Policy Challenges.” In Succeeding in College: What it Means and How to Make it Happen. New York: College Board.
- Turner, Sarah. 2006. “Improving Opportunities for Low income Students at Selective Universities: Challenges for Public and Private Universities.” In Affordability and Access in American higher Education in the 21st Century, eds. Michael Fultz and Henry Lufler. Madison: University of Wisconsin.

=== PSC reports ===
- Bound, John, Breno Braga, Gaurav Khanna, and Sarah E. Turner. 2016. "A Passage to America: University Funding and International Students." PSC Research Report No. 16-859. 3 2016. Abstract.
- Bound, John, Michael Lovenheim, and Sarah E. Turner. 2010. "Increasing Time to Baccalaureate Degree in the United States." PSC Research Report No. 10-698. 4 2010. Abstract.
- Bound, John, Sarah E. Turner, and Patrick Walsh. 2009. "Internationalization of U.S. Doctorate Education." PSC Research Report No. 09-675. 3 2009. Abstract.
- Blanchard, Emily, John Bound, and Sarah E. Turner. 2009. "Opening (and Closing) Doors: Country-Specific Shocks in U.S. Doctorate Education." PSC Research Report No. 09-674. 2 2009. Abstract.
- Bound, John, Michael Lovenheim, and Sarah E. Turner. 2007. "Understanding the Decrease in College Completion Rates and the Increased Time to the Baccalaureate Degree." PSC Research Report No. 07-626. 11 2007. Abstract.
- Bound, John, and Sarah E. Turner. 2004. "Cohort Crowding: How Resources Affect Collegiate Attainment." PSC Research Report No. 04-557. 4 2004. Abstract.
- Bound, John, and Sarah E. Turner. 2000. "Going to War and Going to College: Did World War II and the G.I. Bill Increase Educational Attainment for Returning Veterans?" PSC Research Report No. 00-453. 9 2000. Abstract.

=== Books ===
- Lovenheim, Michael and Sarah Turner. 2017. Economics of Education. MacMillan: New York City, ISBN 978-0716777045.
