= David W. Breneman =

American economist

- Born: October 24, 1940 (age 86)
- Education: University of California, Berkeley; University of Colorado, Boulder
- Occupations: Academic, economist, nonprofit administrator
- Notable work: Liberal Arts Colleges: Thriving, Surviving, or Endangered?
- Spouse: Donna Plasket

David W. Breneman (born October 24, 1940) is an American educator, economist, and the former president and CEO of The Society of the Four Arts where he presided from January 1, 2015, to September 30, 2019. The Four Arts is a nonprofit cultural organization in Palm Beach, Florida. Established in 1936, The Society of the Four Arts is dedicated to presenting notable speakers, concerts, films, educational programs, and art exhibitions to the public. Dr. Breneman oversaw the administration of more than 500 cultural programs each year, including the prestigious Esther B. O’Keeffe Speaker Series, which features leading experts in media, politics and the arts.

Prior to serving as president, Breneman was a professor at The University of Virginia, director of the Public Policy Program at the Batten School of Leadership and Public Policy, dean of the School of Education and Human Development (formerly the Curry School of Education), visiting professor at the Harvard Graduate School of Education, and president of Kalamazoo College.

He is a nationally recognized expert on issues related to the finance and economics of higher education and is the author of several books and numerous articles.

== Career ==
Breneman received his B.A. in philosophy from the University of Colorado in 1963, Magna Cum Laude, Phi Beta Kappa, Danforth Fellow, and Woodrow Wilson Fellow, and a Ph.D. in economics from the University of California, Berkeley in 1970. He taught at Amherst College before moving to Washington in 1972. He was a Senior Fellow in Economic Studies at The Brookings Institution from 1975 to 1983, specializing in the economics of higher education and public policy towards education. From 1983 to 1989, he served as president of Kalamazoo College, a liberal arts college in Michigan. He was visiting professor at the Harvard Graduate School of Education from 1990 to 1995, where he taught graduate courses on the economics and financing of higher education, on liberal arts colleges, and on the college presidency. He went on to serve as Dean of the School of Education and Human Development at The University of Virginia from 1995 to 2007. Breneman later served as University Professor and Newton and Rita Meyers Professor in Economics of Education and Public Policy at The University of Virginia, where he also held several other leadership roles. While there, he helped secure $40 million in donations to construct a new education building and a $100 million endowment gift that established the Batten School of Leadership and Public Policy, where he served as the director of the Public Policy Program.

As a visiting fellow at The Brookings Institution Breneman conducted research for a book, Liberal Arts Colleges: Thriving, Surviving, or Endangered?, which received the 1999 Award for Outstanding Service from the Council of Independent Colleges.

He received an honorary Doctor of Education degree from Worcester State College in 1999 and an honorary Doctor of Humane Letters from Kalamazoo College in 2008.

In January 2015, Breneman replaced Ervin Duggan as the president and CEO of The Society of the Four Arts in Palm Beach, Florida. The Four Arts campus along the Intracoastal Waterway is home to sculpture and botanical gardens, as well as a children's library and the King Library, which serves as the town library for Palm Beach. The organization presents notable speakers, concerts, films, educational programs, and art exhibitions to the public. He was responsible for an annual operating budget of more than $9 million and 38 full-time staff, including the Campus on the Lake, a center for continuing education, and the Philip Hulitar Sculpture Garden. He also oversaw an award-winning renovation of the historic King Library, including the re-creation of its spectacular murals.

== Selected publications ==
- Financing American Higher Education in the Era of Globalization, with William Zumeta, Patrick M. Callan, and Joni E. Finney, Cambridge Education Press, 2012
- Smart Leadership for Higher Education in Difficult Times, with Paul J. Yakobski, 2011
- Tertiary Education in Japan, with Howard Newby, Thomas Weko, Thomas Johannesson and Peter Maasen, 2009
- Earnings from Learning: The Rise of For-profit Universities, with Brian Pusser and Sarah Turner, State University of New York Press, 2006
- Alternatives to Tenure for the Next Generation of Academics, New Pathways Series, 1997
- Strategies for Promoting Excellence in a Time of Scarce Resources, with Alton L. Taylor, 1996
- Liberal Arts Colleges: Thriving, Surviving, or Endangered?, The Brookings Institution, 1994
- ASHE Reader on Finance in Higher Education, co-edited with Larry L. Leslie and Richard E. Anderson, Ginn Press, 1993
- Academic Labor Markets and Careers, with Ted L.K. Youn, The Falmer Press, 1988
- Financing Community Colleges: An Economic Perspective, with Susan C. Nelson, The Brookings Institution, 1981
- Scholarly Communication: The Report of the National Enquiry, with Herbert C. Morton, The Johns Hopkins University Press, 1979
- Public Policy and Private Higher Education, with Chester E. Finn, 1978

== Personal ==
Breneman is married to Dr. Donna Plasket, the founding director of the University of Virginia's bachelor's degree completion (BIS) program for adults. Both longtime supporters of the arts, Breneman served on the board of the Charlottesville & University Symphony Orchestra and Plasket was a member of the boards of the Ash Lawn Opera, The Oratorio Society of Virginia and the Piedmont Council for the Arts. They reside in Keswick, Virginia.

He has two children with his previous wife, Judy Dodge; Erica an M.D. living in Berkeley, CA, and Carleton, of Flagstaff, AZ.
