= Worcester State University =

Public university in Worcester, Massachusetts, US

- Former names: Massachusetts State Normal School at Worcester (1874–1932); Worcester State Teachers College (1932–1960); Worcester State College (1960–2010)
- Type: Public university
- Established: 1874; 152 years ago
- Accreditation: NECHE
- Academic affiliations: CUMU; HECCMA
- Endowment: $60.8 million (2025)
- President: Barry M. Maloney
- Provost: Lois Wims
- Faculty: 191 full-time, 260 part-time
- Students: 5,772 (2024)
- Undergraduates: 4,892 (2024)
- Postgraduates: 880 (2024)
- Location: Worcester, Massachusetts, United States; 42.267586°N 71.843760°W
- Campus: Urban
- Colors: Royal blue and Gold
- Nickname: Lancers
- Sporting affiliations: NCAA Division III; MASCAC; NEFC; LEC
- Mascot: Chandler H. Lancer
- Website: worcester.edu
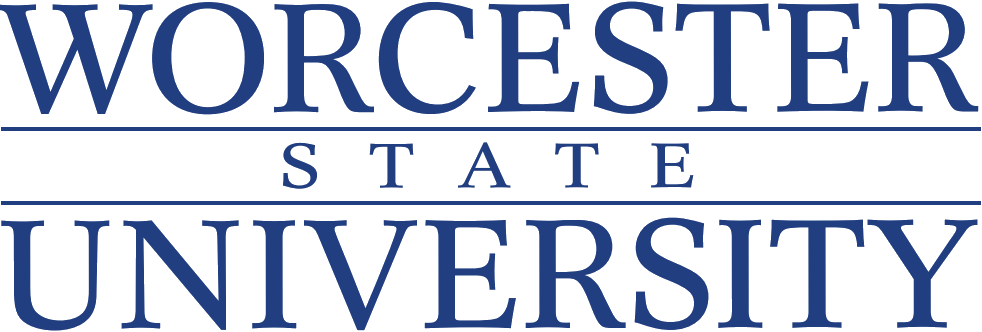

Worcester State University (WSU) is a public university in Worcester, Massachusetts, United States. The fourth largest of the Commonwealth’s nine Universities, WSU enrolls over 4800 undergraduates and nearly 900 graduate students in more than 80 undergraduate majors and minors and 32 graduate programs.

WSU was one of several Massachusetts State Universities that was founded as a normal school in the 19th century before evolving into a state college in the 1960s and achieving university status in 2012. WSU is administered by the Massachusetts Department of Higher Education which oversees 29 campuses including community colleges, state universities, and research universities across the Commonwealth.

== History ==
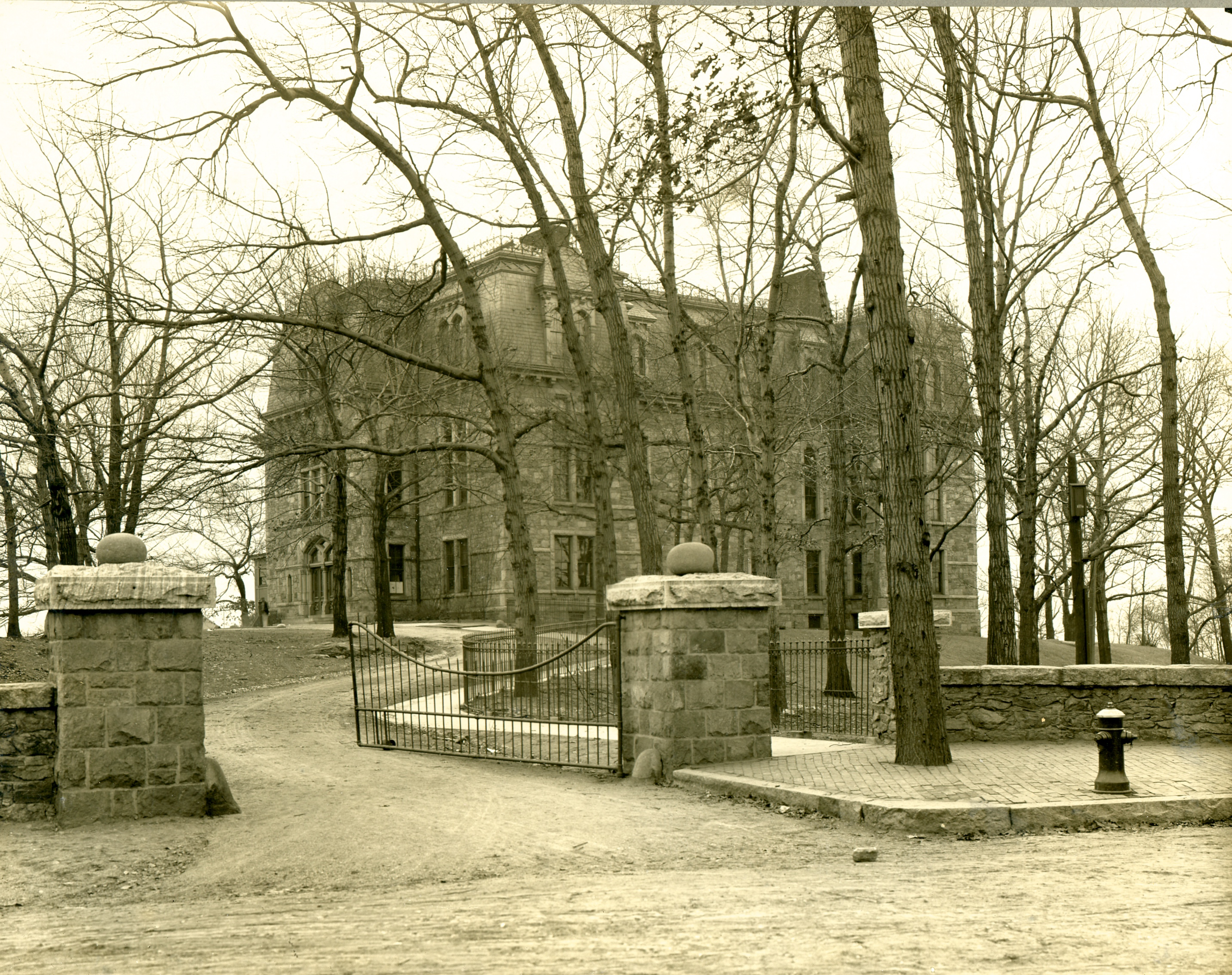
View of the original Worcester State Normal School c. 1890

Founded in 1874 as the Massachusetts State Normal School at Worcester, WSU was the fifth of nine teacher training colleges in the state. Spurred by the success of a city-run normal school founded two years earlier, its school committee successfully petitioned the Massachusetts General Court for a state-sponsored institution in Worcester. The original campus was located in a Second Empire-style stone building on St. Ann's Hill, near the city's downtown. By 1900, the campus included a president's house, the "Stoddard Terrace" residence hall, and a turreted gymnasium annex. This site would serve WSU for nearly sixty years until the current Chandler Street campus opened in 1932.

The first "principal" of WSU, Elias Harlow Russell (1874–1909), shaped the school's early curriculum. A pioneer in the Child Study Movement that emphasized childhood development and educational reform efforts, Russell partnered with colleague G. Stanley Hall, who later became President of Clark University, to develop a program that placed normal school students in city schools. Russell was later succeeded by Francis Randsom Lane (1909–1912).

In the 1920s, WSU followed national trends in teacher education by introducing a broader array of college courses and a Bachelor of Science in Education degree in 1921 culminating in a new designation of Worcester State Teachers College in 1932. The Great Depression threatened the College as the state proposed cost-cutting measures that would eliminate many schools. Presidents William B. Aspinwall (1912–1940) and Clinton E. Carpenter (1940–1946) led the college through this crisis and set the stage for post-war development under the presidency of Eugene A. Sullivan (1947–1970).

President Sullivan oversaw the expansion of the WSU curriculum. In 1952, the college introduced a Master of Science in Education, and in 1963, a Bachelor of Arts degree. In 1960 the school was designated Worcester State College. Sullivan also oversaw the development of a collegiate athletic system, introducing varsity sports in 1950 and constructing a new gymnasium building in 1958. President Robert E. Leestamper (1970–1975), further expanded graduate programs and introduced professional programs such as nursing and business. In 1973, Chandler Village was created as the first residence halls on the Chandler Street campus.

The tenure of presidents Joseph J. Orze (1975–1982) and Phillip D. Vario (1982–1992) expanded the campus with the addition of a student center and a new residence hall, named Dowden Hall, as well as continued support of varsity sports and degree offerings in speech and occupational therapy. Under the tenure of President Vario, the school joined the Coalition of Urban and Metropolitan Universities. The Worcester State Foundation was created in 1994, during the presidency of Kaylan K. Ghosh (1992–2002), to support school fundraising efforts. During the following decade, the campus grew to include the new Ghosh Science and Technology Center, as well as an additional residence hall and parking structure, which was built during the tenure of President Janelle C. Ashley (2002–2011).

In 2010, WSU reorganized into two schools: the School of Humanities and Social Sciences and the School of Education, Health, and Natural Sciences. That same year, the state granted Massachusetts State Colleges university status and the college became the Worcester State University.

In 2011, Worcester State installed its eleventh president, Barry M. Maloney. That same year, students and faculty relaunched the Worcester Spy, a newspaper originally founded in 1775.

At the end of the 2020–2021 academic year, nearby Becker College closed, and transferred custody of their academic records to WSU.

== Campus ==
WSU is located on Chandler Street in the Tatnuck neighborhood of Worcester. The 58-acre campus includes woods and wetlands, and features several buildings constructed on a steep, east-facing slope.

In the late nineteenth century, the campus was the site of "Willow Farm", home of William Sever Lincoln (1811–1889), who led the 34th Massachusetts Infantry Regiment during the American Civil War and was brevetted Brigadier General in 1865. He was the son of Levi Lincoln Jr., former Governor of Massachusetts. The property was later purchased by Worcester industrialist George I. Rockwood for whom Worcester's Rockwood Field, adjacent to WSU's campus, is named.

In 1930, the farm was acquired for WSU's new campus and, in 1942, an additional thirty-five acres were added, forming the campus's current boundaries . Today, about thirty-percent of full-time students reside on campus.

=== Buildings ===
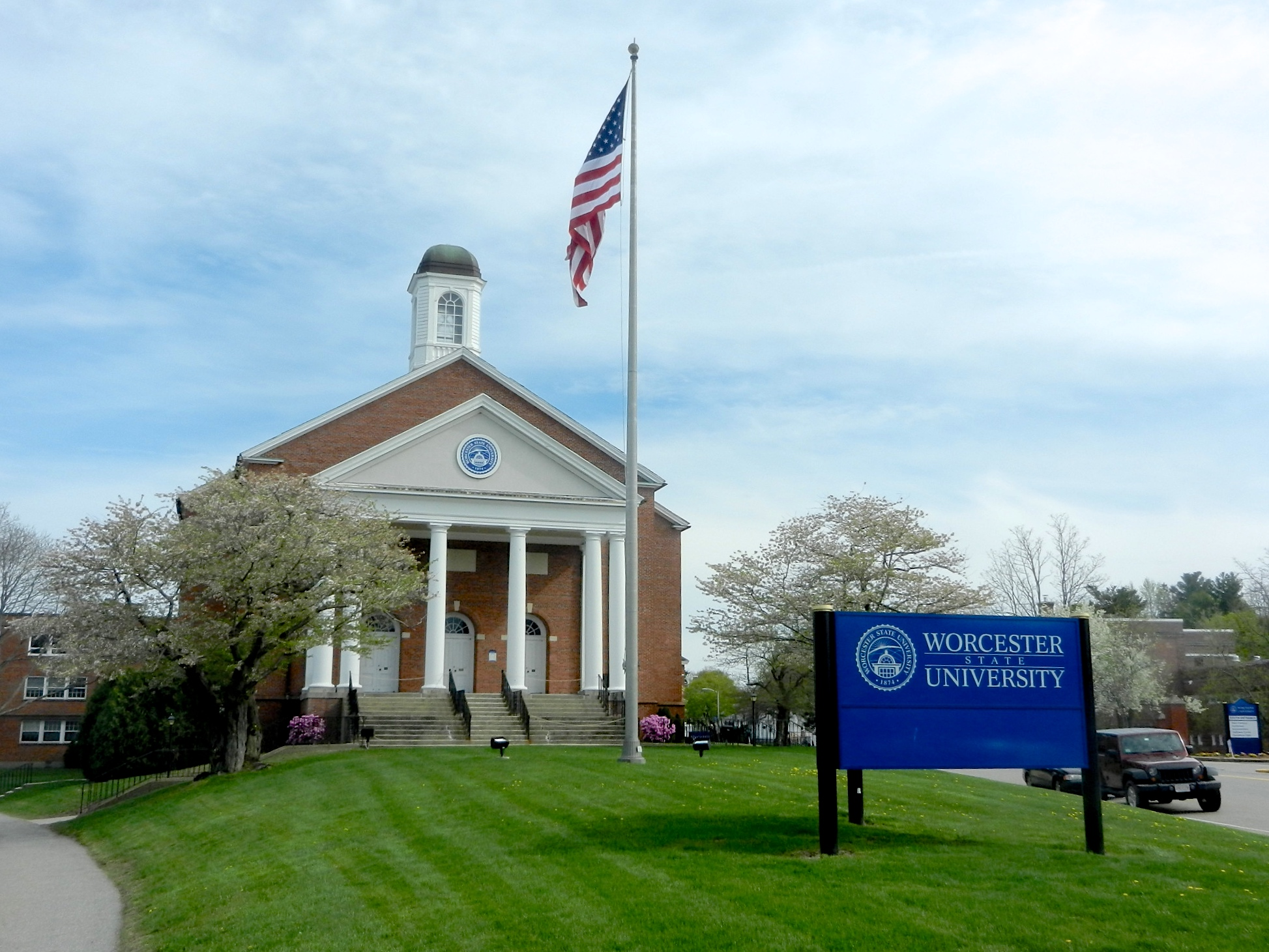
View of the May Street Building in 2018

- Ghosh Science and Technology Center (2000): The center is named after former President Ghosh and features offices, laboratories, and classrooms for Biology, Chemistry, Communication Sciences and Disorders, Computer Science, Earth, Environment, and Physics, Health Sciences, Nursing, and Occupational Therapy programs.
- Learning Resource Center (1971): The center includes the university library, along with classrooms and academic departments, namely the Communication, Criminal Justice, and Visual and Performing Arts, and Information Technology Services and Multicultural Affairs offices. The building also includes campus mail services. In 2010 building was re-clad in its distinctive metallic siding during renovations.
- May Street Building (1949): Built as the home of Temple Emanuel Sinai, WSU purchased the multipurpose building in 2015 to house classrooms, auditoriums, the Department of Sociology, and offices for the Center for Business and Industry.
- Sagamore Studios: The studios hold visual arts classes within the Worcester Center for Crafts, located at 25 Sagamore Road.
- Shaughnessy Administration Building (1932): Named for Helen G. Shaughnessy ('43) who served as a long-time educator and administrator, the building houses administrative offices including the offices of the President and the Provost, and offices for Admissions, Alumni, Development, Financial Aid, Graduate and Continuing Education, Marketing, and the Registrar. The building includes the Fuller Theater, a 166-seat venue created within the original campus auditorium.
- Student Center (1978): The center includes student organization offices, meeting spaces, lounges, and dining areas. Included are offices for Career Services, Commuter Services, International Programs, Military Affairs and Veterans Services, and Student Involvement and Leadership Development.
- Sullivan Academic Center (1966): The center houses classrooms and offices for multiple academic departments. Included are Business and Economics, Education, English, History and Political Science, Mathematics, philosophy, Psychology, Sociology, and Urban Studies. The center also includes the Sullivan and Eager Auditoriums. Originally the science building, the facility was renamed the Dr. Eugene A. Sullivan Building in 1980 in honor of the fifth university president.
- Wellness Center (2016): The newest campus building, the center features multipurpose gymnasiums, exercise areas and classrooms. Included are offices for the Department of Athletics

=== Residence halls ===
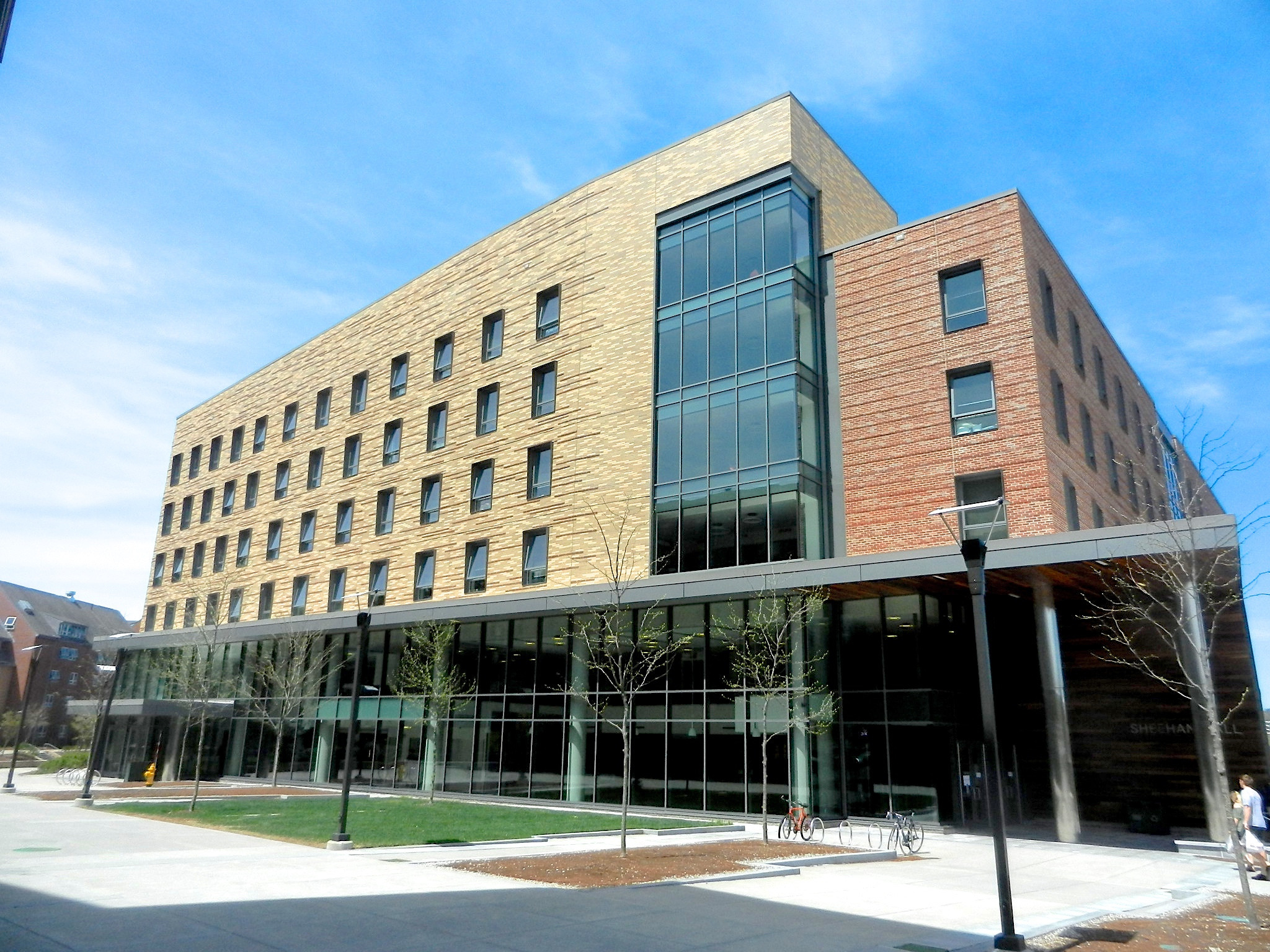
View of Sheehan Hall in 2018

- Chandler Village (1973): The village is an apartment-style complex that accommodates 420 students. It was the first student housing built on the Chandler Street campus.
- Dowden Hall (1990): Named after Vera M. Dowden, a former education faculty member, the building was expanded in 2010 to include space for 177 students.
- Sheehan Hall (2014): Named in honor of James F. Sheehan ('55), a Marine Corps Lieutenant Colonel, the hall houses 400 students. It also houses the main campus dining hall, as well as Health Services, the Office of Residence Life and Housing, and recreational facilities.
- Wasylean Hall (2004): Named after Phillip M. Wasylean II ('63), the hall accommodates 350 students. The university police station is located on the ground floor. In 2005, the building received an Honor Award for Design Excellence from the American Institute of Architects of Central Massachusetts.

== Athletics ==
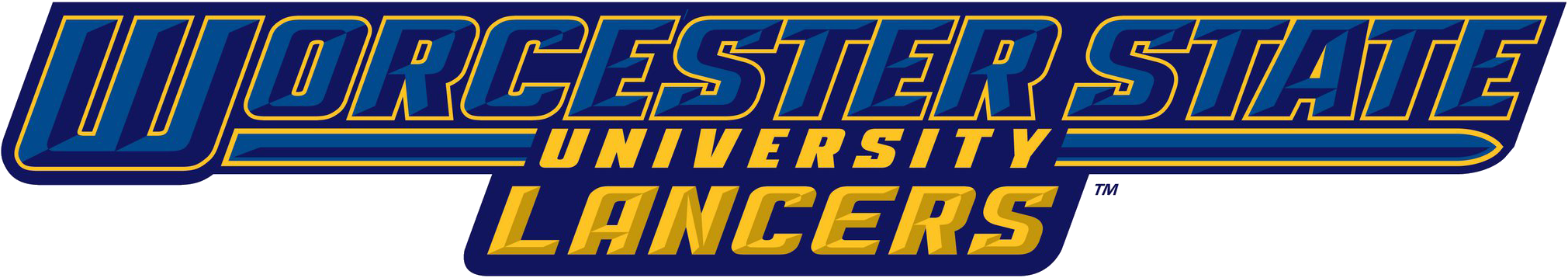
Worcester State Lancers wordmark

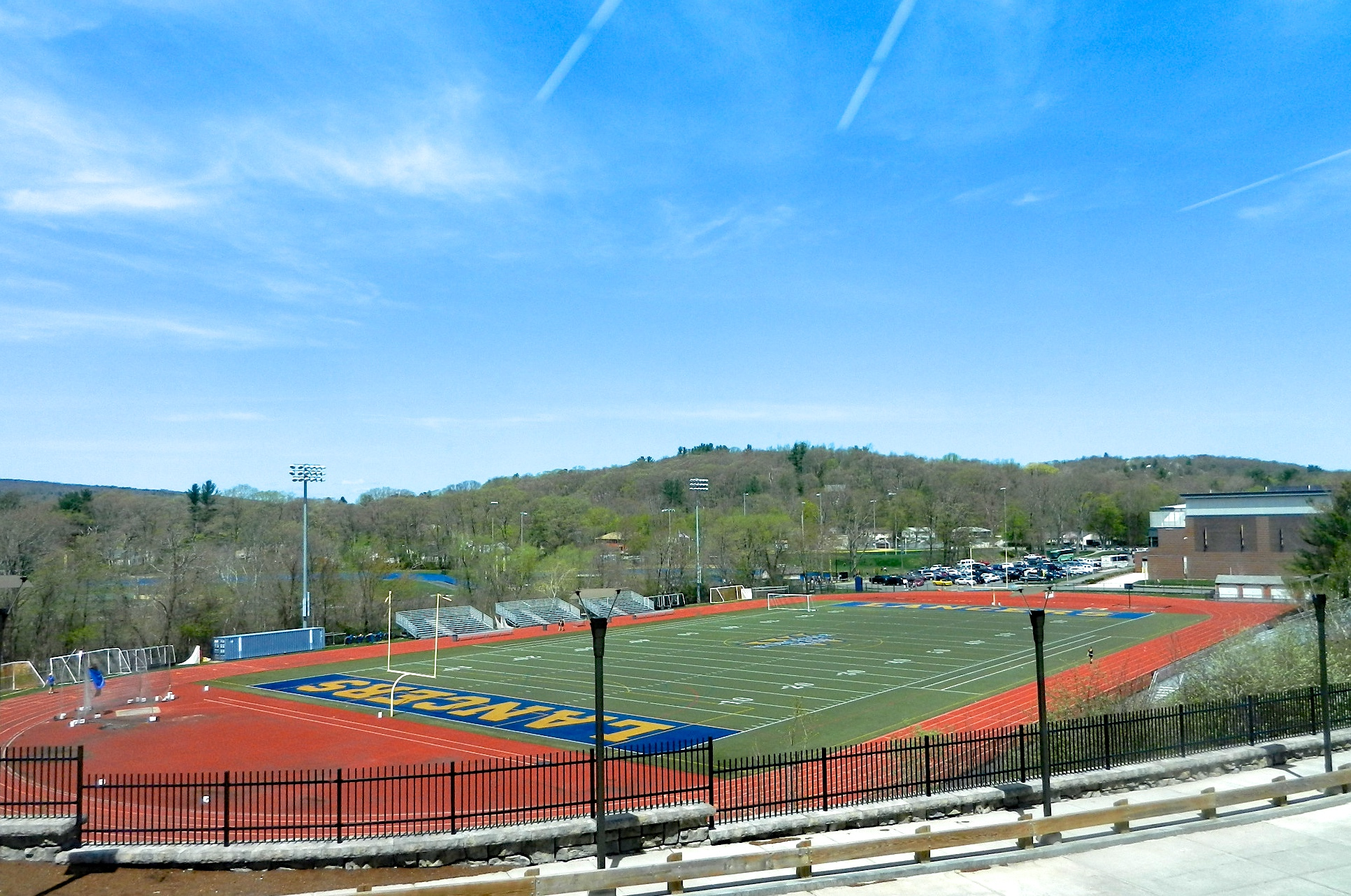
View of Coughlin Field in 2018

Worcester State athletics teams are nicknamed the Lancers. The university is a Division III member of the National Collegiate Athletic Association (NCAA) in the Massachusetts State Collegiate Athletic Conference (MASCAC), of which it is a charter member.

The field hockey and women's tennis teams also used to compete within the Little East Conference (LEC), before field hockey was incorporated as a sponsored sport by the MASCAC. Worcester State claimed the first MASCAC field hockey title in 2023. Formerly, the men's football team played in the Commonwealth Coast Football (CCC) between 1985 and 2013.

Their main venue is the John F. Coughlin Memorial Field, a two-thousand seat capacity venue that is located on Chandler Street. Teams also use the Wellness Center, Rockwood Park, and the Worcester Ice Center for games. Coughlin Field was the home soccer field of the Worcester Kings of the Premier Development League for their only two seasons before dissolving.

In 2016, WSU unveiled a new mascot, named Chandler H. Lancer, at the Worcester Art Museum.

== Rankings ==
Undergraduate demographics as of fall 2023
Race and ethnicity	Total
White	61%
Hispanic	18%
Black	9%
Asian	6%
Two or more races	3%
International student	2%
Unknown	2%
Economic diversity
Low-income (Note: The percentage of students who received an income-based federal Pell grant intended for low-income students.)	32%
Affluent (Note: The percentage of students who are a part of the American middle class at the bare minimum.)	68%

In 2024, Worcester State University was ranked 96th out of 181 "Regional Universities" in the North by U.S. News & World Report, and 450th in the nation by Forbes.

== Notable faculty ==
- Gerard T. Indelicato (dean)
- Jacob Hen-Tov (history)
- Julie E. Wollman (academic affairs)

== Notable alumni ==
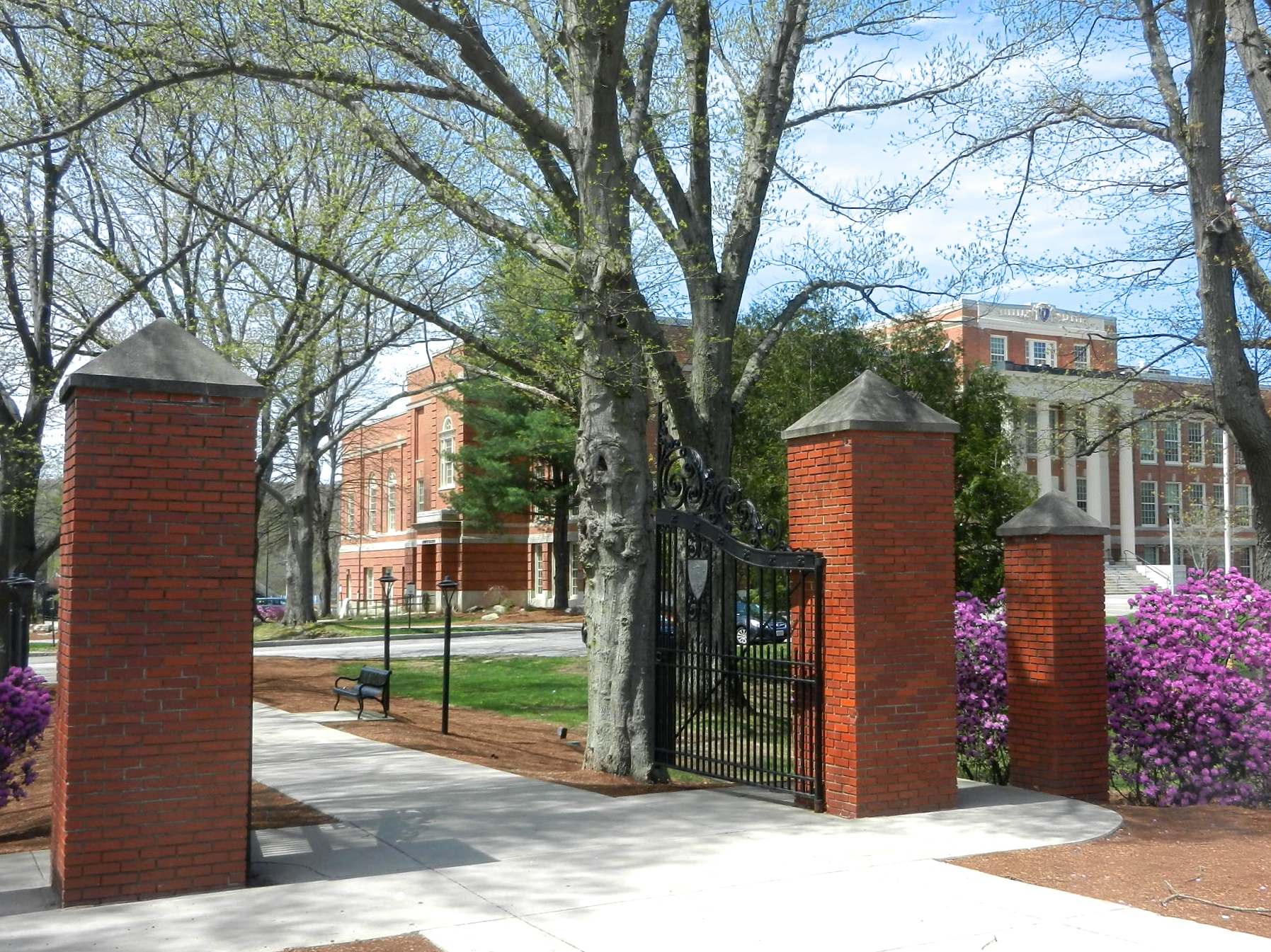
View of Alumni Gates in 2018

- Bill Adamaitis (1951), professional football player
- Agnes Ballard (1905), architect
- John Binienda (1970), member of the Massachusetts House of Representatives
- Tyler Boudreau (1997), United States Marine Corps veteran
- David W. Breneman (honorary), educator and economist
- Mario J. Bruno (2000), regional chief executive officer of the American Red Cross
- Kevin Campbell (1973), United States Army veteran
- Mark Carron, member of the Massachusetts House of Representatives
- Richard P. Cipro (1992), US Army brigadier general
- Brien Cullen (1977), football coach for Worcester State Lancers
- John Dufresne (1970), professor at the Florida International University
- Mary Fell (1969), poet
- Kimberly Ferguson, member of the Massachusetts House of Representatives
- Daniel Garvey (1973), president emeritus of Prescott College
- Bob Haas, professional football player
- Jimmy Kang (2006), music entrepreneur
- Paul King, National Football League referee
- Todd Leach (1983), chancellor of the University System of New Hampshire
- Raymond Mariano (1973), former mayor of Worcester
- Mary McNally (1978), member of the Montana Senate
- Joe Morrone (1963), soccer coach for the University of Connecticut Huskies
- David Muradian (2005), member of the Massachusetts House of Representatives
- Don Nardo (1974), historian and writer
- DJ Obi, disc jockey
- Jim O'Day (1983), member of the Massachusetts House of Representatives
- Steve Palermo (1971), Major League Baseball umpire
- Lorine Pruette, feminist
- Tony Reno (1997), football coach for the Yale Bulldogs
- Brian Skerry (1985), photographer
- Aron Stevens, World Wrestling Entertainment wrestler, billed as "Damien Sandow"
- Sarah Ella Wilson (1894), educator
- Geoffrey Zakarian (1981), chef

== See also ==
- List of college athletic programs in Massachusetts
- List of colleges and universities in Massachusetts
- List of NCAA Division III institutions
