= Mary Fell =

American poet and academic (1947–2026)

- Born: September 22, 1947; Worcester, Massachusetts, U.S.
- Died: October 18, 2026 (aged 79)
- Education: Worcester State College
- Occupations: Poet, academic

Mary Fell (September 22, 1947 – October 18, 2026) was an American poet and academic.

== Life and career ==
Fell graduated from Worcester State College majoring in English and it was here that she first became interested in poetry. Fell and fellow poet Fran Quinn toured local schools teaching poetry, starting in 1975. She earned her MFA in 1981 and received the Indiana University Award for Distinguished Teaching in 2001. She was Professor Emerita of English at Indiana University East in Richmond, Indiana and continued her writing.

Mary Fell died on October 18, 2026, at the age of 79.

== Awards ==
- 1983 National Poetry Series, for The Persistence of Memory

== Work ==
- Fell, Mary (1983). The Persistence of Memory. Random House. ISBN 978-0-394-72363-1.
- The Triangle fire: a poem. Shadow Press, U.S.A. 1983. ISBN 978-0-937724-02-6. (chapbook)
