= Bob Haas (American football) =

American football player (1906–1979)

Profile
- Position: Back

Personal information
- Born: May 25, 1906; Springfield, Ohio, U.S.
- Died: September 1979 (aged 73); Huntsville, Ohio, U.S.

Career information
- High school: Fairmont (OH)
- College: Worcester State

Career history
- Dayton Triangles (1929)

Career statistics
- Games: 5
- Stats at Pro Football Reference

Robert K. Haas (May 25, 1906 – September 1979) was an American football player. He played college football at Worcester State and professional football in the National Football League (NFL) as a back for the Dayton Triangles. He appeared in five NFL games, three as a starter, during the 1929 season.
