= Mario J. Bruno =

CEO of the Connecticut & Rhode Island American Red Cross

Division Chief Operating Officer of the American Red Cross (North Central and Northeast Divisions)

Personal details
- Born: Spain
- Spouse: Greta
- Children: 2 daughters
- Education: Worcester State University; University of Phoenix
- Occupation: Corporate executive; non-profit executive

Mario J. Bruno is a Spanish-born American business executive. Bruno is currently the chief operating officer of the American Red Cross for the divisions of North Central and Northeast.

== Career ==
A native of Spain, Bruno moved to the United States in 1990 as an exchange student. After living in Gloucester, Massachusetts, for two years, he returned to his country of origin, but soon returned to the United States in 1996.

In 1997, Bruno joined the American Red Cross as a volunteer for disaster and blood services, and as well as a cardiopulmonary resuscitation (CPR) and first aid instructor. He was promoted to the role of Disaster Chairman for the Central Massachusetts Chapter in Worcester, Massachusetts. Bruno joined the Red Cross in Connecticut in 2001 as the Senior Director of Emergency Services. A decade later, he became chief executive officer for the regions of Connecticut and Rhode Island. In 2023, Mario was promoted to Division Chief Operating Officer for the North Central and Northeast Divisions, supporting Red Cross operations in 18 states from The Dakotas to Maine.

In 2013, Bruno was named to the Hartford Business Journal's "40 Under 40" list.

== Personal life ==
Bruno earned a Bachelor of Science in biology and chemistry from Worcester State University in 2000, and a Master in Business Administration from the University of Phoenix in 2006.

Bruno is married to his wife, Greta, with whom he has two daughters: Isabella and Karina. The family lives in Guilford, Connecticut.
