= Chester E. Finn Jr. =

American policy analyst and academic (born 1944)

- Born: Chester Evans Finn Jr. August 3, 1944 (age 82); Columbus, Ohio, U.S.
- Education: Harvard University
- Board member of: • National Council on Teacher Quality • Thomas B. Fordham Foundation • CVPath Institute • National Assessment Governing Board † • Maryland State Board of Education (2015-2018) † including two years as its chairman (1988–1996)
- Spouse: Renu Virmani (m. 1974)
- Children: 2

Chester Evans "Checker" Finn Jr. (born August 3, 1944) is a former professor of education, an educational policy analyst, and a former United States Assistant Secretary of Education. He is currently the president emeritus of the nonprofit Thomas B. Fordham Foundation in Washington, D.C. He is also Volker Senior Fellow at Stanford University's Hoover Institution where he chairs the Working Group on Good American Citizenship. He was also a member of the Maryland Kirwan Commission on Education during its authorization period from 2016 to 2019.

Finn was Professor of Education and Public Policy at Vanderbilt University (1981–2002). He served as Assistant Secretary for Research and Improvement at the U.S. Department of Education (1985–88). Prior positions included Staff Assistant to U.S. President Richard Nixon; special assistant to Massachusetts Governor Francis Sargent (1972–73); counsel to U.S. Ambassador to India Daniel Patrick Moynihan (1973–74); Research Associate at the Brookings Institution (1974–77); and legislative director for U.S. Senator Daniel Patrick Moynihan (1977–81).

== Published works include ==
- Finn, Jr., Chester E., Assessing the Nation's Report Card: Challenges and Choices for NAEP (2022); Harvard Education Press
- Finn, Jr., Chester E.; Scanlan, Andrew E.; Learning in the Fast Lane: The Past, Present and Future of Advanced Placement (2019); Princeton University Press
- How to Educate an American: The Conservative Vision for Tomorrow's Schools; Michael J. Petrilli and Chester E. Finn Jr., eds. (2020). West Conshohocken, PA: Templeton Press. ISBN 978-1-59947-569-1.
- Finn Jr., Chester E.; Louann A. Bierlein; Bruno V. Manno (1997). Charter school accountability: findings and prospects. Bloomington, Indiana: Phi Delta Kappa Educational Foundation. ISBN 0-87367-625-4. LCCN 97069151.
- Finn Jr., Chester E.; Diane Ravitch; Robert T. Fancher, eds. (1984). Against mediocrity: the humanities in America's high schools. foreword by William Bennett. New York: Holmes & Meier. ISBN 0-8419-0944-X.
- Finn Jr., Chester E.; Diane Ravitch; P. Holley Roberts, eds. (1985). Challenges to the humanities. epilogue by William J. Bennett. New York: Holmes and Meier. ISBN 0-8419-1018-9.
- Finn Jr., Chester E.; Theodor Rebarber, eds. (1992). Education reform in the '90s. New York: Macmillan Pub. Co. ISBN 0-02-897095-0.
- Hess, Frederick M.; Chester E. Finn Jr., eds. (2004). Leaving no child behind?: options for kids in failing schools (1st ed.). New York: Palgrave Macmillan. ISBN 1-4039-6588-9.
- Abshire, David M. (1995). Lamar Alexander; Chester E. Finn Jr. (eds.). The new promise of American life. Indianapolis: Hudson Institute. ISBN 1-55813-053-5. LCCN 96206261.
- Hess, Frederick M.; Chester E. Finn Jr., eds. (2007). No remedy left behind: lessons from a half-decade of NCLB. Washington, D.C.: AEI Press. ISBN 978-0-8447-4255-7.
- Berdahl, Robert O. (1978). David W. Breneman; Chester E. Finn Jr. (eds.). Public policy and private higher education. Susan C. Nelson. Washington: Brookings Institution. ISBN 0-8157-1066-6.
- Finn Jr., Chester E. (1977). Education and the Presidency. foreword by Daniel P. Moynihan. Lexington, Massachusetts: Lexington Books. ISBN 0-669-00365-4. LCCN 75032871.
- Finn Jr., Chester E. (2009). Reroute the preschool juggernaut. Stanford, California: Education Next Books. ISBN 978-0-8179-4992-1. LCCN 2009015883.
- Finn Jr., Chester E. (1978). Scholars, dollars, and bureaucrats. Washington, DC: Brookings Institution. ISBN 0-8157-2828-X.
- Finn Jr., Chester E. (2008). Troublemaker: a personal history of school reform since Sputnik. Princeton, New Jersey: Princeton University Press. LCCN 2007038263.
- Ravitch, Diane; Chester E. Finn Jr. (1987). What do our 17-year-olds know?: a report on the first national assessment of history and literature. foreword by Lynne V. Cheney. New York: Harper & Row. ISBN 0-06-015849-2.
- Vanourek, Gregg; Scott W. Hamilton; Chester E. Finn Jr. (1996). Is there life after big government?: the potential of civil society. Indianapolis: Hudson Institute. LCCN 98103401.
- We Must Take Charge!: Our Schools and Our Future (1991)
- The Educated Child: A Parents Guide From Preschool Through Eighth Grade (1999; with William Bennett and John T. E. Cribb Jr.)
- Charter Schools in Action: Renewing Public Education (2001; with Bruno V. Manno and Gregg Vanourek)
- Leaving No Child Behind?: Options for Kids in Failing Schools (2004) (with Frederick M. Hess)
- Troublemaker: A Personal History of School Reform Since Sputnik (2008)
