= Michael E. Brown (political scientist) =

American academic (born 1959)

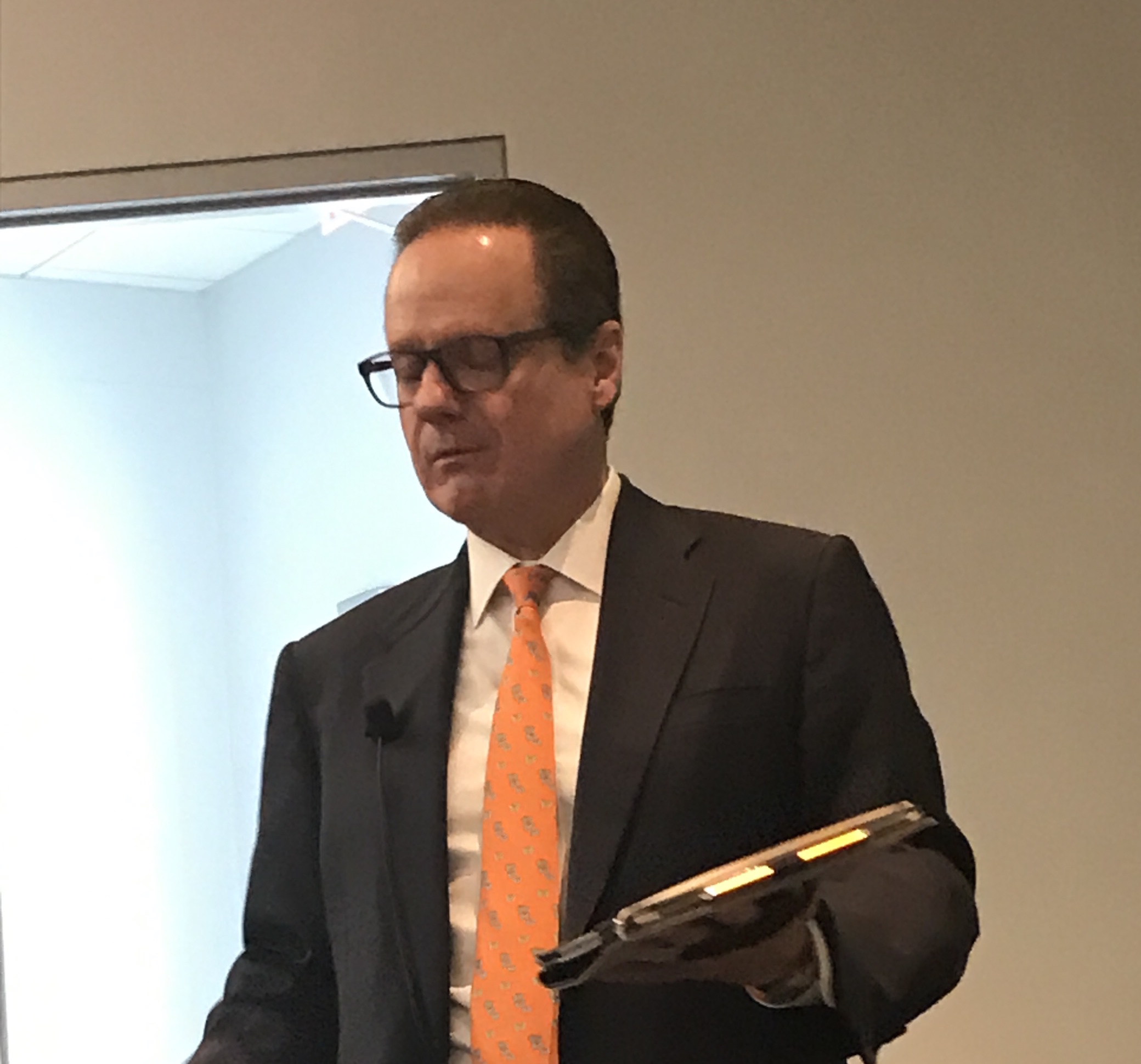

Dean of the Elliott School of International Affairs
- In office 30 June 2005 – 1 October 2015
- Preceded by: Harry Harding
- Succeeded by: Reuben E. Brigety II

Personal details
- Born: Michael E. Brown; 29 October 1959 (age 66)
- Spouse: Dr. Chantal de Jonge Oudraat
- Education: University of Pennsylvania (BA, MA); Cornell University (MA, PhD)

Michael E. Brown (born 29 October 1959) is an American academic. He formerly served as Dean of the Elliott School of International Affairs of the George Washington University, where he currently serves as Professor of International Affairs, Political Science, and Gender Studies.

== Career ==
Brown received a Ph.D. in Government from Cornell University.

He was Senior Fellow in U.S. Security Policy at the International Institute for Strategic Studies in London (1988 to 1994). He then became Associate Director of the International Security Program at the Belfer Center for Science and International Affairs at Harvard University (1994–1998). In 1998 he joined the faculty of the Edmund A. Walsh School of Foreign Service at Georgetown University, becoming Director of Georgetown's Center for Peace and Security Studies in 2000.

In 2005, he was appointed Dean of the Elliott School of International Affairs and Professor of International Affairs and Political Science at the George Washington University. He held that position until 2015, after which he continued at the school, as a faculty member with a research focus on international security.

He is well-known at the George Washington University for wearing his signature orange necktie while giving lectures, except the week of Halloween.

== Published works ==
He is the author of several books:

- Flying Blind: The Politics of the U.S. Strategic Bomber Program, Ithaca: Cornell University Press, 1992. ISBN 9780801422850. Winner of the Edgar Furniss National Security Book Award.

He is also the editor or co-editor of :

- Do Democracies Win Their Wars? Cambridge, Massachusetts: MIT Press, 2011. ISBN 9780262515900
- Going Nuclear: Nuclear Proliferation and International Security in the 21st Century. Cambridge: MIT Press, 2010. ISBN 9780262524667
- Primacy and Its Discontents: American Power and International Stability. Cambridge, Massachusetts: MIT Press, 2008.
- Offense, Defense, and War. Cambridge, Massachusetts: MIT Press, 2004.
- New Global Dangers: Changing Dimensions of International Security. Cambridge, Massachusetts: MIT Press, 2004
- Rational Choice and Security Studies: Stephen Walt and His Critics. Cambridge, Massachusetts: MIT Press, 2000.
- America's Strategic Choices. Cambridge, Massachusetts: MIT Press, 2000.
- The Rise of China. Cambridge, Massachusetts: MIT, 2000.
- The Costs of Conflict: Prevention and Cure in the Global Arena. Lanham, Md: Rowman & Littlefield Publishers, 1999.
- East Asian Security. Cambridge, Massachusetts: MIT Press, 1998.
- Nationalism and Ethnic Conflict. Cambridge, Massachusetts: MIT Press, 1997.
- Debating the Democratic Peace. Cambridge, Massachusetts: MIT Press, 1996.
- The International Dimensions of Internal Conflict. Cambridge, Massachusetts: MIT Press, 1996.
