= Harry Harding (political scientist) =

American political scientist

Dean of the Elliott School of International Affairs
- In office 5 January 1995 – 30 June 2005
- Preceded by: Maurice East
- Succeeded by: Michael E. Brown

Personal details
- Born: 1946 (age 79–80) Boston, Massachusetts, United States
- Education: Princeton University (BA); Stanford University (MA, PhD)

Harry Harding (born 1946) is an American political scientist specializing in Chinese politics and foreign affairs. He was the founding dean of the Batten School of Leadership and Public Policy at the University of Virginia, and previously served as dean of the Elliott School of International Affairs at George Washington University. Harding has advised several US presidents on developments in the PRC; before the Tiananmen Square demonstrations he was brought to Camp David for informal discussions with the George H. W. Bush administration. He has written several books, including China's Second Revolution and A Fragile Relationship: The United States and China Since 1972. Harding has a Chinese name: 何汉理 (Pinyin: Hé Hànlǐ).

== Biography ==
Harding was born in Boston, Massachusetts in 1946. He received his BA in public and international affairs in 1967 from Princeton University, and his MA (1969) and PhD (1974) in political science from Stanford University.

Harding served on the political science faculties of Swarthmore College (1970–71) and Stanford University (1971–83) and was a national fellow at the Hoover Institution. He then became senior fellow in the foreign policy studies program at the Brookings Institution (1983–94), and, later, dean of the Elliott School of International Affairs at George Washington University, a post he held for more than 10 years (January 1995 – June 30, 2005). Harding is widely credited for making the Elliott School an internationally competitive graduate program. Upon his retirement from that post, Harding accepted a university professorship at the school. On August 1, 2005, Harding joined Eurasia Group, a global political risk consultancy, as the firm's Director of Research and Analysis. He is currently a senior advisor at the firm.

In 2007, he returned to the Elliott School of International Affairs as University Professor of International Affairs at the Sigur Center. He left the Elliott School effective July 1, 2009 to become the founding dean of the Frank Batten School of Leadership and Public Policy at the University of Virginia.

When Harding retired from the deanship of the Batten School in 2014, he was named a university professor at the University of Virginia. In January 2015, he assumed a concurrent appointment as visiting professor of Social Science at the Hong Kong University of Science and Technology. Since leaving that position in January 2018, he has been a visiting professor at the University of Hong Kong and National Chengchi University in Taiwan, where he was appointed a Yushan Scholar by the Ministry of Education.

Between 1992 and 2004, Harding served on The Asia Foundation's board of trustees.

== Selected bibliography ==
- Organizing China: The Problem of Bureaucracy, 1949–1976 (Stanford University Press, 1981), ISBN 0-8047-1080-5
- China's Foreign Relations in the 1980s (Yale University Press, 1984), ISBN 0-300-03207-2 (ed.)
- China's Second Revolution: Reform After Mao (Brookings Institution, 1987), ISBN 0-8157-3462-X
- China and Northeast Asia: The Political Dimension (University Press of America, 1988), ISBN 0-8191-6591-3
- Sino-American Relations, 1945-1955: A Joint Reassessment of a Critical Decade (SR Books, 1989), ISBN 0-8420-2333-X (ed. with Yuan Ming)
- A Fragile Relationship: The United States and China Since 1972 (Brookings Institution, 1992), ISBN 0-8157-3466-2
- The India-China Relationship: What the United States Needs to Know (Columbia University Press, 2004), ISBN 0-231-13236-0 (ed. with Francine R. Frankel)
