= Sarah Ella Wilson =

Educator and clubwoman

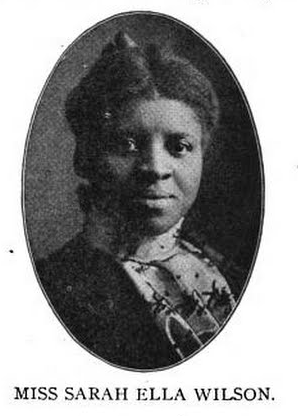
Sarah Ella Wilson, from a 1916 publication.

Sarah Ella Wilson (April 7, 1874 – November 1, 1955) was an African American educator and clubwoman based in Massachusetts.

== Early life ==
Sarah Ella Wilson was born in Worcester, Massachusetts, the daughter of George M. and Elizabeth Allen Wilson. She was named for her parents' friend and teacher, abolitionist Sarah Chase. Chase mentored young Sarah, taking her on trips and teaching her to play piano. Sarah Ella Wilson was educated at Classical High School in Worcester, and at Worcester Normal School, finishing in 1894.

== Career ==
Sarah Ella Wilson was one of the first two African American schoolteachers in Worcester. She taught first grade classes at Belmont Street Elementary School for almost fifty years, from 1895 to her retirement in 1944. Local lore holds that she missed just one day of teaching in all that time.

Wilson was an active clubwoman. She was a member of the Worcester Women's Progressive Club, and vice-president of the Home for Aged Colored People. She was active in the local Negro Women's Club, and the Worcester Inter-Racial Council, and the local NAACP chapter. She was treasurer of the Northeastern Federation of Colored Women's Clubs, a body of the National Association of Colored Women, for twenty-five years, and chaired the NACW scholarship committee. She was also an active member in her church.

== Personal life and legacy ==
Sarah Ella Wilson died in 1955, aged 81 years. Her portrait hangs in the library at Belmont Street School. There is a scholarship named for her at Worcester State University, established by former student Saul Feingold, intended to "support an African American student majoring in either Elementary Education or minoring in Secondary Education who plans to teach after graduation."

Poet Corrine Bostic wrote a biography of Sarah Ella Wilson, Go Onward and Upward (1974).
