= Jimmy Kang =

- Origin: Worcester
- Genre: Hip Hop
- Occupations: Music producer
- Years active: 1999 – present

Jimmy Kang The CEO and founder of Str8Up Entertainment Group INC. has made significant accomplishments with 20 years of experience in the music industry. He is a music producer and manager known for hip-hop who is currently the vice president for Wu-Tang Management and is operating Protect Ya Neck Records. Jimmy Kang facilitates other businesses under Wu-Tang Management; Protect Ya Neck Records, Protect ya Neck Distribution, Wu-World Radio, Wu- World Dj Coalition. He also owns Exclusives "Music meets fashion" in the heart of downtown Worcester Ma across the city hall for over 10 years along with Str8up Media Institute where he helps artists with all media aspects of the music industry. He is also the co-owner of Miss Central Massachusetts beauty pageant to empower young girls and women to take their career to the next level. Jimmy also owns a convenient store in downtown Worcester. He runs a custom clothing shop where he showcases the clothing at Exclusives along with doing in-stores for artist and fashion designers. Jimmy is also a board member in Probus Inc. partners with Thunder studios out of Long Beach California. Jimmy also Hosted at 97.9 FM Unity Radio out of Worcester Ma. to help evolve the city to the next level in cannabis awareness. He was a co-host for Cannabis 101 where he helped educate the public about cannabis that has become legal in the state of Massachusetts. Jimmy got into the boxing world and opened up a Boxing gym in Las Vegas with one of the world's best trainer Rafael Ramos.

Originally from Seoul, South Korea and raised in Los Angeles, Kang later moved to Massachusetts to pursuit a hockey career playing for the Boston Junior Bruins. which would later spawn into a transition to the music industry while going to college at Worcester State University. While in College he became a promoter to managing 5 night clubs everyday in the city of Worcester Ma. to become one of the top promoters in New England. Jimmy is known for his perceptive business skills and being able to adapt to his surroundings regardless of the environment. His first introduction to the music industry came through Krumbsnatcha (an artist), who is affiliated with legendary rap group Gang Starr.

After learning the ropes of the underground scene in 2001 Kang would go on to develop STR8UP Entertainment in Worcester, Massachusetts while helping Gang Starr Foundation member Krumb Snatcha create his record label, W.O.L.V.E.S. Entertainment, and produced the albums Krumb Snatcha Classics and Hate Me More. He signed Special Teamz Edo.G, Jaysaun and Slaine to his own label, Str8Up Entertainment and released the group's first album, The Mixtape. His label released the hit "Main Event" produced by DJ Premier off the group's album Stereotypez. After earning 7 awards at the ‘MIC Awards’, (5 for slaine, one for the best group, and best single). Jimmy was then offered a project from WPE Music distributed by Universal which would then give him an introduction to the corporate side of the industry. From this Jimmy gained respect as an innovator within the New England hip hop market.

In 2006 Kang was named one of "26 in 2006" people under 40 to watch by Pulse magazine in Worcester. Kang gained acclaim for bringing special events to the venues of Worcester. He also managed Club Red 1888, Canal Lounge, Voodoo Night Club, Club Universe, Octaine, Seven, and Keikos.

Kang was hired as a vice president for Wu Tang Management in 2009 and helped open up PYN records and Wu-World Radio for the world to hear. He currently operates Wu-Tang Management & Protect Ya Neck Records signing artist to the label and management. While Jimmy was a promoter and a club owner, he had set up shows with artists such as 50 cent, T.I., Freeway, G unit, and Rocka Fella, Neo, Lord Jamar, Buddha Monk, Cappadonna, Inspectha Deck, Kurupt, Roscoe, Raz B, Onyx Cannibus, Saigon, Armegadon, Tony Sunshine, Prospect, Beenie Seagle, Ricky Blaze, Blaq Poet, Dj Premier, Pete Rock, Large Professor, Keith Murray, Red Man, Erick Sermon, Busta Rhymes, DMX, New Boys, Baby Boy da prince, Method man, Inspectha Deck, U-God, Jim Jones, Cam'ron, JR Writer, Hell Rell, Joel Ortiz, Awesome 2, Clinton Sparks, Chubby Chubb, Tony Touch, Static Selectah, Hustle Simmons, G Spin, Rukiz, Frenchy Montana, Dip Set, Def Squad, Wu-Tang, Mario, Tok, Elephant Man, Sean Paul, Mr. Vegas, Guru, Nova Y Jori, Mengo Flow, Farruko and many more.

Since then, Jimmy has managed artists such as Junior Reid, Spliff Star, Young Dirty Bastard, KrumbSnatcha, Edo G, Slaine, Jaysaun, Rich Gates, Breje. He currently is working with Cappadonna of the Wu-Tang Clan, CORE of 36 chambers, Inspectha Deck, Kurupt, Roscoe, Onyx, Raz B, Big Nate Allstar, Scott Isbell, PBS Skinz. Str8up Entertainment Group just got signed to a distribution deal and is now signing artist and producers to distribute through Sony/Orchard.
