= Tyler Boudreau =

American writer

Tyler E. Boudreau is an American military veteran. After serving in the Iraq War, he wrote a book about his experiences in the Marine Corps and continues to be active in areas regarding the military, the war, and veterans issues.

== Life and career ==
Boudreau enlisted as an infantryman in the Marines in 1989 for four years, after which he returned to Massachusetts to attend Worcester State College. In 1994, he joined the Naval Reserve Officer Training Corps at the College of the Holy Cross, and, upon graduation, was commissioned a Second Lieutenant in 1997. Returning to the infantry, he served as a rifle and weapons platoon commander, and then went on to the Marine Corps Recruit Depot to train new recruits in San Diego.

On March 1, 2004, Captain Boudreau was deployed to Iraq as the Assistant Operations Officer for 2nd Battalion 2nd Marines based in Camp Lejeune, North Carolina. The battalion's area of operations in Iraq was initially the Northern Babil province, directly south of Baghdad. The battalion later moved to the southern border of Fallujah in April 2004 for the limited attacks that occurred during the first Siege of fallujah. After the siege was lifted, the battalion moved again to As Sadan, located along the Euphrates River just south of Abu Ghraib in al Anbar province. The battalion would later return to Northern Babil, from where they ultimately redeployed to the United States in October 2004.

After his return from Iraq, Tyler Boudreau assumed command of another rifle company, and prepared to deploy again to Iraq. By April 2005, however, his concerns about the war combined with his deep affection for his Marines caused him to relinquish his command and resign his commission.

Tyler Boudreau's final assignment for the military was the officer in charge of the 2nd Marine Regiment rear echelon. During this period, he served as the sole Casualty Assistance Calls Officer for the regiment and its battalions, spending his final days in the Marine Corps reporting casualties of war to their families.

=== Post-marine activity ===
After leaving the Marines, Boudreau wrote, Packing Inferno: The Unmaking of a Marine about his experiences in the Marine Corps and in War.

Over the summer of 2009, Boudreau cycled from the state of Washington to Massachusetts as part of his "The Other Side" Cycle Tour.

Boudreau is the 14th portrait in the 100 Faces of War Experience, offering a written statement called "The Dangers of Introspection" to the project.

Tyler Boudreau currently lives in Northampton, Massachusetts.
