= Honor system at the University of Virginia =

Honor code intended to be student administered

HONOR PLEDGE

On my honor as a student, I have neither given nor received aid on this assignment/examination.

The University of Virginia has an honor code, formally known as the Honor System and intended to be student-administered.

It was founded by Virginia students in 1842 after John A. G. Davis, chairman of the faculty and professor of law, who was attempting to resolve a conflict between students, was shot to death. The University had at that point a 17-year history of ongoing tensions between students and faculty over strictly enforced discipline, hours, and dress. Students found particularly galling the impugning of their honor by stringent supervision during tests: "[t]he students were allowed to bring only a pencil to the classroom, they were forbidden to speak, and the professors, operating in shifts, watched them with 'lynx-like' eyes during the course of the examinations." Law professor Henry St. George Tucker, Sr., proposed a basic honor pledge as an alternative to faculty oversight.

Originally the honor system only applied to allegations of cheating, although it was subsequently expanded to hold students to a general standard of gentlemanly conduct: the shared values of an all white, all male Southern aristocratic tradition. In modern times, the Honor System is composed of only three simple tenets: a student will not lie, cheat, or steal. It extends to matters academic and personal. For the first 180 years of the Honor System’s existence, the sole sanction for a confirmed Honor System violation was dismissal from the university. This was called the "single sanction system". Following a successful referendum of the student body, the penalty was changed to a two semester suspension beginning in the spring of 2022.

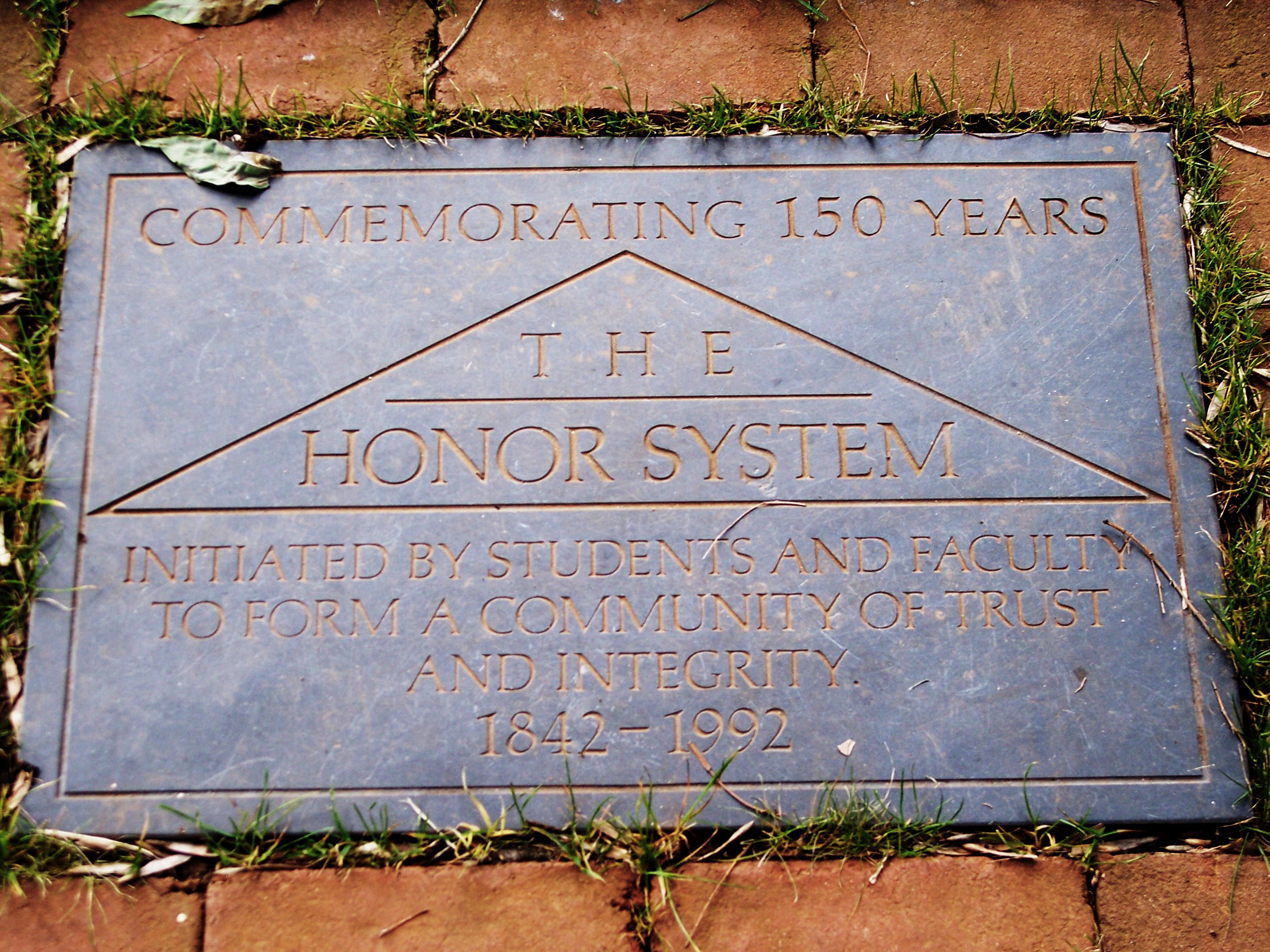
A plaque regarding 150 years of the Honor System, placed on the Lawn in 1992

The system was frequently criticized because the required severe penalty may prevent more moderate violations from being reported or acted upon. Although students have voted on numerous proposals over several decades to weaken or eliminate the single sanction, none had ever succeeded. Support for the honor system has waned in recent years, and in the spring of 2007 a non-binding referendum to replace the single sanction with a tiered, multiple sanction system received 49.5% of the votes cast, falling just 62 votes shy of a majority. Finally in the spring of 2022, a sanction reform referendum succeeded with more than 80% of the vote, changing the penalty for an Honor violation from expulsion to a two semester suspension.

While cheating convictions are relatively rare (24 students were dismissed during the 2003 academic year, and 21 more were dismissed in 2004), a large cheating scandal occurred in 2001. Physics professor and Hereford College Dean Louis Bloomfield, based on a student's complaint, suspected that some of his students copied portions of their term papers from fraternity archives in his Introduction to Physics class. After devising a computer program to detect copied phrases of at least six sequential words, over 150 students were accused of plagiarizing or allowing others to plagiarize their work over the previous five semesters. Although over 100 of these students were eventually exonerated, 48 students were convicted, and were therefore dismissed from the university. Three of these students had already graduated, and their degrees were subsequently revoked.

Lawsuits have challenged the honor system, such as a 1983 case brought by an expelled law student that reached the Fourth Circuit Court of Appeals. Although he did receive an additional honor trial, at which he was acquitted of honor violations, the appeals court decision found the honor system to be constitutional, and did not award him attorney's fees. Courts so far have concluded the system affords due process sufficient to satisfy constitutional expectations.

However, there has been at least one case of UVA administration interference in an honor proceeding under the threat of a lawsuit. In 1993 an Honor Trial convicted Christopher Leggett of cheating. The Honor Committee of that year insisted Leggett had received a fair trial but President John Casteen called it flawed, after Leggett's family hired Williams & Connolly, a law firm. The President and Board of Visitors forced the Executive Committee of the Honor Committee to grant a new trial (not provided for in the Honor bylaws) and in the second trial the student jury acquitted Leggett. One Honor Committee member resigned because of the administration's interference.
