= Thomas B. Fordham Institute =

American nonprofit organization

- Logo of the Thomas B. Fordham Institute
- Formation: 1997
- Type: Education policy think tank
- Headquarters: 1015 18th St NW, Suite 902
- Location: Washington, D.C. 20036
- Coordinates: 38.9032°N 77.0414°W
- President: Michael J. Petrilli
- President Emeritus: Chester E. Finn Jr.
- Revenue: $4,932,903 (2021)
- Expenses: $3,434,518 (2021)
- Website: www.fordhaminstitute.org

The Thomas B. Fordham Institute is an ideologically conservative American nonprofit education policy advocacy group, with offices in Washington, D.C., Columbus, Ohio, and Dayton, Ohio. The institute publishes research on education policy in the United States and promotes the privatization of schools.

== History ==
The Institute's eponym was a businessman and civic leader in Dayton, Ohio. His widow, Thelma Fordham Pruett, established the Thomas B. Fordham Foundation in 1959 to support a wide range of causes in the Dayton area. In 1997, following the death of Pruett, the Foundation was relaunched, with a narrowed focus on education. The Thomas B. Fordham Institute joined the Thomas B. Fordham Foundation in 2002. In 2013, the Associated Press described the organization as "conservative-leaning."

== Fordham-National ==
The headquarters of the think-tank operations are located in Washington, D.C. Led by Chester E. Finn Jr. and Michael J. Petrilli, Fordham publishes and supports research on K-12 education across the nation. Additionally, Fordham staff and board members remain involved in organizations that support and develop quality schools.

== Fordham-Ohio ==
Fordham-Ohio publishes research and does policy work in the Columbus office and serves as a community school sponsor in its Dayton office. The Thomas B. Fordham Foundation was approved in 2004 by the Ohio Department of Education—making it the first nonprofit organization in Ohio to acquire such a responsibility.

== Board of trustees ==
Current

Bruno V. Manno - Senior Advisor, Progressive Policy Institute
Chester E. Finn Jr. - Distinguished Senior Fellow and President Emeritus, Thomas B. Fordham Institute
Thomas A. Holton, Esq. - Former Counsel to the Firm, Porter Wright Morris & Arthur
Michael W. Kelly - President and CEO, Central Park Credit Bank
Michael J. Petrilli - President, Thomas B. Fordham Institute
Ian Rowe - Resident Fellow, American Enterprise Institute
Stefanie Sanford - President, Civic Ventures at Alithi Consulting and Humanitae Philanthropy Advisors
Caprice Young - CEO and Superintendent, Navigator Schools

Emeritus

Stephen D. Dackin - Former Superintendent of School and Community Partnerships, Columbus State Community College
David P. Driscoll - Former Commissioner of Education, Commonwealth of Massachusetts
Chester E. Finn, Esq. (1918-2007) - Former Senior Partner, Porter Wright Morris & Arthur
Craig Kennedy - Senior Fellow, Member of the Editorial Board, and Trustee at American Purpose; Former President of the German Marshall Fund of the United States
Bruce Kovner - Founder and Co-Chairman of The Kovner Foundation; Founder and Former Chairman of Caxton Associates
Rod Paige - Former U.S. Secretary of Education (2001-2005)
David H. Ponitz - CEO of David H. Ponitz Consultants; Former President of Sinclair Community College
Diane Ravitch - Founder and President of the Network for Public Education
