= University of Virginia School of Education and Human Development =

Public school in Charlottesville, Virginia

Coordinates: 38.035670°N 78.508225°W

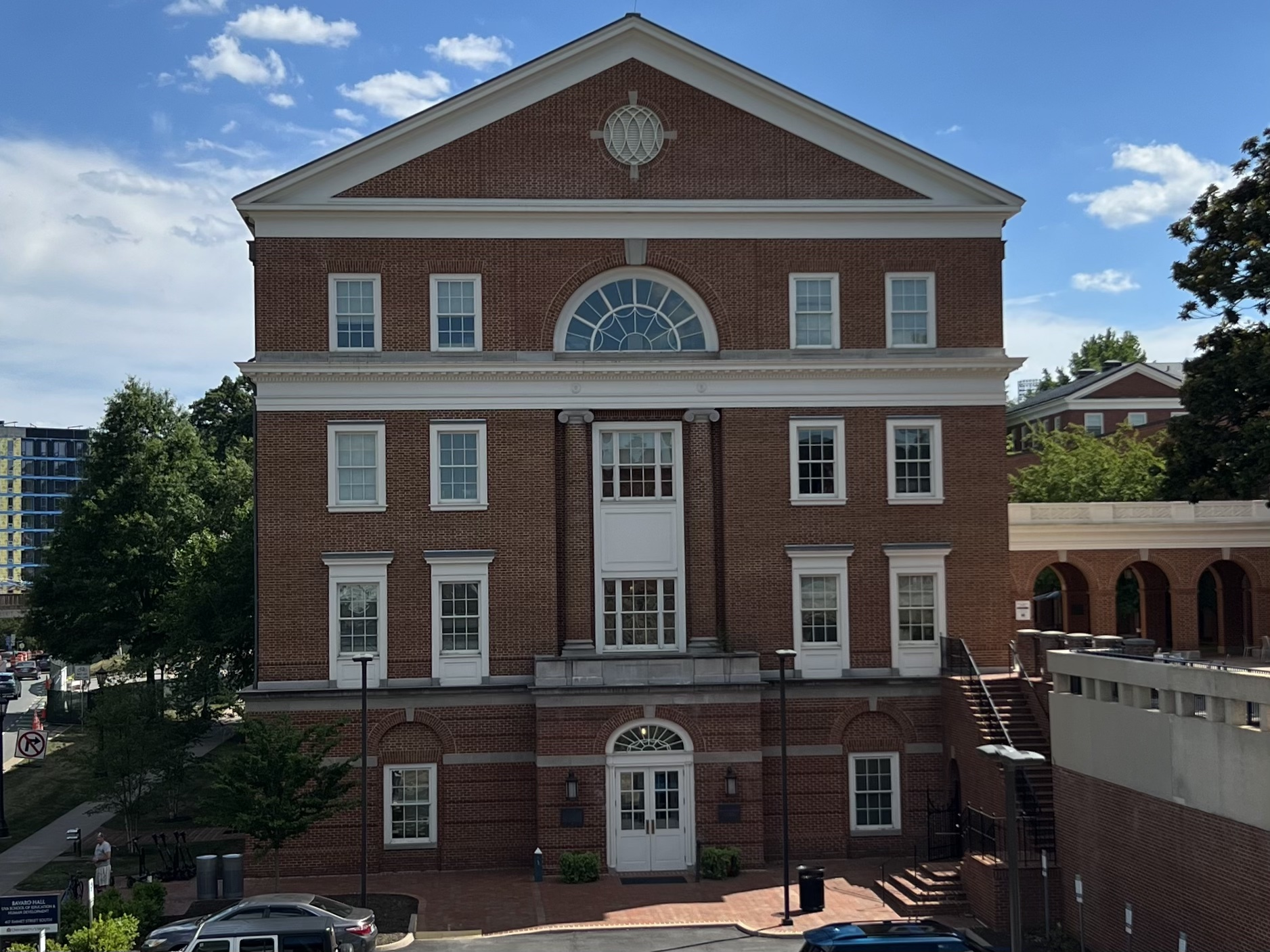
Bavaro Hall at the University of Virginia; home to the School of Education and Human Development.

The University of Virginia School of Education and Human Development is a public school of education in Charlottesville, Virginia, United States. The School of Education and Human Development offers professional programs designed to prepare individuals for a variety of careers related to the practice of education. The current dean of the School of Education and Human Development is Stephanie J. Rowley.

== History ==
The School of Education and Human Development, founded with two professorships in 1905, was endowed by gifts of $100,000 from John D. Rockefeller and $50,000 from the State General Education Fund. The school was originally named for Jabez Lamar Monroe Curry. Curry, a proponent of segregated public schools, was a White supremacist who supported enslavement of Black people and secession of the South from the United States. The University of Virginia Board of Visitors voted to drop Curry's name in 2020 because he was a "slaveholder, Confederate leader and opposed integrated schools."

In 1919, the school was placed upon a professional basis similar to that of the schools of law, medicine, and engineering. In 1950, a graduate division was established, offering the degrees of master of education and doctor of education. An Education Specialist degree was approved and initiated in 1974. The school continues to function as a department of the Graduate School of Arts and Sciences, offering the Master of Arts in Teaching and Doctor of Philosophy degrees.

In 1968, the School of Education and Human Development entered a period of rapid growth. By the mid 1970s, the faculty had increased to approximately 120 members, and there are now more than 20 specialized programs.

== Curriculum ==
The school offers several programs to students. A five-year Teacher Education program includes both a Bachelor of Arts and a Master of Arts in Teaching. Graduate programs include degrees in Master of Education, Education Specialist, Doctor of Education and Doctor of Philosophy. The undergraduate programs include Communication Disorders and Sports Medicine.

The School of Education and Human Development is organized into three areas of academic study.

• Human Services: Prepares individuals for professional careers in human development and clinical services (i.e., clinical and school psychology, counselor education, communication disorders, kinesiology, and risk and prevention in education sciences).

• Curriculum, Instruction and Special Education: Prepares students for teaching positions, pre-kindergarten through grade twelve, or for work as researchers and teacher educators working in higher education.

• Leadership, Foundations and Policy: Prepares students for leadership roles in administration, foundations of education, and educational policies.

The five-year teacher education program is sponsored jointly with the University of Virginia College of Arts and Sciences. The program leads to the simultaneous receipt of both a bachelor of arts degree from the college and master of teaching degree of the School of Education and Human Development. Students meeting all requirements are then certified to teach on the elementary or secondary level. Students wishing to pursue careers as teachers major in an academic discipline in the college and simultaneously begin professional courses leading to teacher certification.

Students apply to the School of Education and Human Development in their first or second year in the college. Throughout the teacher preparation program, they participate in clinical experiences, including observation, tutoring, and small- and large-group instruction.

Programs leading to teacher certification include specializations in early childhood, developmental risk, elementary education, secondary education, physical education, and special education. For secondary teachers, specializations are available in English, foreign languages, mathematics, sciences, and social studies.

Two additional programs areas are designed for students interested in pursuing human service careers related to communication disorders and physical education/sports medicine. These programs require that students transfer into the School of Education and Human Development and are designed to conclude after four years so that students may pursue additional graduate study. In communication disorders, the program provides pre-professional training in audiology and speech-language pathology. The program in sports medicine is a pre-physical therapy and pre-athletic training program. These programs provide the necessary academic and practical work for the four-year B.S.Ed. degree and for application to graduate programs in the related specialties.

== Facilities and Centers ==
The majority of facilities, offices, and classes through the UVA School of Education and Human Development are held in Ridley Hall, which includes its own education library. Centers at the School of Education and Human Development include the following:

- Center for the Advanced Study of Teaching and Learning
- Center for Academic Diversity and Excellence
- Center for the Study of Higher Education
- Center for Technology and Teacher Education
- Central VA Writing Project
- Darden-School of Education Partnership for Leaders in Education
- McGuffey Reading Center (Reading First and Phonological Awareness Literacy Screening)
- Saturday and Summer Enrichment Program
- Teachers for a New Era
- Virginia Youth Violence Project
- Young Women Leaders Program
- Young Writers Workshop
- Youth-Nex, The University of Virginia Center to Promote Effective Youth Development

== Rankings ==
In 2005, the U.S. News & World Report ranked a number of the School of Education and Human Development's graduate programs in education as some of the highest in the country, with Special Education ranked #5, Secondary Education ranked #7, and Educational Policy ranked #18. In their 2007 edition, the School of Education and Human Development was ranked #19 when compared with other national schools of education.

In 2002 the school was selected by the Carnegie Corporation as having one of the top teacher education programs in the country. The University of Virginia received a five-year, $5 million, Teachers for a New Era grant to develop new models in teacher education.

A 2006 report by Arthur Levine named the School among four "distinctive university-based teacher education programs that are exemplars in the field."
