= Marc Porat =

American businessman and investor

- Education: Columbia University (BA); Stanford University (PhD)
- Occupations: Entrepreneur, angel investor
- Known for: Founding General Magic, and coining the term "information economy"
- Spouse: Claire Tomkins
- Relatives: Ruth Porat (sister)

Marc Porat (born 1947) is an American technology entrepreneur, executive, and investor. He is known for his work on the concept of the information economy and for co-founding General Magic, an Apple spin-off that developed an early personal communicator device and intelligent software agents. He is a partner at Millennial Advisors, where he focuses on artificial intelligence.

Porat has also founded companies in telecommunications and sustainable building materials and has been involved in philanthropic work related to voter access.

== Early life and education ==
Marc Porat was born Uri Porat in 1947. His father, Dan Porat, was a physicist, and his mother, Frieda Porat, was a psychologist. The family emigrated from Israel to the United Kingdom and later to the United States, where his father worked at the Harvard University–MIT Cyclotron Laboratory and subsequently at Stanford University's SLAC National Accelerator Laboratory. A documentary about his father's life, titled Dan, was produced by Porat.

Porat graduated from Columbia College in 1972 and completed a Ph.D. at Stanford University in 1976. His dissertation, The Information Economy: Definition and Measurement, analyzed the growth of the information sector and introduced the concept of the information economy.

== Career ==
=== Early career ===
While at Stanford University, Porat was a research assistant on a project funded by the Advanced Research Projects Agency (ARPA), collaborating with Paul Baran and Vint Cerf.

After receiving his PhD, Porat served as an economist at the U.S. Department of Commerce. He was later a program director at the Aspen Institute, where he produced and hosted The Information Society, a PBS feature documentary film based on his dissertation. He also worked as a subject matter expert at Booz Allen Hamilton, advising on the deregulation of the telecommunications industry, and co-founded Private Satellite Network (PSN), a direct broadcast satellite company.

=== Apple Computer and General Magic ===
In 1988, Porat joined Apple Computer as a Director in the Advanced Technology Group, where he led a research project on the future of personal computing. The project was published by Apple as Whole Person Paradigm: Pocket Crystal. In 1990, the project was spun out of Apple as an independent startup, General Magic, which Porat co-founded with Andy Hertzfeld and Bill Atkinson. Porat served as its chairman and CEO. General Magic's objective was to create a personal communicator for email, messaging, and electronic commerce. The architecture utilized a network of software "agents" and a new programming language called Telescript for intelligent mobile agents. The company formed joint initiatives with Apple, Sony, Matsushita, Motorola, AT&T, NTT, France Telecom,Toshiba, Philips, and held its initial public offering in 1995. Its product was sold under brand names including the Sony Magic Link and the Motorola Envoy. In the late 1990s, the company also developed an early voice-command virtual assistant service called Portico. Porat served as the CEO of the company from 1991 to 1996. The company has since been cited as being ahead of its time, as many of its product concepts were precursors to later technologies. A documentary film about the company, “General Magic”, was released in 2018 and has won many awards.

=== Other ventures ===
In 1998, Porat founded Perfect Commerce, a business-to-business software company for online procurement. In 2002, he was a co-founder of Serious Materials (later Serious Energy), a company that produced energy efficient building materials. In 2007, he founded CalStar Cement (CalStar Products) to manufacture low-carbon building materials and Zeta Communities to build prefabricated net-zero-energy homes.

Porat is a partner at Millennial Advisors, a consultancy focused on artificial intelligence. He is also a senior advisor to SandboxAQ, a startup focused on AI and quantum computing and private equity firms.

== Philanthropy ==
Porat is the co-founder and chairman of My Ride to Vote, an organization that provides free ride share transportation for voters to polling stations. The initiative was created in partnership with Voto Latino to increase voter turnout by removing transportation barriers.

== Personal life ==
Porat is married to Claire Tomkins and resides in San Francisco. His sisters are Naomi Porat, an entrepreneur and sustainability consultant, and Ruth Porat, the President and chief investment officer of Alphabet Inc. and Google.
