= MediaFile =

Student news organization

- Type: Online magazine
- Owner(s): MediaFile Publishing, Inc.
- Founder: Scott Nover
- Editor-in-chief: Celine Castronuovo
- General manager: Julian Strachan
- Founded: 2016
- Website: www.mediafiledc.com

MediaFile is an independent student news organization at The George Washington University. Founded in 2016 in the District of Columbia, MediaFile covers the evolution of media and the future of news.

MediaFile is editorially and financially independent of GW, incorporated in D.C. with 501(c)(3) non-profit status.

== Mission ==
MediaFile is an online news publication devoted to the evolution of journalism. MediaFile claims to be D.C.’s singular source for media news and criticism, boasting a close look at Washington-based reporting as well as the industry as a whole. MediaFile is run independently by the students of the George Washington University School of Media and Public Affairs, and seeks to enrich the discourse about news coverage, industry trends, and media ethics.

== Founding ==
According to Poynter, the idea for MediaFile came about after the collapse of the American Journalism Review in August 2015. After AJR closed, which was based out of Philip Merrill College of Journalism at University of Maryland, College Park, there was no organization devoted to media criticism in Washington, D.C. MediaFile launched with approximately 30 writers and editors, favoring "quality over quantity" in its publishing standards. AdWeek's Fishbowl blog notes: "As students, MediaFile’s writers and reporters can fill an important role, armed as they are with their fresh, hungry eyes and academic understanding of the craft and practice of journalism and communications."

== Board of directors ==
MediaFile's board of directors includes students, academics, and journalists alike.
