= Ruth Porat =

American businessperson (born 1958)

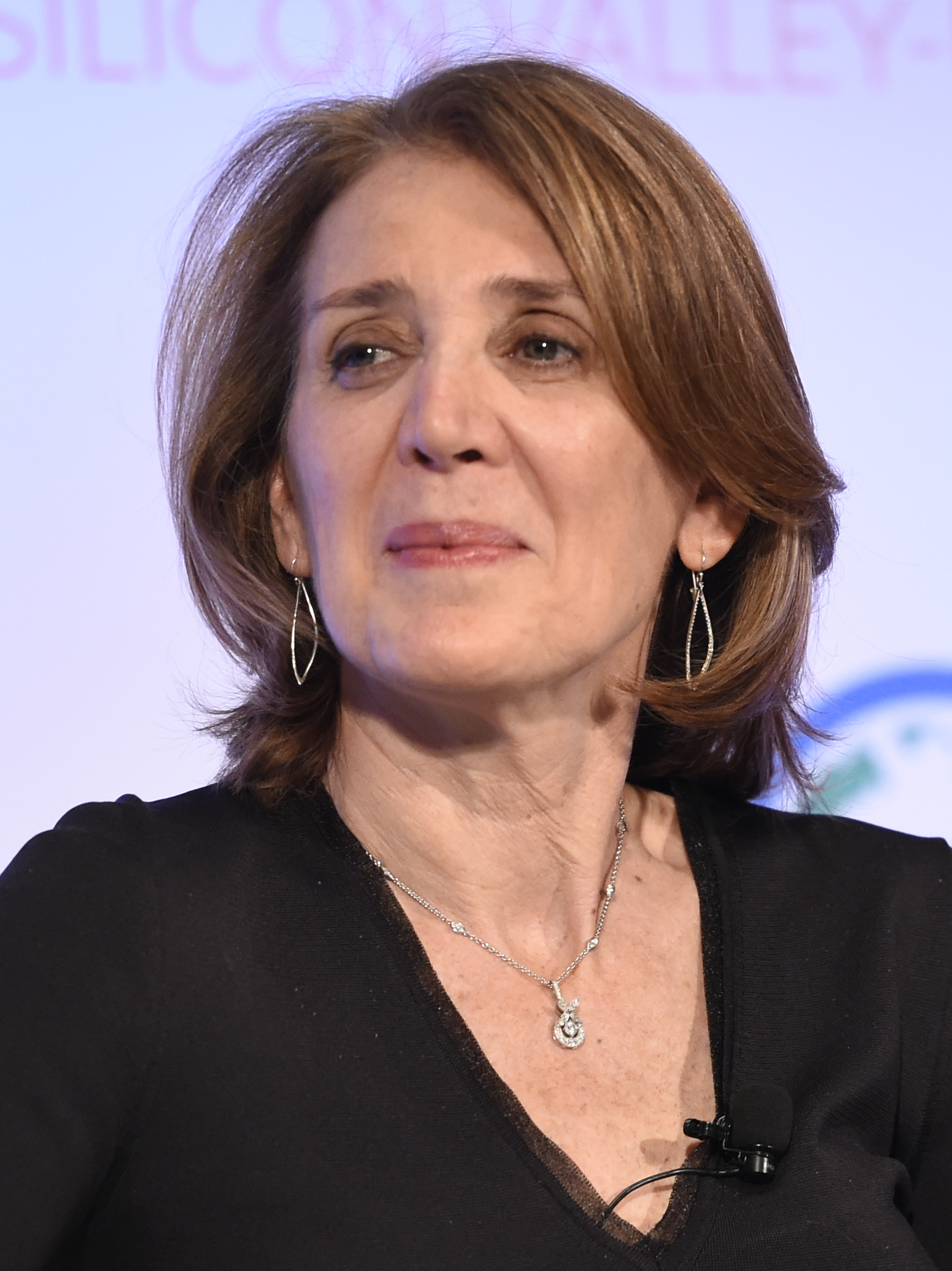
- Porat in 2016
- Born: 1957 (age 68–69); Sale, Cheshire, England, UK
- Education: Stanford University (BA); London School of Economics (MSc); University of Pennsylvania (MBA)
- Title: President and Chief Investment Officer of Google and Alphabet
- Spouse: Anthony Paduano
- Children: 3
- Relatives: Marc Porat (brother)

Ruth Porat (born 1957) is a British-American business executive who is the president and chief investment officer of Alphabet and its subsidiary Google LLC and prior to that was the chief financial officer of the same companies from 2015 to 2024. Prior to joining Google, Porat was the executive vice president and chief financial officer of Morgan Stanley from January 2010 to May 2015.

In 2024, Porat was listed as the 12th most powerful woman in the world by Forbes, and sixth on Fortune's Most Powerful Women list.

== Early life and education ==
Porat was born to a Jewish family in Sale, Cheshire, England, the daughter of Dan and Frieda Porat. Her mother was born in Israel, and her father fled Vienna on Kristallnacht and found his way to Israel, enlisted in the British Army as a teenager and later fought in the 1948 Arab–Israeli War. Her father's testimony about surviving Nazi German persecution of Jews was taken by the USC Shoah Foundation Institute in 1996. She has a brother, Marc Porat, who founded General Magic.

Porat moved at a young age to Cambridge, Massachusetts, where her father was a research fellow in the physics department at Harvard University. His visa was sponsored by John F. Kennedy, then a U.S. Senator. A byproduct of her father's research was ion implantation, which found application in the development of the semiconductor. Three years later, her father relocated the family to Palo Alto, California, where he worked at Stanford University's SLAC National Accelerator Laboratory for 26 years. At SLAC he developed a spark chamber spectrometer used in the discovery of subatomic particles for which SLAC Director Burton Richter was awarded the Nobel Prize in Physics in 1976. He worked closely with Nobel Prize-laureate Melvin Schwartz and Stanley Wojcicki, father of Porat's future colleague Susan Wojcicki.

Porat holds a B.A. in economics and international relations from Stanford University, a M.Sc. in industrial relations from the London School of Economics, and a M.B.A. with distinction from the Wharton School of the University of Pennsylvania.

== Career ==
=== Morgan Stanley ===
Porat began her career at Morgan Stanley in 1987 and left in 1993 to follow Morgan Stanley president Robert F. Greenhill to Smith Barney and returned to Morgan Stanley in 1996. Before becoming CFO, she served as vice chairman of investment banking from September 2003 to December 2009 and the global head of the Financial Institutions Group from September 2006 to December 2009. She was previously co-head of technology investment banking and worked for Morgan Stanley in London. While a banker at Morgan Stanley, she was credited with creating the European debt financing that saved Amazon from collapse during the dot-com melt down in 2000. Her financial partner during the Dot-com bubble was Mary Meeker, the godmother to Porat's three children. In a 2014, Politico published an articled titled "Porat: The Most Powerful Woman On Wall Street".

During the 2008 financial crisis, Porat led the Morgan Stanley team advising the United States Department of the Treasury regarding Fannie Mae and Freddie Mac, and the New York Federal Reserve Bank with respect to AIG. In May 2011, she presented to the Bretton Woods Committee hosted by the International Monetary Fund in Washington, D.C., on post-crisis reform and financial legislation, and to the World Economic Forum in Davos in 2013 on "trust" levels within and of the financial sector.

In 2013, it was reported that President Barack Obama would nominate Porat as the next Deputy Secretary of the Treasury. However, it was reported later by Bloomberg News and The New York Times that Porat had contacted White House officials to withdraw her name from consideration because of improving conditions at Morgan Stanley and the acrimonious confirmation process inflicted upon then Treasury Secretary-nominee Jack Lew.

Porat's career was analyzed in the McKinsey & Company study "How Remarkable Women Lead". She was named "Best Financial Institutions CFO" in a poll conducted by Institutional Investor for its "2014 All-America Executive Team".

=== Google ===
On March 24, 2015, it was announced that Porat would join Google as its new CFO as of May 26, 2015. Bloomberg Business reported that her hiring deal amounted to $70 million. She has been credited with boosting Google's share price by reorganizing the company and imposing financial discipline. For the "2018 All America Executive Team", she was named "Best Internet CFO" by Institutional Investor. Porat spoke at the Fortune Most Powerful Women Summit in Dana Point, California, on October 19, 2016, in her capacity as CFO of Alphabet Inc. and Google. At Google, in addition to Finance, Porat also has Business Operations, Real Estate and Work Place Services reporting to her. She was paid $50 million in 2020, $47 million in 2018, and $39 million in 2016.

In July 2023, Porat was promoted to the newly created role of president and chief investment officer of Alphabet and Google starting from September 1, 2023. Her responsibilities include overseeing the company's "Other Bets" ventures, its private equity portfolios, and its investments in real estate, infrastructure and data centers.

On August 22, 2025, Porat spoke at the annual Jackson Hole Economic Policy Symposium hosted by the Federal Reserve Bank of Kansas City. In June, 2025, Porat gave a speech at ASCO on Google AI's advancements in cancer research.

== Board membership ==
- She is a member of the Board of Directors of Stanford University Management Company,
- The university's endowment, the Board of Trustees of Memorial Sloan Kettering Cancer Center,
- The Board of Directors of The Council on Foreign Relations,
- The Board of Directors of Bloomberg Philanthropies,
- The Board of Directors of The Blackstone Group.
- She previously served on the Board of Trustees of Stanford University,
- The Borrowing Advisory Committee of the United States Treasury,
- The Board of Trustees of the Economic Club of New York.
- She is a member of the Advisory Council of the Hutchins Center on Fiscal and Monetary Policy at the Brookings Institution,
- The Economic Strategy Group at the Aspen Institute.

== Political views ==
Porat supported Hillary Clinton for president in 2008 and 2016, hosting fundraisers for her at the Dakota in New York City.

In 2011, Porat expressed her support for increased taxes on the wealthy and declared on the topic of significant spending decreases that "we cannot cut our way to greatness".

In March 2025, San Francisco Mayor Daniel Lurie named Porat as co-chair of "The Partnership for San Francisco" alongside Laurene Powell Jobs.

== Personal life ==
Porat has been married to Anthony Paduano, a partner in the law firm Paduano & Weintraub, since 1983. Porat is a survivor of breast cancer.

In September 2015, Porat reportedly paid $30 million for a house in Palo Alto. In 2016, she gave the commencement address for graduates of the Wharton School.

== In popular culture ==
In the 2011 HBO movie Too Big to Fail, Porat is played by Jennifer van Dyck.
