= Mobile object =

Mobile object may refer to:

- Mob (video games), a computer-controlled non-player character (NPC) in a computer game such as an MMORPG or MUD
- Mobile agent, a composition of computer software and data that is able to migrate (move) from one computer to another autonomously and continue its execution on the destination computer
