= Telescript =

Telescript may refer to:

- Teleprompter, a display device that prompts the person speaking with an electronic visual text
- Telescript (programming language), a programming language developed by General Magic
- Telescript, a name sometimes used to refer to the script written for a teleplay
- The process of U1 snRNP preventing premature cleavage and polyadenylation of nascent mRNA transcripts is called telescripting.
