= Surace =

Surace is a Southern Italian surname. Notable people with the surname include:

- Bob Surace (born 1968), American college football coach
- Kevin Surace (born 1962), American technology innovator, speaker and entrepreneur
