= Computer image =

Computer image may refer to:

- Computer-generated imagery, still or moving imagery created by or with help of a computer.
- System image, a serialized (backup) copy of the entire state of a computer system.
