= Information economy =

Economy where information is valued as a capital good

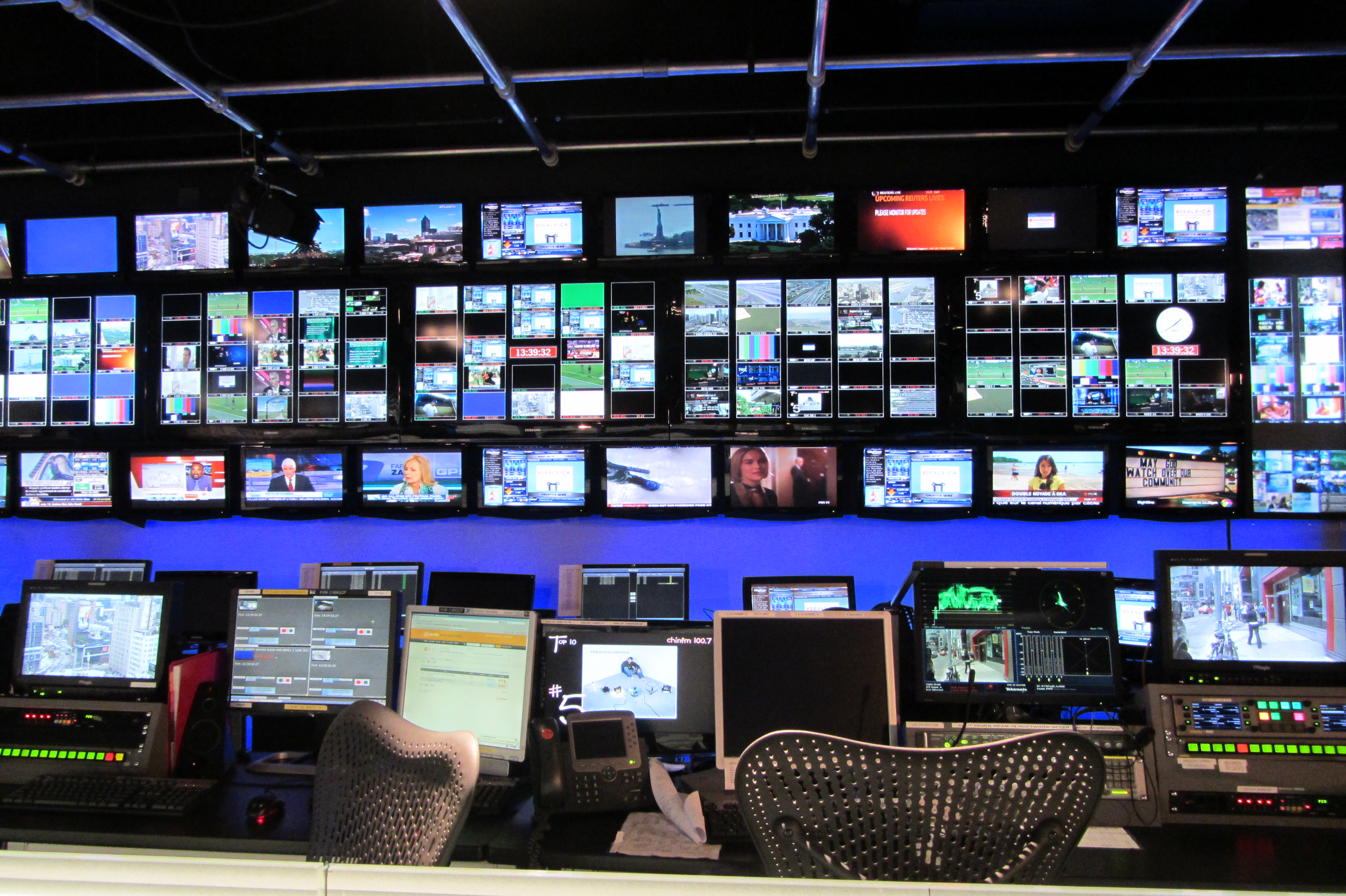
The media industry is an example of the information economy.

Information economy is an economy with an increased emphasis on informational activities and information industry, where information is valued as a capital good. The term was coined by Marc Porat, a graduate student at Stanford University, who would later co-found General Magic.

Manuel Castells states that information economy is not mutually exclusive with manufacturing economy. He finds that some countries such as Germany and Japan exhibit the informatization of manufacturing processes. In a typical conceptualization, however, information economy is considered a "stage" or "phase" of an economy, coming after stages of hunting, agriculture, and manufacturing. This conceptualization can be widely observed regarding information society, a closely related but wider concept.

There are numerous characterizations of the transformations some economies have undergone. Service economy, high-tech economy, late-capitalism, post-Fordism, and global economy are among the most frequently used terms, having some overlaps and contradictions among themselves. Closer terms to information economy would include knowledge economy.

== Knowledge workers ==
In The Effective Executive by Peter Drucker, Drucker describes the manual worker (page 2) who works with his hands and produces "stuff". The knowledge worker (page 3) works with his head and produces ideas, knowledge, and information.

== See also ==
- Capitalism – Economic system based on private ownership
- Creative industry – Economic sector
- Digital economy – Economy based on digital computing technologies
- Dynamic pricing – Pricing strategy
- Electronic business – Business that takes place over the internet
- Electronic commerce – Type of business industry usually conducted over the internet
- Information superhighway – Term used in the 1990s to refer to the Internet
- Information market – Digital information sold and distributed via networks, I-Commerce.
- Information revolution – Industrial shift to information technology
- Information society – Society driven by the processing and communication of information
- Intellectual property – Ownership of creative expressions and processes
- Knowledge economy – Approach to generating value
- Knowledge market – Mechanism for distributing knowledge resources
- Knowledge policy – Institutional foundations for creating, managing, and using organizational knowledge
- Network economics – Increasing value with increasing participation
- Online advertising – Form of advertising that uses the Internet
- Platform capitalism – Business model of technological platforms
- Surveillance capitalism – Concept in political economics
- Virtual economy – Emergent economy existing in a virtual world
