= Magic Cap =

- Desk at startup
- Developer: General Magic
- Working state: Discontinued
- Source model: Closed source
- Initial release: 28 September 1994; 32 years ago
- Final release: 3.1.2j / 2001; 25 years ago
- Marketing target: Mobile computing
- Influenced: Palm OS, iOS
- Influenced by: Classic Mac OS
- License: Proprietary

Support status
- Unsupported

Magic Cap (short for Magic Communicating Applications Platform) is a discontinued object-oriented operating system for PDAs developed by General Magic. Tony Fadell was a contributor to the platform, and Darin Adler was an architect.

Its graphical user interface incorporates a room metaphor, where the user navigates between rooms to perform tasks, such as going to a home office to perform word processing, or to a file room to clean up the system files. Automation is based on mobile agents but not an office assistant.

Several electronic companies came to market with Magic Cap devices, including the Sony Magic Link and the Motorola Envoy, both released in 1994. None of these devices were commercial successes.

== Mobile agents ==
The Magic Cap operating system includes a new mobile agent technology named Telescript. Conceptually, the agents carry work orders, travel to a Place outside of the handheld device, complete their work, and then return to the device with the results. When the Magic Cap devices were delivered, the only Place for agents to travel was the PersonaLink service provided by AT&T. The agents had little access to functionality, because each agent had to be strictly authorized and its scope of inquiry was limited to the software modules installed on the PersonaLink servers. The payload carried by these agents was also hampered by the slow dial-up modem speed of 2400 bit/s.

The authentication and authorization system of the mobile agents in Telescript created a high coupling between the device and the target Place. As a result, deployment of agent-based technology was incredibly difficult, and never reached fruition before the PersonaLink service was shut down.

== See also ==
- Apple Newton
- Microsoft Bob
- Danger Hiptop
