= Code mobility =

Process in distributed computing

In distributed computing, code mobility is the ability for running programs, code or objects to be migrated (or moved) from one machine or application to another. This is the process of moving mobile code across the nodes of a network as opposed to distributed computation where the data is moved.

It is common practice in distributed systems to require the movement of code or processes between parts of the system, instead of data.

Examples of code mobility include scripts downloaded over a network (for example JavaScript, VBScript), Java applets, ActiveX controls, Flash animations, Shockwave movies (and Xtras), and macros embedded within Microsoft Office documents.

== Overview ==
The purpose of code mobility is to support sophisticated operations. For example, an application can send an object to another machine, and the object can resume executing inside the application on the remote machine with the same state as it had in the originating application.

According to a classification proposed by Fuggetta, Picco and Vigna, code mobility can be either strong or weak: strong code mobility involves moving both the code, data and the execution state from one host to another, notably via a process image (this is important in cases where the running application needs to maintain its state as it migrates from host to host), while weak code mobility involves moving the code and the data only. Therefore, it may be necessary to restart the execution of the program at the destination host.

Several paradigms, or architectural styles, exist within code mobility:

- Remote evaluation – A client sends code to a remote machine for execution.
- Code on demand – A client downloads code from a remote machine to execute locally.
- Mobile agents – Objects or code with the ability to migrate between machines autonomously.

== Viruses ==
Mobile code can also download and execute in the client workstation via email. Mobile code may download via an email attachment (e.g., macro in a Word file) or via an HTML email body (e.g., JavaScript). For example, the ILOVEYOU, TRUELOVE, and AnnaK emails viruses/worms all were implemented as mobile code (VBScript in a .vbs email attachment that executed in Windows Scripting Host). In almost all situations, the user is not aware that mobile code is downloading and executing in their workstation.

== Renting code ==
Mobile code also refers to code "used for rent", a way of making software packages more affordable. i.e. to use on demand. This is specially relevant to the mobile devices being developed which are cellular phones, PDAs, etc. all in one. Instead of installing software packages, they can be "leased" and paid for on a per-usage basis.

== See also ==
- Code on demand
- Mobile agent
- Remote evaluation
