= Frank Sesno =

American journalist

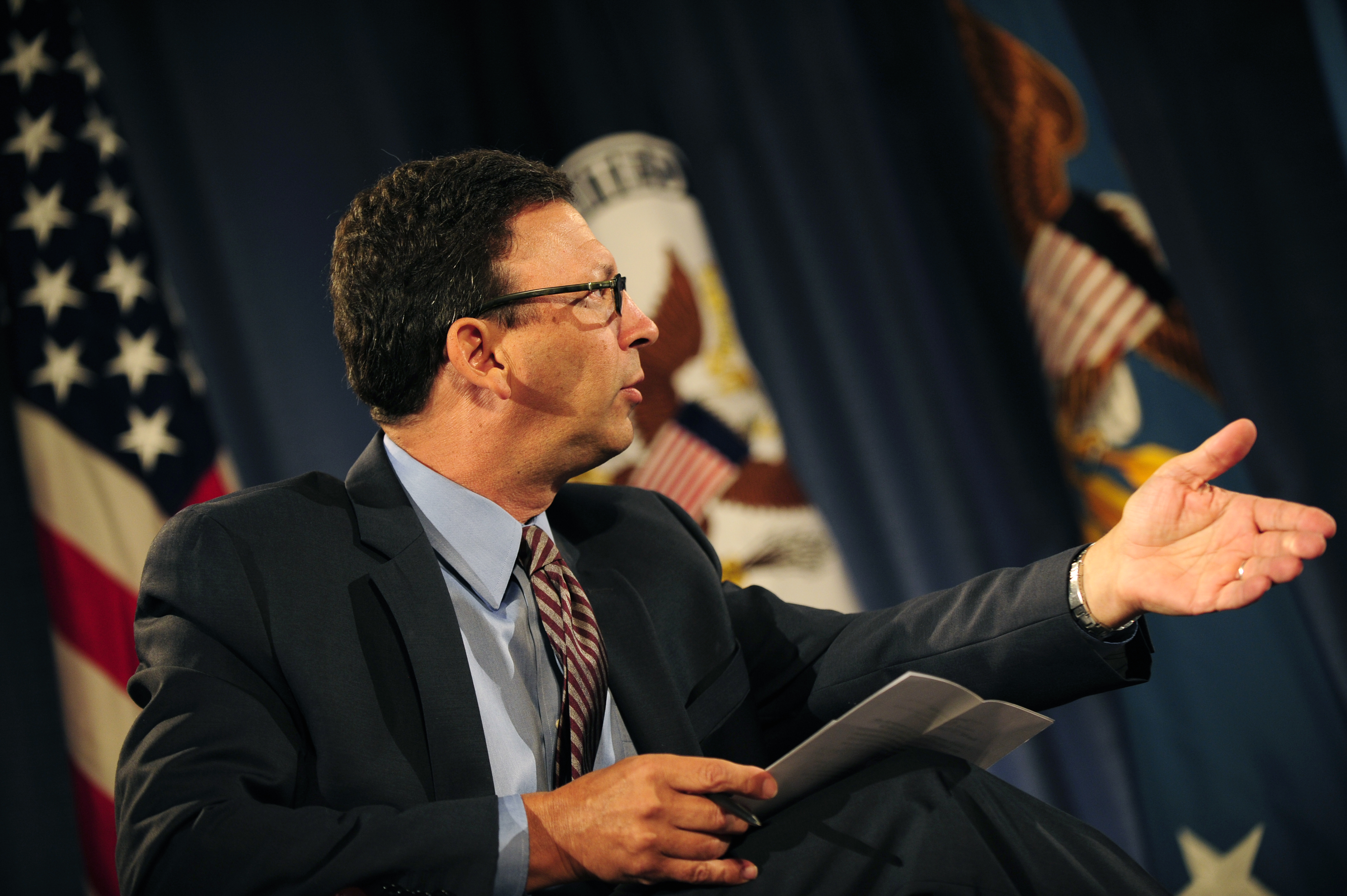
- Sesno moderating a televised conversation between Secretary of State Hillary Clinton and Defense Secretary Leon E. Panetta; 2011.

Former Director of the School of Media and Public Affairs
- In office September 2009 – June 2020
- Succeeded by: Silvio Waisbord

Personal details
- Education: Middlebury College

Frank Sesno is an American journalist, former CNN correspondent, anchor, and Washington bureau chief. He is also author, and former director of the School of Media and Public Affairs at The George Washington University. Sesno is the creator and host of Planet Forward, a web-to-television show on PBS. Sesno is a professor of Media and Public Affairs at the George Washington University. Sesno assumed the Director's role at the School of Media and Public Affairs in September 2009 and stepped down from the role in June 2020. In 2020, Sesno announced he would serve as the school's director of strategic initiatives.

== Career ==
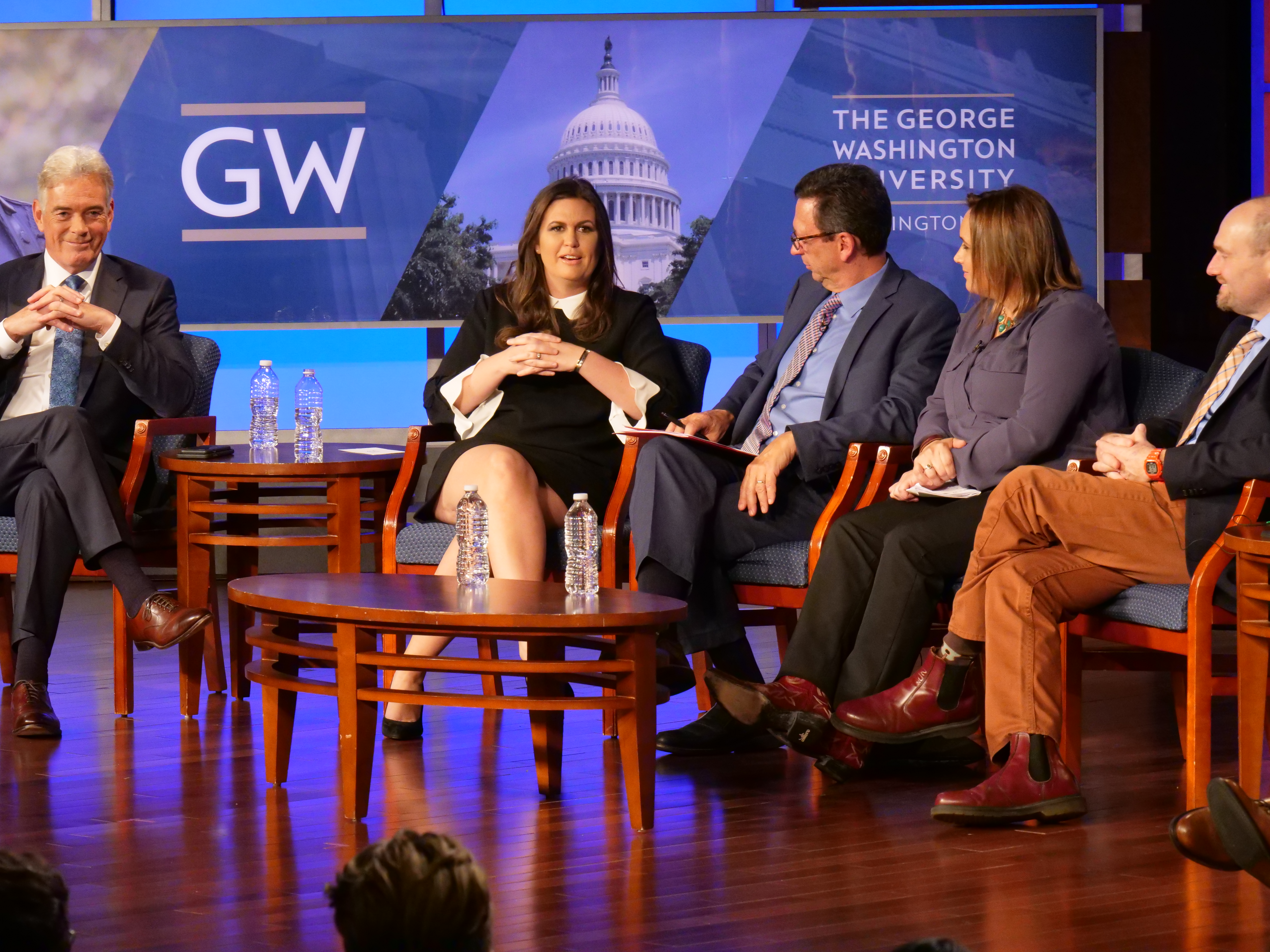
Sesno moderated Trump's First Year, an event held with White House press secretary Sarah Huckabee Sanders and the chief correspondents from The New York Times, CNN, Fox News, and the president of the White House Correspondents' Association; hosted by the SMPA in 2017.

Sesno received his Bachelor of Arts from Middlebury College in 1977, where he would later serve as one of its trustees. Sesno worked as news director at WCFR, a local radio station in Springfield, Vermont, where he hosted an interview show Checkpoint every day. Before joining CNN in 1984, Sesno worked as a radio correspondent at the White House and in London for the Associated Press. During his CNN career, he served in many parts of the world, as well as Washington bureau chief. He has also worked with PBS, producing several shows about political topics, including U.S. homeland security and Iraq. Sesno's diverse career spans over 25 years of experience, including 18 years at CNN, where he still continues to serve as a special correspondent. His current work at CNN involves producing documentaries, among other reporting and commentary responsibilities. Sesno has interviewed business and government leaders including U.S. Presidents George W. Bush, Bill Clinton, George H. W. Bush, and Ronald Reagan and former General Electric Co. CEO Jack Welch, the late Palestinian leader Yasser Arafat, Egyptian President Hosni Mubarak, and Israeli Prime Minister Benjamin Netanyahu. He covered stories ranging from the Iraq War to the disputed U.S. presidential election of 2000.

Frank Sesno is a member of the Council on Foreign Relations. His most recent project, Planet Forward, serves to bridge the gap between conventional and emerging media to move the discussion of the environment in the direction of real-world solutions and discussion. Its hybrid web/television format focuses on energy, climate and sustainability issues. Sesno completes regular webisodes on the Planet Forward website through his Profile on Planet Forward.

He currently hosts the PBS program "The Future of News."

In 2000, while at CNN, Sesno appeared on the Democracy Now! show.

In 2012, controversy surrounded Sesno's moderation of a debate at The George Washington University between conservative commentator Ann Coulter and MSNBC host Lawrence O'Donnell. Coulter accused Sesno of biased moderating and said he treated her like a 'crazy broad' after he repeatedly responded to her points rather than allow O'Donnell to respond.

In 2016, Sesno appeared as a news anchor on House of Cards in the eighth episode of the fourth season titled "Chapter 48."

In 2017, Sesno published Ask More: The Power of Questions to Open Doors, Uncover Solutions, and Spark Change with a foreword by Wolf Blitzer. Ask More focuses on how successful individuals formulate and ask the "right" questions.

In 2019, the School of Media and Public Affairs announced that Director Frank Sesno would step down after an 11-year tenure as the school's head at the end of 2019–2020 academic year.

In 2020, Frank Sesno announced he will serve as the School of Media and Public Affairs director of strategic initiatives following a sabbatical.

== Notable works ==
In 2006, a highly rated Sesno documentary about the politics of energy appeared on CNN. His last program titled, "We Were Warned: Tomorrow's Oil Crisis," aired on CNN. He teaches how the media affects the creation of public policy and is a host and producer of in-depth specials and mini-series on PBS and The History Channel.

- 1992, Co-Anchor, The World Today (CNN)
- 2002, Appearance, Who Counts? (PBS)
- 2002, Producer, Ronald Reagan: A Legacy Remembered (The History Channel)
- 2003, Moderator, Avoiding Armageddon (CNN)
  - Confronting Terrorism: Turning the Tide (episode)
  - Nuclear Nightmares: Losing Control (episode)
  - Silent Killers: Poisons and Plagues (episode)
  - The New Face of Terror: Upping the Ante (episode)
- 2003, Narrator, LBJ vs. the Kennedys: Chasing Demons
- 2003, Narrator, JFK: A Presidency Revealed
- 2003, Moderator, Controversy: The Reagans
- 2004, Writer, Sesno Reports (WETA-PBS)
- The Situation Room with Wolf Blitzer, Regular Contributor (CNN)
- Fueling the Future, series, PBS
- 2007, We Were Warned: Tomorrow's Oil Crisis (CNN)
- 2008, Appearance, Pritzker Military Library Presents: Front & Center with John Callaway, The Politics of Defense
- 2009, Planet Forward, Pilot and Web-Sequel

== Awards ==
- Emmy award, for his coverage of the 1993 Midwest flooding, "In Nature's Wake".
- CableAce Award, for coverage of the superpower summits
- Overseas Press Club Award, for best spot news reporting from abroad
- The National Press Club Award, for best consumer reporting on the breakup of the Bell system
- Lincoln University's Unity Award, for his 1992 documentary on economic dislocation in the United States.
