= Hadas Gold =

American journalist

- הדס גולד
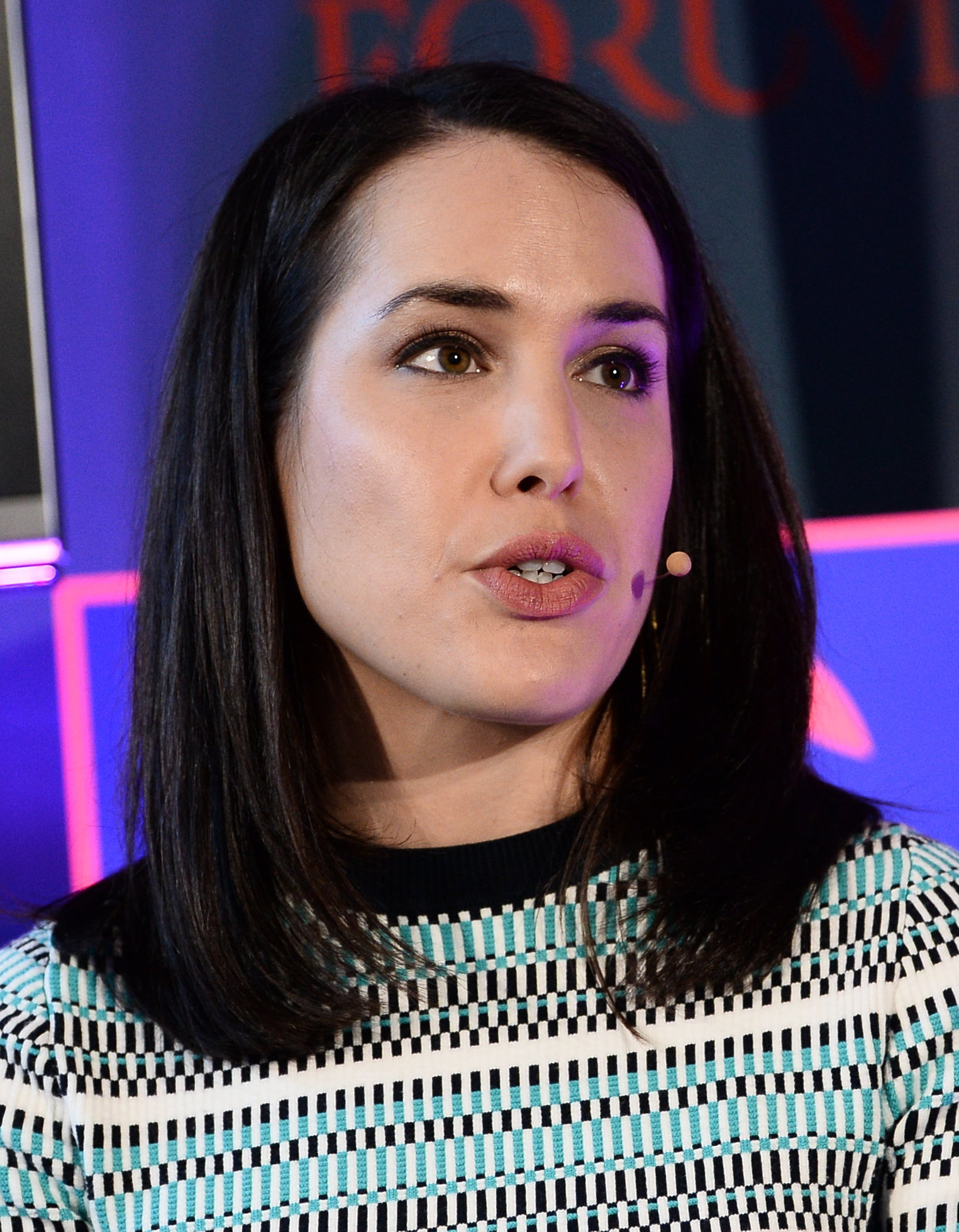
- Gold at Web Summit 2017
- Born: February 25, 1988 (age 38); Tel Aviv, Israel
- Education: George Washington University (BA, MA)
- Occupation: Journalist
- Spouse: Christopher Alex Hooton

Hadas Gold (Hebrew: הדס גולד; born February 25, 1988) is a correspondent for CNN and CNN International covering AI and technology.

== Early life ==
Gold was born in Tel Aviv, Israel, the daughter of Daphna and Yoram Gold. Her father is an Israel Defense Forces veteran and project manager for a drug company; her mother is a Hebrew teacher. Her family is Jewish. She moved to Scottsdale, Arizona when she was three and graduated in 2006 from Desert Mountain High School. She graduated with a B.A. in journalism and a M.A. in media and public affairs from George Washington University. During school, she worked as a news and feature editor at The GW Hatchet where she received awards from the Society for Professional Journalists and the Associated College Press. In 2011, she was awarded a prestigious fellowship from the Pulitzer Center.

== Career ==
Gold interned at 60 Minutes, Politifact, and with Cox Newspapers before working as a freelance producer with Colombian TV network NTN 24 and then at Politico as a media reporter where she led the "On The Media" blog and covered the 2016 presidential campaign. She left Politico after five years to work for CNN as their politics, media and global business reporter. In 2017, Gold was named one of the "most influential media reporters" by Mediaite. She currently sits on the National Council for the George Washington University School of Media and Public Affairs.

In October 2016, Gold was targeted with antisemitic threats, tweets and emails, including threats against her life. Other prominent Jewish journalists also received similar threats at the time, including Jake Tapper of CNN; Jeffrey Goldberg; editor-in-chief of The Atlantic, Jonathan Weisman of the New York Times; and Ben Shapiro of The Daily Wire. Gold's employer at the time Politico, reported the threats to police. Gold states that: "I don't want to say it's something you just have to deal with, but the internet is both wonderful and not wonderful. You have to kind of take the good with the bad and react appropriately when it does seem serious."

On May 27, 2018, Gold retweeted an Arizona Republic article of migrant children being held at an ICE detention facility, including photos of them in cages. The article was first tweeted by numerous other journalists and public figures following President Donald Trump's new policy of taking children away from parents who are caught unlawfully crossing the Mexican border into the United States including New York Times Magazine editor-in-chief Jake Silverstein, Shaun King, Obama speechwriter Jon Favreau, activist Linda Sarsour, and former Los Angeles mayor Antonio Villaraigosa. Gold subsequently deleted her tweet writing "Deleted previous tweet because gave impression of recent photos (they're from 2014)" after it emerged that the article was from 2014 during the administration of President Barack Obama.

Gold became a correspondent for CNN in 2017, eventually moving to London for the network. In 2021 she became the network's Jerusalem correspondent. She was the first correspondent at CNN to cover the October 7, 2023, Hamas attacks and ensuing war reporting under live rocket fire, for which she and the CNN team were awarded an Emmy Award for Breaking News Coverage as well as an Overseas Press Club award.

== Personal life ==
In 2017, Gold married economist Christopher Alex Hooton in Scottsdale.
