= GW-TV =

- Washington, D.C.; United States

Programming
- Affiliations: George Washington University's School of Media and Public Affairs (SMPA)

Ownership
- Owner: George Washington University

History
- Founded: 2003

Links
- Website: Official website

GW-TV is the student television station at George Washington University in Washington, DC. It began on gw-tv.com in fall 2003, and was later launched in April 2004 on channel 6 on closed-circuit television on the university's cable system. Later it moved to channel 61 when the university changed cable providers and currently is online only. It was created by then-student Brian Weiss.

GW-TV shows are primarily posted on Youtube, though the shows often post news clips and sketches on social media.

Many of the station's programs are recorded in the GW Media and Public Affairs building's television studio.

GW-TV provides students with the opportunity to shoot, write, and edit their own packages. Students also have the chance to produce their own shows, work behind the scenes in the control room, and appear on camera.

== Shows ==
GW-TV produces a variety of original programming, with topics ranging from campus events to national news and entertainment to politics. The channel is also home to The Source, a news show produced by GW students in SMPA classes.

GW-TV programs include:

- Capital Crossfire - GW-TV's version of Sunday talk, Capital Crossfire covers the national and international political beat. The episodes center around a debate between two students (one from the right and one from the left) moderated by the show's host. The show often features interviews with a journalist, government official, or professor who speaks in depth on more complex or under-discussed news topics.
- GWeek - A newsmagazine style show, GWeek covers the campus and Washington, D.C. news.
- Unstoppable - GW-TV's sports program. Each episode includes five main components: an overview of the news and updates from each ongoing varsity sport, analysis of select sports from the show's anchors, more in-depth packages on select sports (usually highlighting key athletes or events), a lengthier interview with a GW coach or athlete (usually conducted in-studio), and a preview of upcoming varsity sporting events.
- District Debrief - GW-TV's sketch comedy show. Debrief is made up of writers, cast members, and video editors; producing comedic sketches and satirical headlines.

Previous programming includes: Gender Neutral, F.E.M. (Fashion. Entertainment. Music.), DC2LA, Select Seven, Backstage GW, Interns, Upfront, The Making of Rocky Horror, InFocus, MelindAerobics, Wanna Come Over?, and GW-TV's flagship show, GWeekly.

== Awards ==
In 2013, GW-TV's original sitcom, Gender Neutral, received an Emmy Award for Writing in a Student Production. The Emmy was awarded by the National Capital and Chesapeake Bay chapter of the Academy of Television Arts and Sciences.
