= Magic Link =

Personal digital assistant

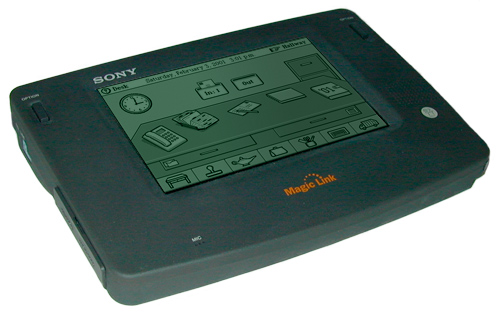
- The Sony Magic Link PIC-1000
- Manufacturer: Sony
- Type: Personal Intelligent Communicator
- Lifespan: 1994-
- Operating system: Magic Cap
- CPU: MC68349 16 MHz Motorola Dragon I
- Memory: 1MB Random Access Memory and PC Card
- Display: 480 x 320 pixel LCD
- Input: Touchscreen (stylus-based)
- Connectivity: 2400 bit/s modem
- Power: 6 AAA alkaline batteries or AC power or Sony camcorder Li ion rechargeable pack

The Magic Link was a Personal Intelligent Communicator marketed by Sony from 1994, based on General Magic's Magic Cap operating system. The Magic Link PIC-1000 was brought to market by Jerry Fiala Sr at Sony. The "Link" part of the name refers to the device's ability to send and receive data over a modem.

A competing product to the Magic Link was the Motorola Envoy. In 1995, the Magic Link won the PC World World Class Award. Magic Link PIC-2000 was released in 1996.

== Applications ==
- Messages
- Address Book
- Clock and Calendar
- Notebook
- Spreadsheet
- Datebook
- Phone
- Fax machine (Kobes Japan model only)
- Pocket Quicken
- Sony AV Remote Commander
- Calculator
- AT&T PersonaLink Services
- America Online mail client

== Documentary film ==
The device features prominently in the documentary film General Magic about the epic rise and fall of General Magic.
