= Planet Forward =

Online public forum

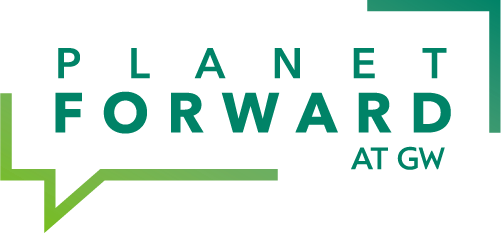
- Creator: Frank Sesno
- Founder: Frank Sesno
- Website: http://www.planetforward.org/
- Launched: 2009

Planet Forward, a project of The George Washington University's School of Media and Public Affairs, is an online public forum where experts, citizens and students weigh in on energy, climate, and sustainability. The most inventive and creative ideas are featured online.

== Background ==
=== About ===
Planet Forward is inspired by the combined power of user-generated media and the tools of journalism to discover innovations. This initiative challenges the conventional top-down format of traditional media and rewards contributors who are working to solve these problems by exposing them to the public and create competition to find ideas to move the planet forward.

Planet Forward is an initiative that compiles ideas and innovations on sustainability from scientists, business leaders, advocates, students, and government officials. It engages with university students and faculty globally and collaborates with various organizations to publish these ideas.

=== Operation ===
On the Planet Forward website, members can submit videos or written descriptions of their solutions to combat energy challenges.

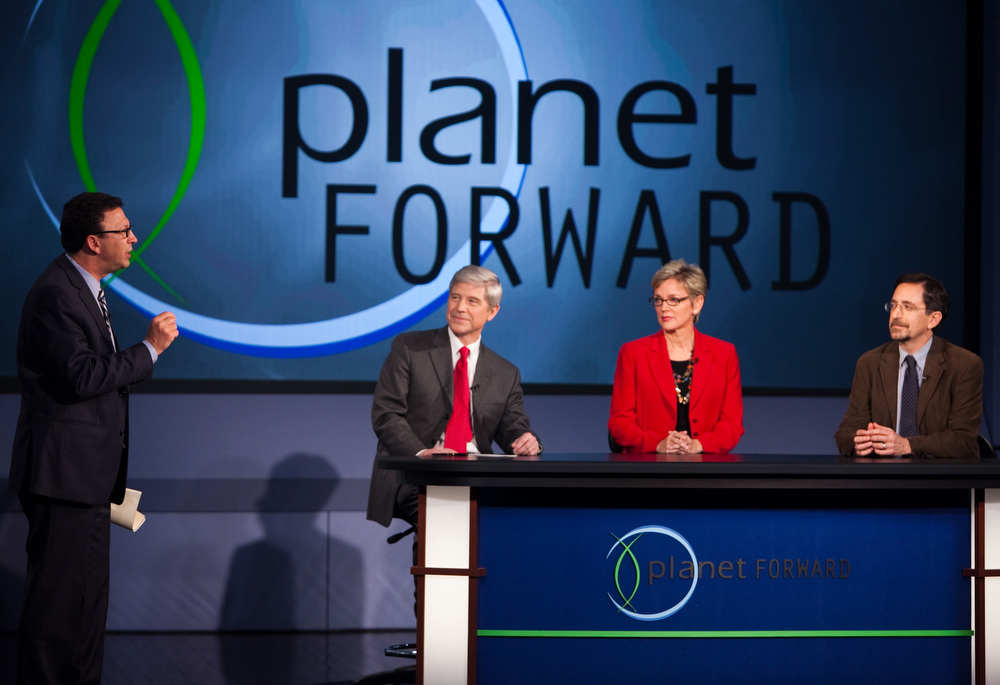
Frank Sesno talks to guests Thomas Connelly, Jr., executive vice president and chief innovation officer for DuPont, Jennifer Granholm, former governor of Michigan, and Andrew Revkin.

Members can comment, discuss and share ideas with other Planet Forward members as well as "like" (i.e. vote for) their favorite innovations. Experts in clean energy and climate then look at the ideas and evaluate them on terms of viability, impact and technical merit.

=== History ===
Created and hosted by Frank Sesno, Planet Forward launched its website in March 2009 and appeared on PBS on April 15, 2009.

In December 2009, Planet Forward began producing weekly, online webisodes showcasing some of the best innovative solutions from Planet Forward members across the country. Each webisode was centered around a specific energy or environment-related topic, ranging from hybrid vehicles to smart grids.

In October 2010, Planet Forward began producing monthly segments for PBS's Nightly Business Report. Like the webisodes, the Nightly Business Report segments focused on a particular green topic and featured ideas submitted by Planet Forward site members. Planet Forward aired its second PBS special, The Energy of Innovation, on April 8, 2011.

2011 marked Planet Forward's continued breakout into the public sphere. Teaming up with universities and big-name environmental contributors like the United States Department of Agriculture and National Geographic, the project generated a strong following—online and in the environmental community.

On April 17, 2012, Planet Forward and The George Washington University's Office of Sustainably hosted a "Turning Innovation into Action" symposium. Thought-leaders from government, industry and academics joined to highlight solutions to the challenges of a changing planet. The half-day conference highlighted "Innovation Challenges" offered by participants to demonstrate their commitment moving the planet forward. Panelists included Former Chief Technology Officer of the United States, Aneesh Chopra, then-Mayor of the District of Columbia, Vincent C. Gray and Vice President of GE Ecomagination, Mark Vachon.

In 2013, Planet Forward narrowed their focus toward food, more specifically, toward the effort to feed a growing world population. The initiative set out to identify, celebrate and connect innovators within the sustainable food production community. It kicked off with the project's inaugural Feeding the Planet summit where CEOs, farmers, college students and policy makers met to discuss challenges and opportunities in the sustainable food sector. The event engaged over 400 attendees, over 1,000 online participants and several students from over ten colleges and universities. It also generated 24 million Twitter impressions and over 3,000 tweets by using #FoodFWD. Throughout the year, Planet Forward hosted salons and webinars, placing themselves firmly within the sustainability world.

Aside from 2014, Planet Forward has hosted a summit each year since the inaugural year. Students, sustainability professionals, and leaders come to the summit to discuss sustainability, storytelling, and solutions over the two-day summit hosted at George Washington University.

Planet Forward founder Frank Sesno and director Dan Reed teach an undergraduate sustainability reporting class at GW University's School of Media and Public Affairs to help student reporters build environmental journalism knowledge and skills.

In July 2013, Planet Forward implemented the "Planet Forward Explorers" program. Explorers traveled with professor Imani Cheers to Kenya and Tanzania in order to study agricultural technology. Four of their videos were featured in the project's weekly segment on Bloomberg Television's, Bloomberg West, a program in which Planet Forward founder Frank Sesno presented ideas about moving toward a more sustainable planet. In the spring of 2014, students traveled to Guatemala in order to research child nutrition. The team presented their work during the Latin American & Hemispheric Studies Capstone Symposium at the George Washington University's Elliott School of International Affairs. All of the Explorers created videos on their findings which were featured on Planet Forward's website as well as the second Feeding the Planet Summit in 2015.

In the spring of 2014, the project launched the Planet Forward University Consortium, a program that allowed other universities from across the country to join the conversation to help address sustainability challenges through storytelling. Middlebury College, Roger Williams University, the University of Arizona and the University of California, Berkeley are some of the current participants.

Planet Forward carried their keystone initiative, Feeding the Planet, through the next two years, hosting another summit in the spring of 2015 called "Feeding the Planet Summit: The Story of Food in the Age of Climate Change."

Beginning in 2015, Planet Forward began holding an annual contest called Storyfest. Students can submit up to three stories (videos, photograph projects, written stories, audio projects, etc.) for consideration. The grand prize is a sustainability reporting trip to a destination like the Amazon (2017), Alaska (2018), the Galapagos Islands (2019), and Iceland (2020). Planet Forward also takes several students on a trip to Rome each October to attend the United Nations Food and Agriculture Organization's Committee on World Food Security.

=== Social media ===
Planet Forward has a well-founded social media campaign, with active Twitter and Facebook accounts which are updated daily. As of June 2015, Planet Forward had over 13,900 Twitter followers and 6,620 Facebook fans.

== Seasons ==
=== Season 1: Energy Future ===
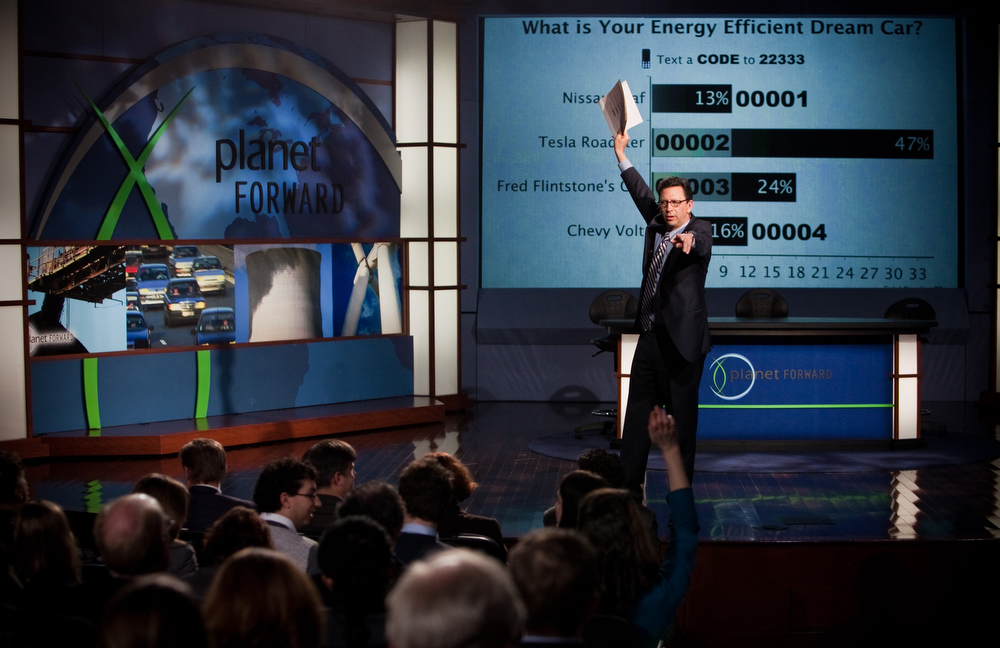
Frank Sesno interacts with the audience during the 2011 PBS special.

Hosted by creator Frank Sesno, the original pilot television special featured a panel style discussion that addressed the question: can we move rapidly away from fossil fuels in the near future?. The panelists for the pilot were James L. Connaughton, Hunter Lovins, and Shai Agassi. Viewers were encouraged to visit the website to submit their ideas about fossil fuels to the panel of experts. Those who submitted the most engaging and thought provoking ideas were selected to appear before Carol Browner, the senior advisory to President Barack Obama on Energy and Climate Change.

=== Season 2: Carbon Footprint ===
Since the pilot phase of the project, Planet Forward relaunched its website, began producing a series of weekly webisodes and began producing monthly special segments for the PBS business series Nightly Business Report. Planet Forward also archived the content from their first season. In the spring 2010 they addressed the question, "How Can We Reduce Our Carbon Footprint?" The ideas generated in response to the question were featured on a web-only special taped on April 16, 2010, featuring EPA Director Lisa P. Jackson.

=== Season 3: Energy Innovations ===
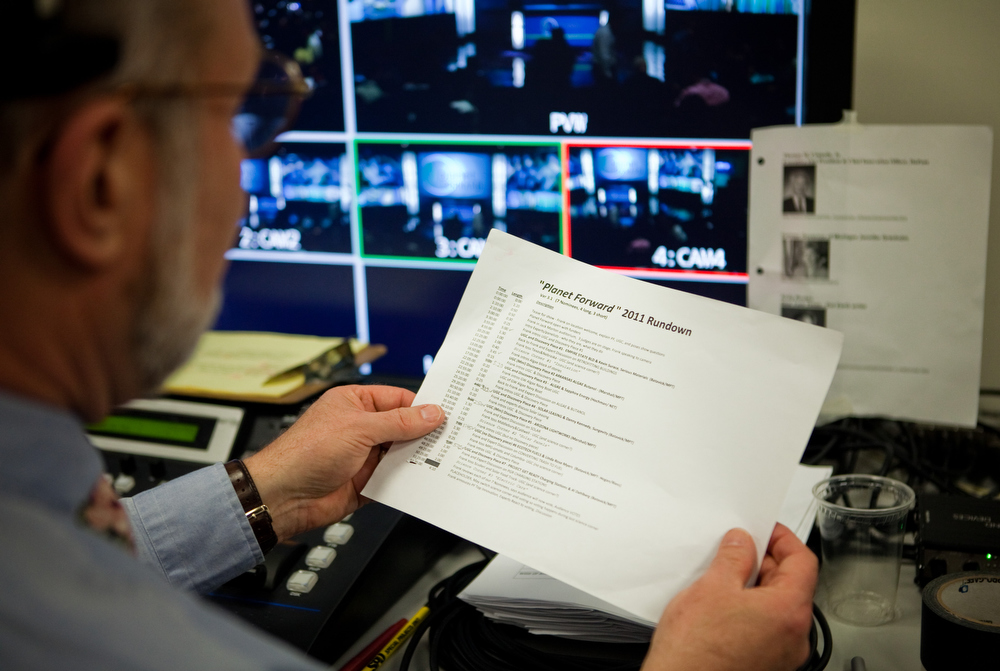
The 2011 PBS special's rundown.

In the summer of 2010, Planet Forward launched a new question: "What is an innovation that improves how we generate or use energy?" On April 8, 2011 Planet Forward aired its second PBS special, showcasing the best innovator's answers. Danny Kennedy and Jamie Hestekin were selected as the show's winners (i.e. Planet Forward's Innovators of the Year) and Planet Forward will be following in their innovative endeavors for a year.

Planet Forward also entered into a partnership with National Geographic's Great Energy Challenge to produce and manage a blog hosted on the National Geographic website.

=== Season 4: Changing Planet ===
In 2011, Planet Forward teamed up with the National Science Foundation, Discover Magazine and NBC News to produce "Changing Planet," a series of town hall meetings on climate change across the country. Planet Forward members could submit their energy innovation ideas online to business leaders, politicians, journalists and experts in the climate and energy industry at a live town hall meeting at The George Washington University's Jack Morton Auditorium for a chance to be featured on The Weather Channel.

=== Season 5: Smart Communities ===
In the fall of 2011, Planet Forward asked its members to share their ideas about creating smart, green-minded communities by posing the question: "What innovation can help communities build for the future and adapt to a changing planet?" The best ideas have been featured in webisodes and Nightly Business Report segments.

In March 2012, Planet Forward began producing segments for Bloomberg Television's "Bloomberg West" TV show.

== Featured research ==
Planet Forward featured projects that have developed new technology in the energy sector, such as using the Earth's geologic hear to produce energy in El Salvador, innovations for absorbing carbon dioxide from urban areas, the works of John Obik and Matthew Mitchel Urquhart in Project Home 2011 scientific research which utilizes quantum energy for electrostatic maglev devices, research into using air as fuel, and research for using bacteria as a possible alternative source of energy. Planet Forward airs news broadcasts of these research projects on public television as a program that is actively involved with the community.

== Images ==
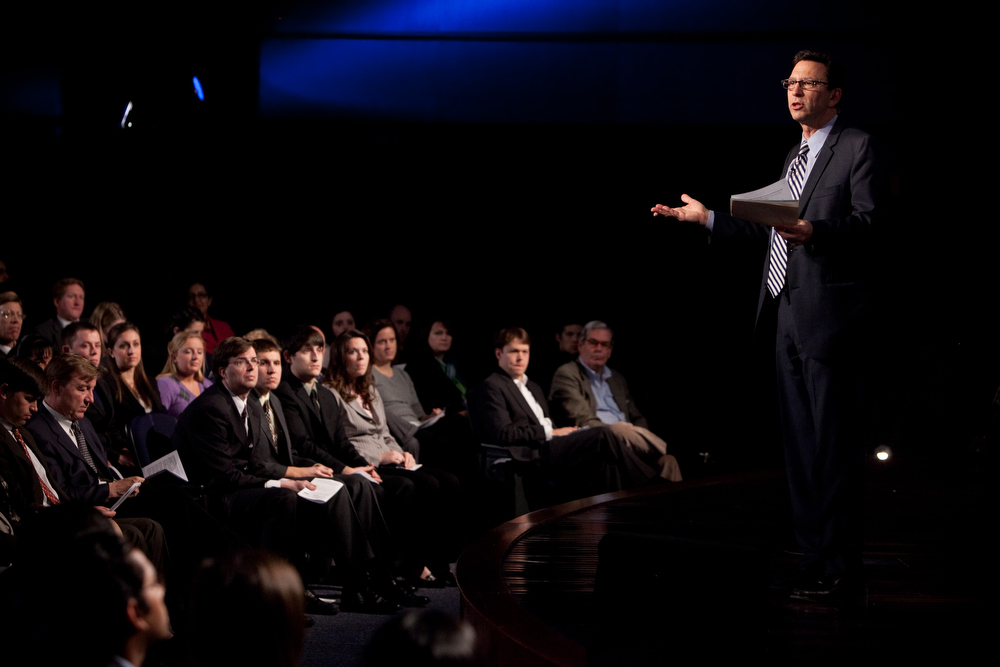
Frank Sesno interacts with the audience.

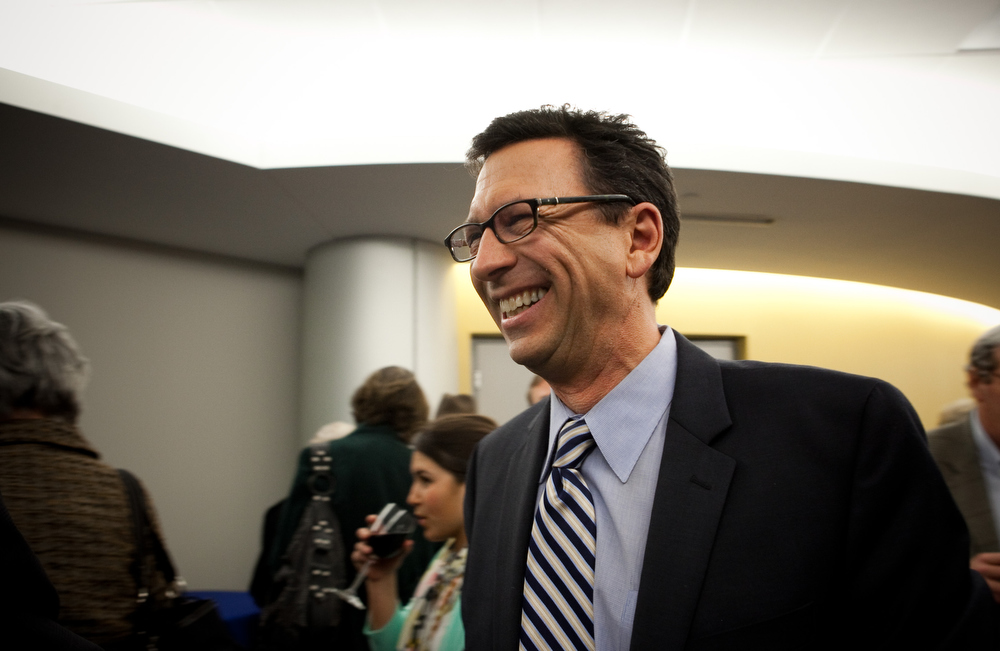
Host Frank Sesno

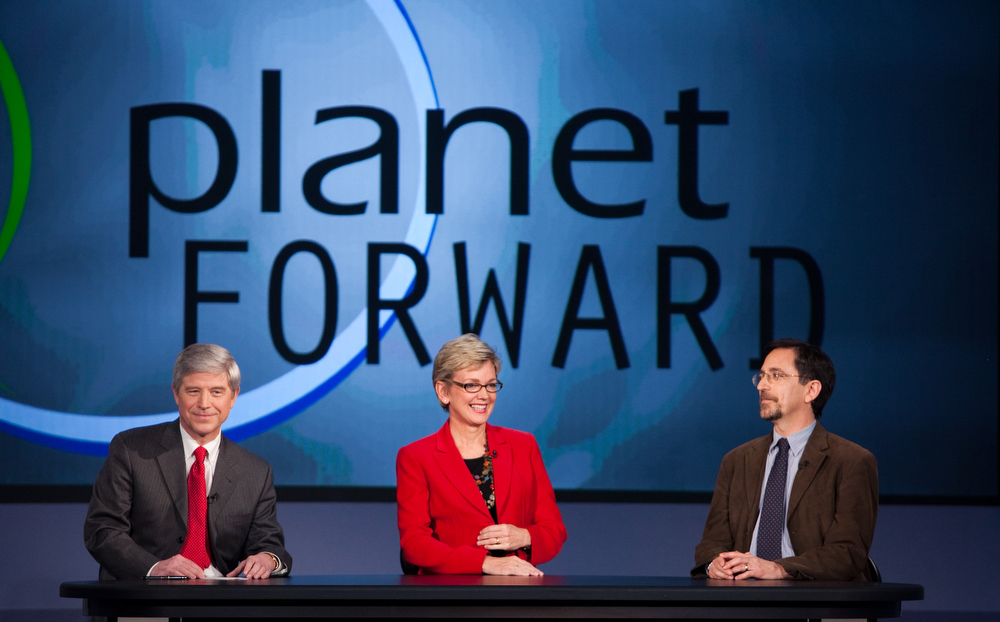
Frank Sesno talks to guests during the 2011 PBS special.

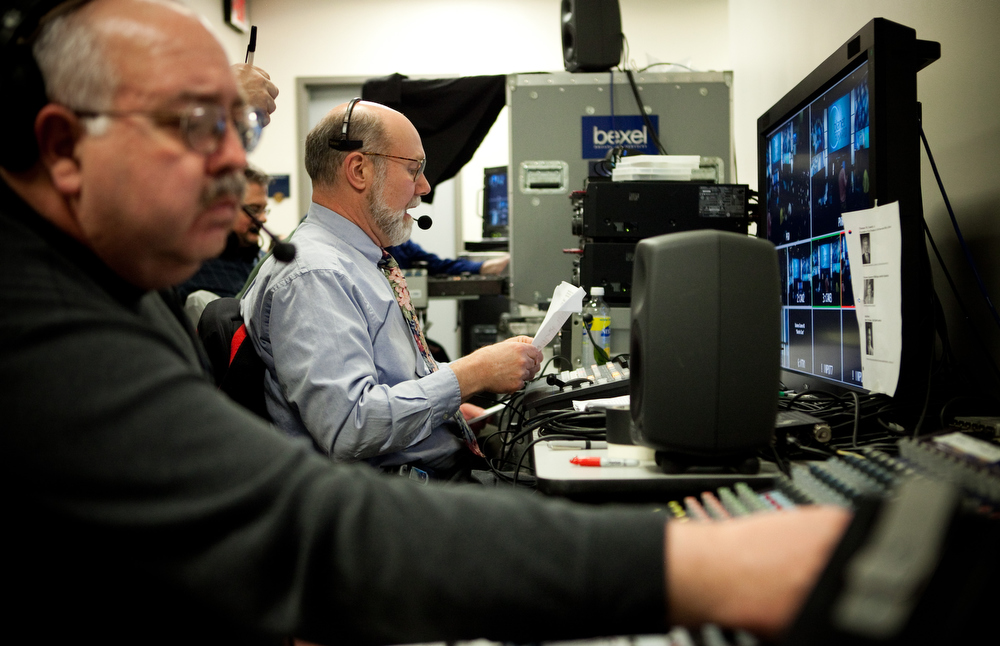
Behind the scenes at the 2011 PBS special.

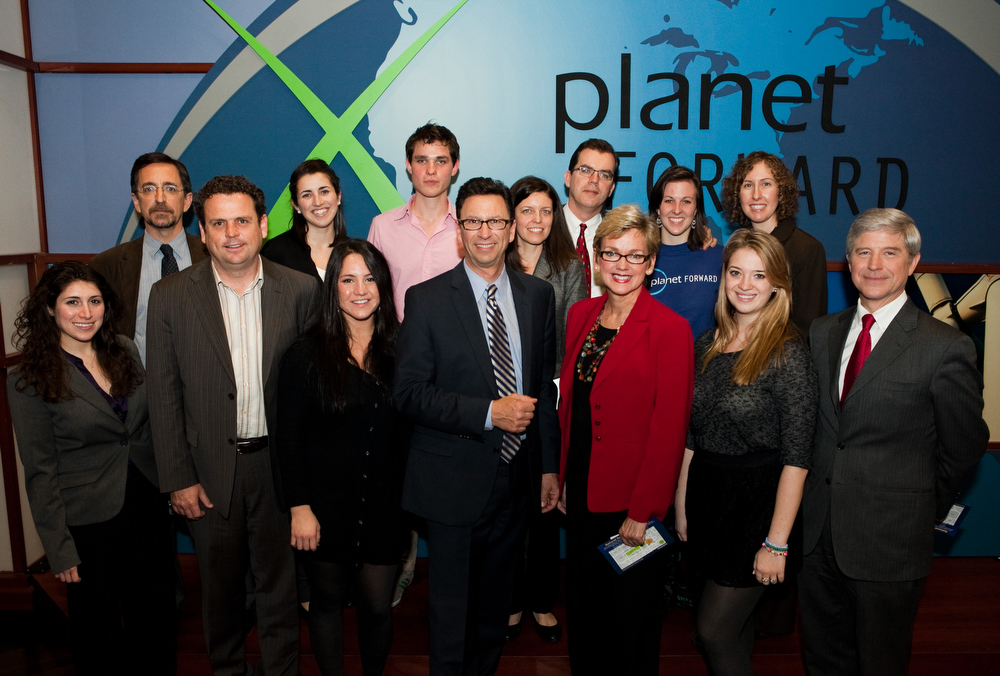
The Planet Forward staff.
