= Kevin Surace =

American businessman

Kevin J. Surace
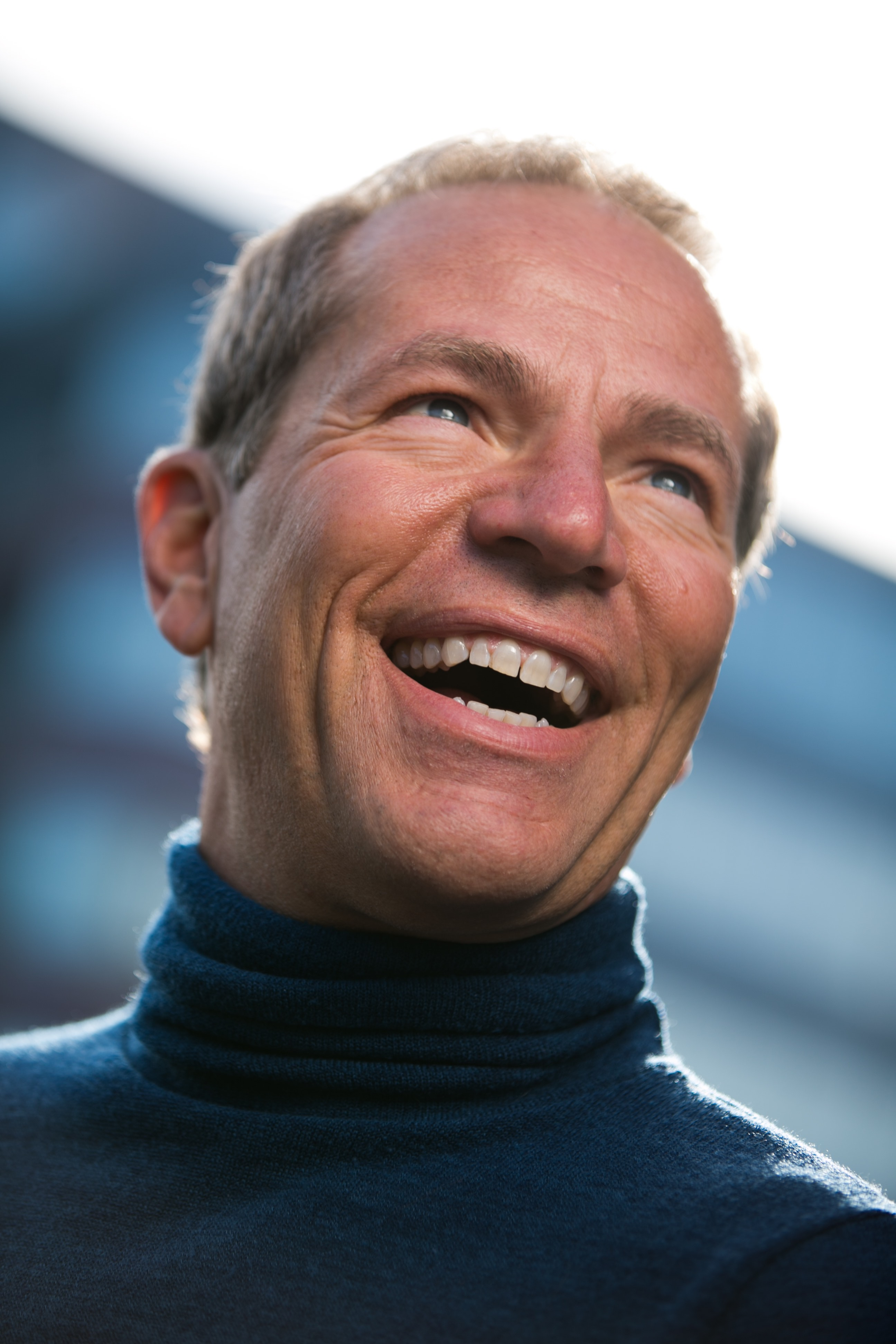
- Surace in 2016
- Born: July 12, 1962 (age 64); United States
- Education: Rochester Institute of Technology
- Occupation: Businessperson
- Website: kevinsurace.com

Kevin Surace (born July 12, 1962) is an American technology innovator, producer and entrepreneur. He is the CTO of Appvance, creator of a Generative AI software QA platform. He was Inc. Magazine’s 2009 entrepreneur of the Year. He is the inventor of QuietRock Soundproof Drywall.

Planet Forward, CNBC and the World Economic Forum have recognized Surace as an innovator and a technology pioneer. He has 93 patents worldwide. Surace is a speaker on AI, Generative AI, robotics, automation and the future of work.

== Education and personal life ==
Surace earned a B.S. in electrical engineering technology from the Rochester Institute of Technology. He serves on the RIT Board of Trustees, was alumni of the year in 2011, outstanding alumnus in 2019 and was inducted into the school’s Innovation Hall of Fame.

His wife Marita Surace died on February 5, 2012. He married Erica Rogers on January 1, 2014. She is the CEO of Silk Road Medical.

== Career ==
Surace was the executive vice president of products and network services at General Magic, leading the development of the first large scale artificially intelligent voice user interface, and the team that developed the OnStar Virtual Advisor for General Motors." He also served as the chairman, CEO and president of WebKnight, Inc. (sold to Micrografx). He became the CEO then CTO of Appvance, the developer of an AI native quality platform for automated software testing and Chairman of cybersecurity company Token. Surace also held engineering and management positions at National Semiconductor, IBM and Seiko Epson.

Surace co-founded Serious Energy, a cleantech company that uses disruptive technologies to reduce energy usage in buildings. Serious Energy’s product EcoRock (an eco-friendly drywall) earned a Best New Product award from Popular Science magazine and was named the most innovative environmental product of the year by the Wall Street Journal.

Surace launched the cloud-based procurement platform Perfect Commerce and serviced as its chairman, CEO, and president. In 1992, Surace also co-founded Air Communications Inc., and became the company’s CEO and president. In 2010, he led Serious to replace all windows in the Empire State Building to reduce energy consumption.

Surace is the CTO of Appvance, creator of an AI driven QA platform. He has served on boards for RIT, Zeta Design/Build, WaterCity, Coyuchi, Spot Trender and TweetSecret.

Surace holds several patents in green technologies, and has authored articles on energy efficiency and the green economy. In 2009, he delivered a TED talk on his patented eco-friendly drywall and the need to rethink basic materials in a sustainable light. He is quoted as saying, "[It takes the equivalent of] eight thousand gallons of gas to build one house. … It’s like driving around the world six times. We must change everything." He delivered an earlier TED talk on Worst Case Climate Change.

== Recognition ==
In 2009, Surace was Inc. Magazine entrepreneur of the Year. In 2010, CNBC, one of 15 Leading Innovators for the next decade. In 2010, the World Economic Forum, Tech Pioneer.

In 2010 he was the keynote speaker for the Democratic Caucus (House of Representatives). In 2011, Planet Forward nominated Surace as an Innovator of the Year.
