= Remote evaluation =

In computer science, remote evaluation is a general term for any technology that involves transmitting executable software code from a client computer to a server computer for subsequent executing at the server. After the code has finished executing, the results of its execution are sent back to the client.

Remote evaluation belongs to the family of mobile code, within the field of code mobility. An example for remote evaluation is grid computing: An executable task may be sent to a specific computer in the grid. After the execution has terminated, the result is sent back to the client. The client in turn may have to reassemble the different results of multiple concurrently calculated subtasks into one single result.

== See also ==
- Client-side scripting, the client executing code sent by the server, instead of the server executing code sent by the client
- Code on demand
- Code mobility
