= George Washington University School of Media and Public Affairs =

Public policy school of George Washington University

Coordinates: 38.8998°N 77.0462°W

- Motto: Deus Nobis Fiducia (In God Our Trust)
- Type: Private
- Established: 1938
- Parent institution: Columbian College of Arts and Sciences
- Faculty: 55
- Location: Washington, D.C.
- Campus: Urban—Foggy Bottom
- Website: smpa.gwu.edu

The School of Media and Public Affairs (SMPA) at the George Washington University in Washington, DC, a school in the Columbian College of Arts and Sciences, offers both undergraduate and graduate programs in journalism and political and international communication. The school's director is Frank Sesno, former CNN correspondent, creator of PBS's Planet Forward, and professor.

== History ==
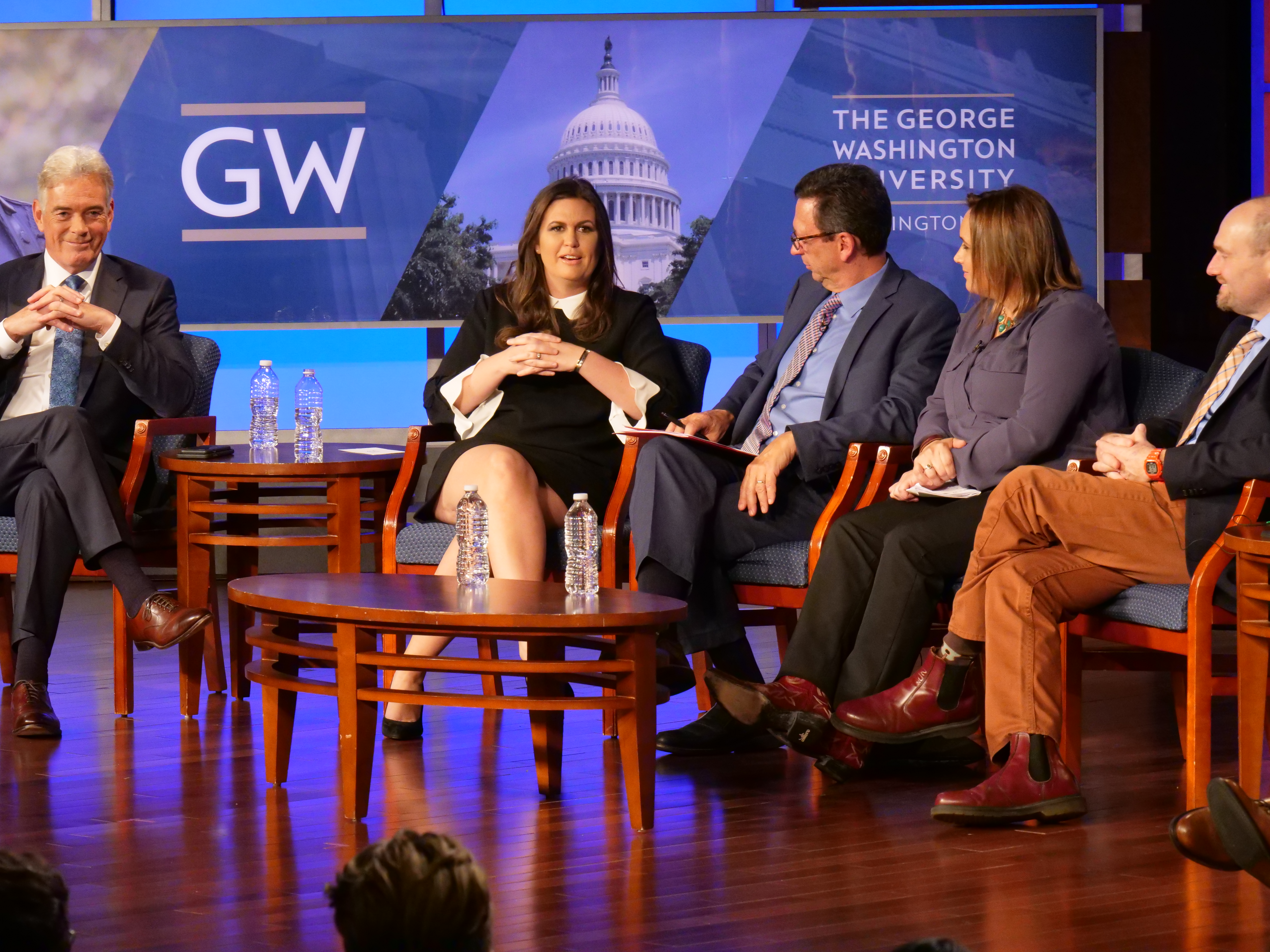
"Trump's First Year", an event held with White House press secretary Sarah Huckabee Sanders, the chief White House correspondents from The New York Times, CNN, Fox News, and the president of the White House Correspondents' Association; hosted by the SMPA in 2017

The university began offering journalism courses in 1938. In 1980, it issued its first degree in radio/television, and in 1982 became the first university in the world to offer an undergraduate degree in political communication.

In 1991, the National Center for Communication Studies was founded within Columbian College. The NCCS offered programs in journalism, political communication, radio/television and speech communication.

The center was renamed and transformed into the School of Media and Public Affairs in 1996, at the request of faculty who thought the new name better reflected the center's focus on teaching. At this time, the center's speech communication offerings became part of the Department of Organizational Sciences and Communication, while the new school continued to offer undergraduate degrees in journalism, political communication and radio/television within the Columbian College of Arts and Sciences. In 1997, the radio/television program became the now-defunct Electronic Media program.

SMPA began offering graduate degree programs in 1998 with the creation of the Master's in Media and Public Affairs program. It has since expanded its graduate program offerings to include a master's degree in global communication. In 2014, the original degree was renamed the Master's in Media and Strategic Communication.

In 2001, the university dedicated the new School of Media and Public Affairs building at the corner of 21st and H streets after nearly two years of construction. The building included state-of-the-art facilities, including a TV studio, editing rooms and audio suites for the Electronic Media program and the 260-seat, soundproof Jack Morton Auditorium.

== Facilities ==
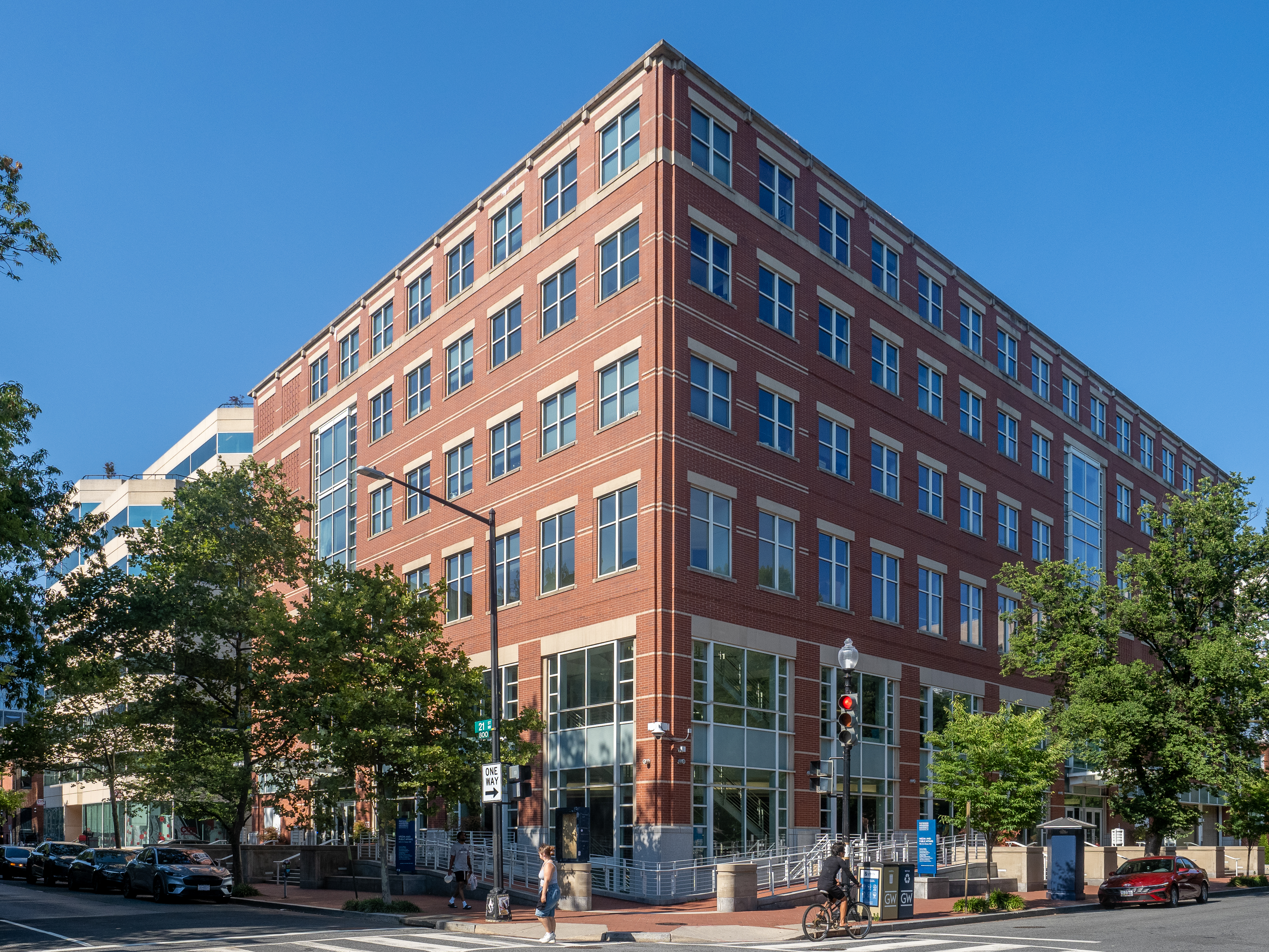
The SMPA is located between University Yard and the Marvin Center.

The School of Media and Public Affairs is housed in the Media and Public Affairs building at 805 21st St, NW, which additionally houses the Graduate School of Political Management and the Trachtenberg School of Public Policy and Public Administration (SPPPA). The Jack Morton Auditorium is on the first floor of the building. The Jack Morton Auditorium was the filming location for CNN's Crossfire debate show between 2002 and 2005. It has also hosted speakers including Barack Obama, Joe Biden, Hillary Clinton, Janet Napolitano, Jon Huntsman Jr., Chuck Todd, Cory Booker, Christine Lagarde, and Eric Cantor. Since 2016, the auditorium has been a frequent site for CNN Town Halls, featuring such guests as Bernie Sanders, Paul Ryan, John McCain, and Lindsey Graham. In addition, the location usually hosts the annual "Only at GW" debate cosponsored by the university's College Democrats, College Republicans, and Program Board, which invites high-profile liberal and conservative personalities.

The Richard Eaton Broadcast Studio includes four cameras, teleprompters, news and interview sets, a greenscreen and a professional control room. GW-TV, the university's student-run television station, broadcasts from the studio.

SMPA students have 24/7 access to the building's suite of editing facilities, which include Adobe Creative Cloud video editing software, and students in video production classes have the ability to check out professional video and audio recording equipment.

== Administration ==
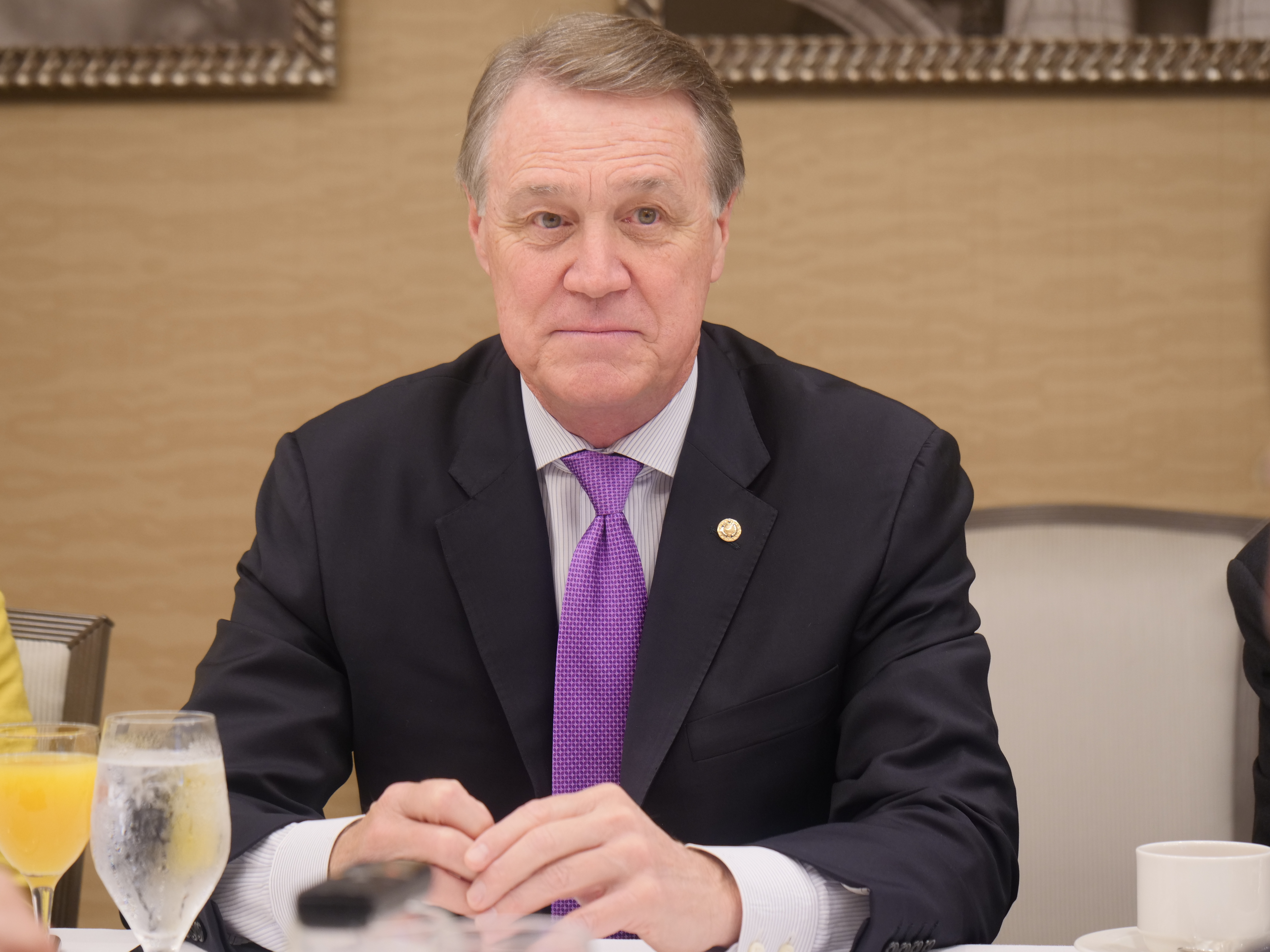
U.S. Senator David Perdue speaking at the SMPA's Defense Writers Group, June 2018

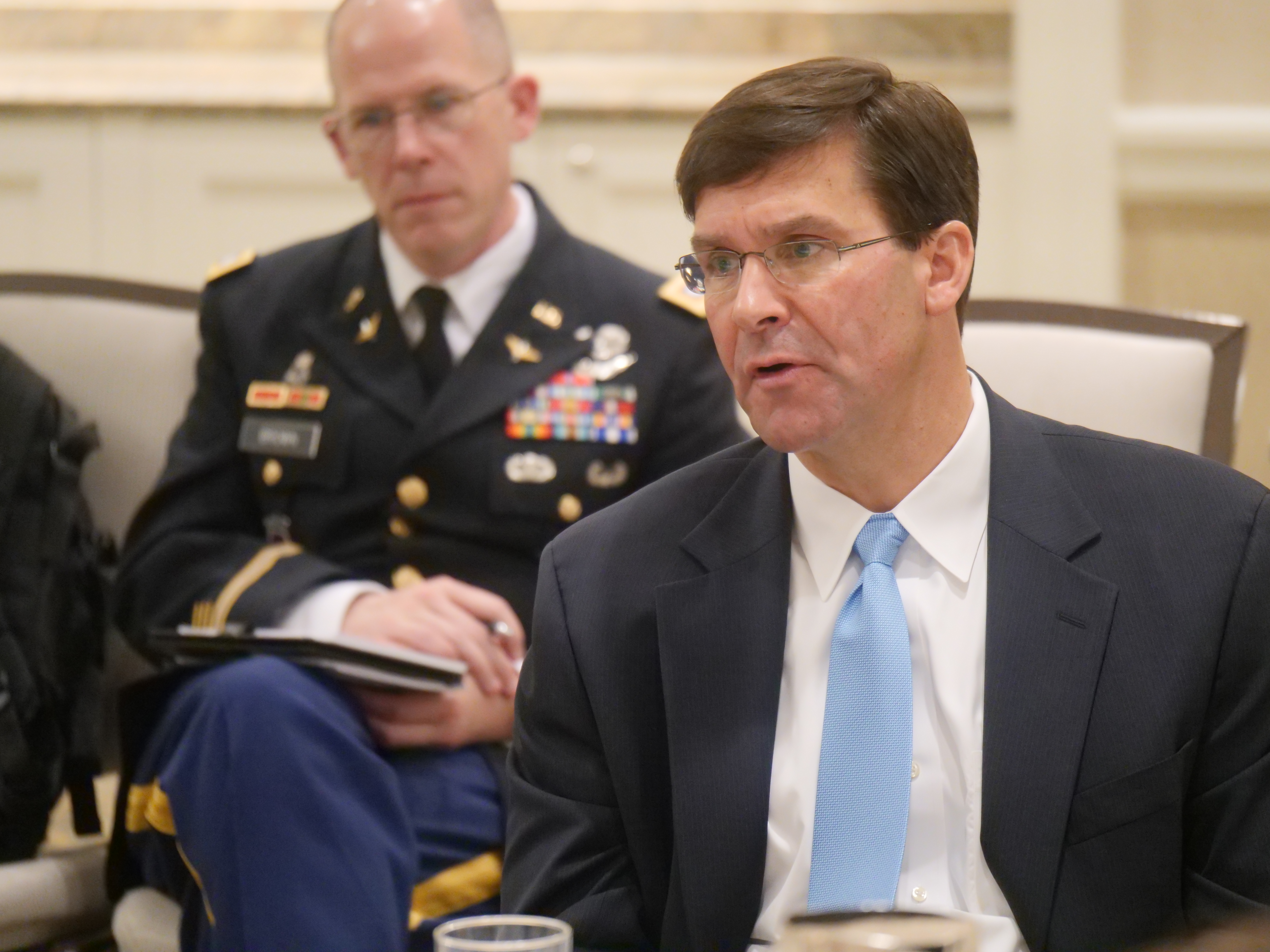
Mark Esper, current Secretary of Defense, speaking at the SMPA's Defense Writers Group, August 2018

Frank Sesno served as the Director of the SMPA from 2009 until 2020. An Emmy Award and National Press Club Award-winning journalist, as well as a member of the Council on Foreign Relations, Sesno previously served as the chief political correspondent for CNN and created PBS's Planet Forward.

Along with the Elliott School of International Affairs, SMPA administers the Institute for Public Diplomacy and Global Communication, which is housed in its building. Established in 2005, the IPDGC studies such topics as new media, national security, and public diplomacy; U.S. foreign policy priorities; challenges to public diplomacy and strategic communication; and gender issues in security and diplomacy. The IPDGC administers the MA program in Global Communication, hosts a public diplomacy fellow, and runs a blog, TakeFive, which features student and faculty contributors.

Other research-based institutes and centers of SMPA include the American Communities Project, The Documentary Center, the Media and Peacebuilding Project, and the Project for Media and National Security.

== Academics ==
=== Undergraduate programs ===
SMPA offers undergraduate majors in journalism and political communication, as well as a five-year BA/MA program with George Washington's Graduate School of Political Management. The school is highly competitive within the university, and offers facilities and opportunities to SMPA students not accessible to other students, such as invitations to attend lectures and taped events filmed within the Jack Morton Auditorium and access to top-of-the-line filming/editing equipment. SMPA was ranked in 2014 as the fifth-best journalism school in the country by USA Today in 2014.

Unlike students in other programs, such as the Elliott School of International Affairs, SMPA undergraduates are part of the Columbian College of Arts and Sciences (CCAS). They have the same core curricular requirements as liberal arts majors and use CCAS's registration and advising services. Undergraduates can either apply directly to their chosen major as a freshman or transfer in during their sophomore year. Dual-degree program candidates apply during their junior year.

=== Graduate programs ===
The School of Media and Public Affairs offers a Master of Arts degree and a joint MA degree in conjunction with the Elliott School of International Affairs. With the SMPA Documentary Center, the school offers a Certificate in Documentary Filmmaking.

== Notable alumni ==
Many of the school's former students have gone on to distinguished careers in journalism and media. Some notable alumni include

- Dana Bash (Chief Political Correspondent and anchor for CNN)
- Mosheh Oinounou (executive producer of CBS Evening News)
- Howard Opinsky (national press secretary for U.S. Senator John McCain)
- Hadas Gold (reporter for CNN International)
- Stephen Krupin (director of speechwriting for President Obama's re-election campaign, chief speechwriter for former Secretary of State John Kerry, chief speechwriter for former Senate Majority Leader Harry Reid)
