= Motorola Envoy =

Personal digital assistant

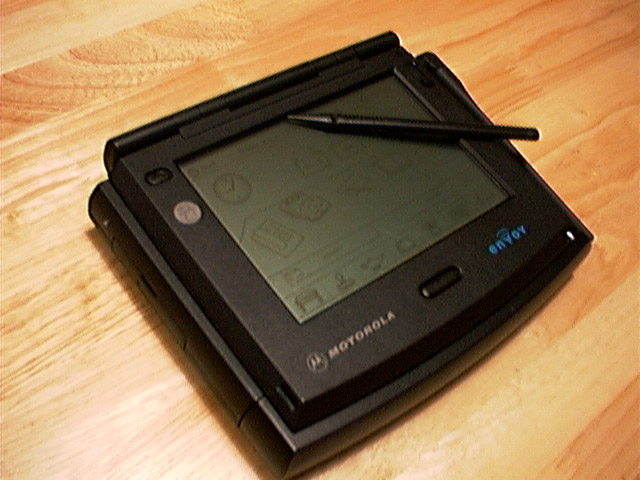
A Motorola Envoy

The Motorola Envoy Personal Wireless Communicator was a personal digital assistant initially slated for release by Motorola in summer 1994 but delayed and then available for public sale in February 1995. It was built to run General Magic's Magic Cap operating system, and it combined wireless, telephone, and infrared modems in a single PDA package. Andy Rubin led development of the Motorola Envoy.

Personal digital assistants (PDAs) were electronic handheld organizers that were used in the 1990s to communicate via email, manage calendars, store contact information, and manage files. Examples of PDAs include the Newton MessagePad released by Apple Inc. in 1993 and the Palm Pilot released by Palm Inc. in 1996. The Motorola Envoy was a particularly notable PDA in view of its built-in wireless communication capability and its well-received user interface, thus referenced by some to be a predecessor of the modern day smartphone.

The hardware of the Motorola Envoy included a Motorola Dragon I/68349 microprocessor, 4 MB of read-only memory (ROM), 1 MB of random access memory (RAM), and an LCD. Of particular interest were the wireless communications capabilities of the Envoy. Its built-in communication components included a radio modem capable of 4,800 bits per second communication, a fax and data modem, and an infrared transceiver capable of 38.4 kbit/s of data transfer. The Envoy also included a PCMCIA interface to expands its communications or other capabilities. The housing had dimensions of 3.5 cm × 17.3 cm × 14.4 cm (1.4 in × 6.8 in × 5.7 in) (height, width, depth) and weighed about 0.77 kg (1.7 lb).

The Motorola Envoy was one of the first PDAs to operate the Magic CAP software, which made extensive use of the built-in wireless communications components of the device. The main screen of Magic CAP displayed a desktop having a phone icon, Rolodex icon, Postcard/writing instrument icon, notebook icon, and calendar book icon, thus simulating real-world productivity tools used by many people. Similarly, a clock, an inbox, an outbox, and a filing cabinet were shown behind the desk, and a control bar provided access to other features of the device. Several of these tools provided simple access to communication features, such as text messaging and addresses, which are widely used by modern smartphones.

The Motorola Envoy provided a convenient way to utilize communication data without a wired connection but, ultimately, the Envoy was held back by its high cost of ownership. The Envoy device had a price tag of about $1500 at launch, and an early-adopter reported a bill for one month of usage of about $400 from the ARDIS network for data communication.

Motorola reused the name for at least one previous product. It is also a UHF tone and vibrate paging receiver produced in the mid-1980s that responded to two-tone sequential encoding, including GE type 99, Quick Call II & 1+1, REACH*, and 5-Tone Sequential.
