= General Magic =

American technology company (1990–2002)

- Industry: Personal digital assistants; Software
- Founded: May 1990
- Founders: Bill Atkinson; Andy Hertzfeld; Marc Porat
- Defunct: September 17, 2002
- Headquarters: Mountain View, California, United States
- Products: Telescript; Magic Cap
- Website: genmagic.com at the Wayback Machine (archived 1997-03-27)

General Magic was an American software and early smart phone electronics company co-founded by Bill Atkinson, Andy Hertzfeld, and Marc Porat. Based in Mountain View, California, the company developed precursors to USB, software modems, small touchscreens, touchscreen controller integrated circuits, ASICs, multimedia email, networked games, streaming TV, and early e-commerce notions.

The company's main product was Magic Cap, the operating system used in 1994 by Sony's Magic Link and the Motorola Envoy PDAs. It also introduced the programming language Telescript. After announcing it would cease operations in 2002, it was liquidated in 2004 with Paul Allen purchasing many of its patents.

== History ==
=== Apple project and spinoff (1989) ===
The original project started in 1989 within Apple Computer, when Marc Porat convinced Apple's then-CEO John Sculley that the next generation of computing would require a partnership of computer, communications and consumer electronics companies to cooperate. Known as the Paradigm project, the project ran for some time within Apple, but management remained generally uninterested and the team struggled for resources. Eventually they approached Sculley with the idea of spinning off the group as a separate company, which occurred in May 1990 with founders Marc Porat, Andy Hertzfeld, and Bill Atkinson. Apple took a minority stake in the company, with John Sculley joining the General Magic board.

Porat, Hertzfeld and Atkinson were soon joined at General Magic by Susan Kare, Joanna Hoffman (vice president of marketing), Wendell Sander, Walt Broedner and Megan Smith who joined from Apple Japan, and most of Apple's System 7 team, including Phil Goldman and soon after Bruce Leak and Darin Adler.

=== Early years (1992–1994) ===
The company initially operated in near-complete secrecy. By 1992, some of the world's largest electronics corporations, including Sony, Motorola, Matsushita, Philips and AT&T Corporation were partners and investors in General Magic, creating significant buzz in the industry. Sculley, Motorola CEO George Fisher, Sony president Norio Ogha, and AT&T division chairman Victor Pelsen became board members. As the operations expanded, the company reportedly let rabbits roam the offices to inspire creativity.

In 1992–1993, while Sculley was still a director of General Magic, Apple entered the consumer electronics market with a poorly-received personal digital assistant that became the Apple Newton. By early 1993, Newton (originally designed as a tablet with no communications capabilities) started to attract market interest away from General Magic.

In February 1993, the company had 100 employees. On February 8, The New York Times referred to General Magic as "Silicon Valley's most closely watched start-up company." It reported that the company was introducing software technology called Telescript with the intent of creating a "standard for transmitting messages among any machines that compute, regardless of who makes them." The company also announced the software Magic Cap, an operating system catering to communications. Telescript would eventually be released in 1996 at the start of the Internet boom.

In an article titled "Here's Where Woodstock Meets Silicon Valley," on February 27, 1993, The New York Times reported that General Magic had backing from American Telephone and Telegraph, Sony, Motorola, Philips Electronics and Matsushita Electric Industrial. Marc Porat remained the chief executive of the company.

By 1994, the "General Magic Alliance" of cross-industry partners had expanded to 16 global telecommunications and consumer electronics companies, including Cable & Wireless, France Telecom, NTT, Northern Telecom, Toshiba, Oki, Sanyo, Mitsubishi, and Fujitsu. Each of the so-called "Founding Partners" invested up to $6 million in the company and named a senior executive to the company's "Founding Partner's Council".

The first "General Magic Alliance" hardware products, using the Magic Cap software, were two personal digital assistants (PDAs) that came out in the summer of 1994, with Motorola producing the Motorola Envoy Personal Wireless Communicator and Sony producing the US$800 (equivalent to $1,740 in 2025) wireline Sony Magic Link. Alliance partner AT&T launched its PersonaLink network to host the devices, a closed network that did not connect to the emerging internet. AT&T eventually shut down the PersonaLink network in 1996.

=== IPO (1995) ===
The company launched an IPO on NASDAQ in February 1995. General Magic raised $96 million in the IPO, and a total of $200 million from 16 different investors. The company's stock value doubled after its IPO.

=== Portico service (1996) ===
Steve Markman was hired to run General Magic in 1996, and he hired Kevin Surace to head a new telephony group. This new team of 60–70 people set out to create a voice recognition-based personal assistant service that would be as close to human interaction as possible. The first service delivered was Portico (code named Serengeti during development), and the interface was called Mary, named after Mary McDonald-Lewis, who voiced Portico, Serengeti and GM's later version, OnStar. Portico synchronized to devices such as the Palm Connected Organizer and Microsoft Outlook and handled voicemail, call forwarding, email, calendar etc., all through the user's own personal 800 number. General Magic was the first company to employ a large number of linguists to make their software seem real and responses varied, with General Magic investors receiving several key patents relating to voice recognition and artificial personality.

The Portico system was also scaled back and sold through many partners including Quest and Excite. At its peak, the system supported approximately 2.5 million users. In 1997, Steve Markman hired Linda Hayes as Chief Marketing Officer, who in turn hired a new marketing team, which launched Portico. The Portico launch is attributed with lifting General Magic's stock price from $1 in 1997 to $18 in 2000.

According to Fast Company, the company's original [device] idea was "practically, dead," with people not buying General Magic devices in quantity.

=== Spinoffs and myTalk (1998–2000) ===
While Portico ran its voice portal business, the original handheld group was spun off in 1998 as Icras. The new company sold the Magic Cap OS as hardware named DataRover and focused on vertical market systems.

General Magic announced a major licensing deal and investments from Microsoft in March 1998. The deal gave Microsoft access to certain intellectual property, and helped General Magic move toward integrating Portico with Microsoft products.

The OnStar Virtual Advisor was developed at this time as well for General Motors.

In 1999, the marketing team developed a separate consumer product called MyTalk. Created by Kevin Wray, the MyTalk product was a success and went on to win the Computerworld Smithsonian Award for the first commercially successful voice recognition consumer product. Today MyTalk was also listed in the permanent Smithsonian Museum collection. Because of the product's momentum, the intent was to spin off Hayes' group with Wray leading product management. However, because of failure to agree on technology licensing terms, the spin-off stalled.

=== Shutdown (1999–2004) ===
By 1999, the company's stock had plunged significantly, with Forbes attributing the drop to "losses, layoffs and missed projections." Most of the management that was involved in bringing Portico to market left by early 2000 to pursue other interests with Internet startups. A new team was brought in led by Kathleen Layton. The new team took the company in the direction of turning its voice services into enterprise software offerings. The company announced it would cease operations on September 18, 2002. The company was liquidated in 2004. The OnStar assets were turned over to EDS to run for General Motors. The patents were auctioned by the court.

Most of the patents the company had developed were purchased by Paul Allen.

== Products and technology ==
According to Electronics Weekly, the company "developed a precursor of USB, software modems, small touchscreens, touchscreen controller ICs, ASICs, multimedia email, networked games, streaming TV and early e-commerce notions."

=== Magic Cap ===
General Magic's main product was Magic Cap, an operating system (OS) which allowed users to "set their own rules for message alerts and acquiring information" on PDAs, according to CNET. The basic idea behind the system was to distribute the typical computing load across many machines in the network using Magic Cap, which was a fairly minimal operating system that was essentially a UI. The UI is based on a "rooms" metaphor; for example, e-mail and an address book can be found in the office, and games might be found in a living room. User applications were generally written in Magic Script, a utility language variant of the C programming language with object oriented extensions.

It was used on the Envoy PDA by Motorola and the MagicLink PDA by Sony. Sony and Motorola introduced Magic Cap devices in late 1994, based on the Motorola 68300 Dragon microprocessor. The launch suffered from a lack of real supporting infrastructure. Unlike the Newton and other PDAs being introduced at the same time, the Magic Cap system also did not rely on handwriting recognition, putting it at a marketing disadvantage. Partners ended production of Magic Cap devices by 1997.

General Magic planned to release Magic Cap software development tools with Metrowerks by the summer of 1995.

=== Telescript ===
Its other software, Telescript, was "software-agent technology that would search the Web and automatically retrieve information such as stock quotes and airline ticket prices." The script was introduced with the intent of creating a "standard for transmitting messages among any machines that compute, regardless of who makes them."

The Telescript programming language made communications a first-class primitive of the language. Telescript is compiled into a cross-platform bytecode in much the same fashion as the Java programming language, but is able to migrate running processes between virtual machines. The developers saw a time when Telescript application engines would be ubiquitous, and interconnected Telescript engines would form a "Telescript Cloud" across which mobile applications could execute.

== Legacy ==
The company achieved many technical breakthroughs, including software modems (eliminating the need for modem chips), small touchscreens and touchscreen controller ASICs, highly integrated systems-on-a-chip designs for its partners' devices, rich multimedia email, networked games, streaming television, and early versions of e-commerce.

According to former General Magic employee Marco DeMiroz, it was the "Fairchild of the 90s."

A documentary film, General Magic, opened at the Tribeca Film Festival on April 20, 2018. It was later shown at the SFFilm Festival in San Francisco on November 3, 2018. The company founders had hired filmmakers including Sarah Kerruish to document their development process in the 1990s, and Kerruish included some of that original footage of General Magic's offices in the film. The film includes interviews with Marc Porat, Andy Hertzfeld, Joanna Hoffman, Megan Smith, and Tony Fadell.
