= Phil Goldman =

American software engineer and businessman

Phillip York Goldman
- Born: July 17, 1964; California, U.S.
- Died: December 26, 2003 (aged 39); Los Altos Hills, California, U.S.
- Resting place: Hills of Eternity Memorial Park, Colma, California, U.S.
- Education: Princeton University (B.S., Engineering)
- Occupations: Software engineer, businessman
- Years active: 1986–2003
- Known for: Co-founding WebTV
- Spouse: Susan Rayl
- Children: 2

Phillip York Goldman (July 17, 1964 – December 26, 2003) was an American software engineer and entrepreneur. He was a Macintosh software engineer at Apple Inc., and was best known for co-founding WebTV.

== Early life ==
Phillip York Goldman was born July 17, 1964, in California. He grew up in San Mateo and Hillsborough, California. Goldman attended San Mateo High School, graduating in 1982.

He graduated first in his engineering class, Phi Beta Kappa, from Princeton University in 1986, in a class that also included Jeff Bezos and David Hitz, founder of NetApp. He served as chair of Princeton's Computer Science Advisory Council, and in 1998, Goldman, along with his wife Susan, donated $2 million to his alma mater to endow a chair, becoming the youngest alumnus ever to do so.

Goldman would go on to hold 19 patents, and had 30 more patents pending at the time of his death.

== Career ==
After college, Goldman went to work for Apple Computer, where he and Erich Ringewald wrote Multifinder (originally called Twitcher) for the Macintosh operating system. Steve Perlman and Bruce Leak were also working for Apple at the time: Steve in the Advanced Technology Group, and Bruce working on QuickDraw and QuickTime. All three eventually left Apple, Perlman founding Replay Networks, Phil going to General Magic, and Bruce founding Rocket Science Games.

In 1995, the three founded Artemis Research, which became WebTV Networks, Inc., offering a dialup thin client sold to consumers on the basis of ease-of-use and modest cost.

WebTV was literally a Silicon Valley garage startup, having been founded in half of a storage building for the Museum of American Heritage on Alma Street in Palo Alto. Two early employees of Artemis who were also from Apple were Andy Rubin and Joe Britt, who would be two of the founders of Danger, Inc. (originally Danger Research). WebTV leveraged their limited startup funds, provided in part by Microsoft co-founder Paul Allen, by licensing a reference design for the appliance to Sony and Philips. Eventually other companies would also become licensees and WebTV would profit on the monthly service fees. After 22 months, the company was sold to Microsoft for $425 million, with each of the three founders receiving $64 million.

Even after the sale of WebTV to Microsoft, the three founders remained in management positions with the company. Goldman left in 2002 to found MailBlocks, Inc., an e-mail provider using whitelisting to fight spam.

== Personal life ==
Goldman tried to build a Jack in the Box restaurant near his office in Los Altos, California, but the city refused him permission. In contrast, his long hours lifting weights at the gym and fastidious diet earned him the nickname "Fat-Free Phil." Goldman's house rabbit, a gray dwarf, became the unofficial mascot of General Magic. Named "Bowser", it moved to WebTV Networks when Goldman did, roaming the halls, offices and conference rooms, sometimes chewing on cables. The programmers at WebTV adopted "Bowser" as the code name for their browser.

Goldman also served as a director of BraveKids, a charity that uses the internet to provide information and support for families of children with serious illnesses.

Goldman died on December 26, 2003, at the age 39 at his home in Los Altos Hills, California. The cause of death was a heart attack. He is buried at Hills of Eternity Memorial Park in Colma, California. He is survived by wife Susan Rayl and their two children.
