= FarmWise =

US agricultural technology company

FarmWise Labs, Inc.
- Company type: Private
- Industry: Agricultural technology, robotics
- Predecessor: DeepLook, Inc.
- Founded: May 31, 2016; 8 years ago in San Francisco, California
- Founders: Sebastien Boyer, Thomas Palomares
- Headquarters: Salinas, California and San Francisco, United States
- Area served: California, Arizona
- Key people: Sebastien Boyer (Cofounder and CEO), Thomas Palomares (Cofounder and CTO), Bruce Leak (Board member)
- Products: Titan FT-35, an automated weeding robot
- Number of employees: 50 (2020)
- Website: farmwiselabs.com

FarmWise Labs, Inc. (established 2016) is an American agricultural technology and robotics company, based in California. Its first product is an automated mechanical weeder that uses a combination of AI, computer vision and robotics to pull out weeds in vegetable fields without using chemicals. It won several industry innovation awards related to agriculture and sustainability.

== History ==
FarmWise was founded in 2016 in San Francisco by Sebastien Boyer, a graduate of École Polytechnique and Massachusetts Institute of Technology, and Thomas Palomares, a graduate of École Polytechnique and Stanford University. With a first prototype of weeding robot, the founders went through The Alchemist Accelerator program and the THRIVE by SVG Accelerator program in 2017.

In December 2017, the firm closed a $5.7 million seed round from investors who included Playground Global, Felicis Ventures, Lemnos, Basis Set Ventures and Valley Oak Investments. Following the seed round, Playground's Bruce Leak entered the board of directors.

In 2018, once the second generation of the FarmWise robot was up and running, the company started pilot programs with two early customers from the Central Coast of California and tied bonds with the Western Growers Association. It then became a resident of Western Growers Association Center for Innovation and Technology.

In March 2019, the firm partnered with Michigan-based manufacturing and automotive company Roush to build the third generation of its robotic weeders, Titan FT-35.

In September 2019, the company raised $14.5 million in Series A financing led by Calibrate Ventures.

In October 2020, the firm opened a location in Yuma, Arizona and started doing work in Imperial Valley, California.

== Products and services ==
FarmWise builds and operates automated mechanical weeders. Rather than selling their equipment to farmers, it provides its service for a fee per acre.

== Technology ==
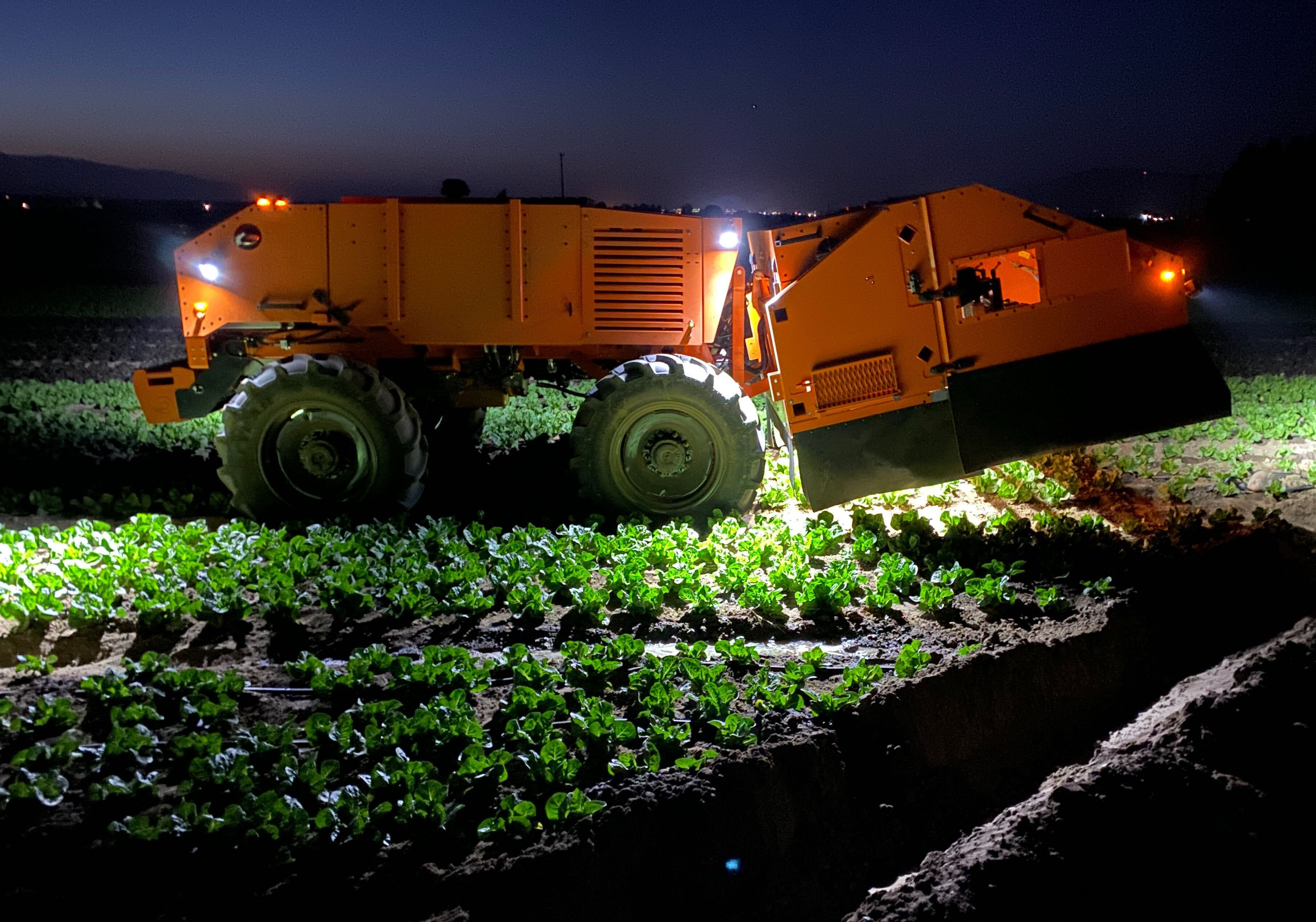
FarmWise's Titan robot working on a lettuce field at night (May 2020)

FarmWise relies on a patented technology which combines AI, computer vision and robotics to remove weeds in vegetable fields. The company's latest machine model, Titan FT-35, consists of a self-propelled, tractor and a smart implement that encompasses a set of cameras and sensors, and robotic arms.

When working on the field, the machine uses an AI-enabled detection feature to actuate blades around and in-between the crops and in the furrows. In order for their weeding system to operate successfully, the team trained machine learning algorithms on millions of crop images, so that the machine can differentiate between crops and weeds and apprehend the 3D geometry of each plant it encounters. The software is updated every week, using new field data.

The machine is built to work on multiple crops and keep expanding its set of crops using machine learning computer software. Beyond weeding, the company is adapting its equipment to perform more activities on the field.

== Awards and recognition ==
FarmWise won several industry awards including AgFunder Innovation Awards in "Most Innovative U.S. Start-up Pre-Series A" nomination in 2018, "The Young Tech Entrepreneurs" French American Business Awards (FABA) award to the company's founders in 2019 and "Good Robot" award from Silicon Valley Robotics in 2020. FarmWise was recognized by the Business Insider, SVG Capital/THRIVE, the Institute of Electrical and Electronics Engineers, and Time magazine in their coverage of innovative upcoming technologies.

In 2018, Forbes included the company's founders into its "2019 30 Under 30: Manufacturing & Industry" list and MIT Technology Review recognized Sébastien Boyer in its "Innovators Under 35 Europe 2018" award.

In 2020, the company was listed as one of the leading vendors of Robotic Weeding Machines by analysts.
