= Owl Labs =

Video conferencing technology company

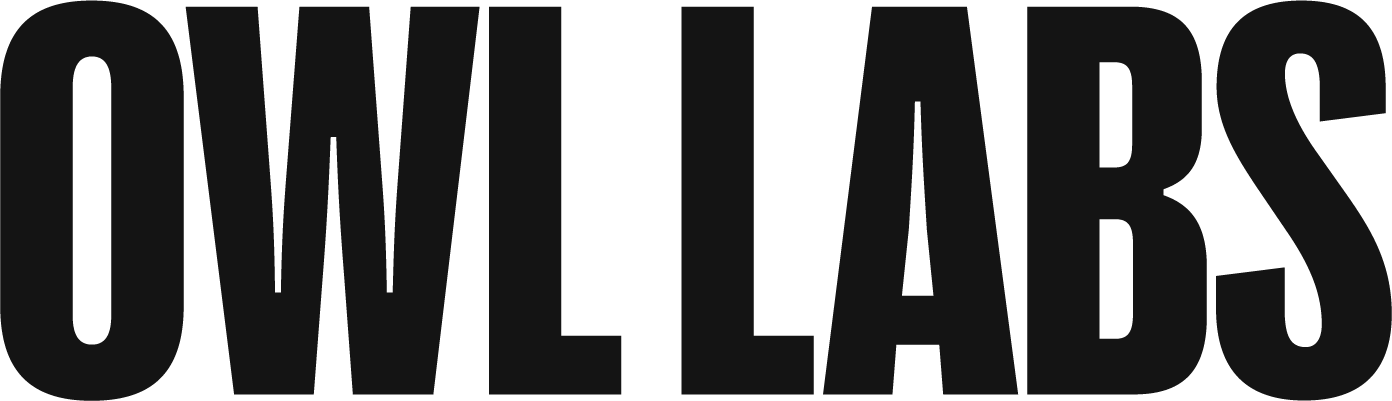
- Industry: Video conferencing devices
- Founded: 2014
- Founders: Max Makeev; Mark Schnittman
- Headquarters: Somerville, Massachusetts, United States
- Key people: Frank Weishaupt (CEO); John Stevens (CFO); Max Makeev (Cofounder); Mark Schnittman (Cofounder); Ben Macdonald (VP Global Sales & Channels); Ashley Karr (SVP, Global Marketing); Gloria Lau (SVP, Engineering); Ben Harman (VP, People & Business Operations); Jeff Wilen (SVP, Product)
- Products: Meeting Owl 3, Owl Bar, Whiteboard Owl, Expansion Mic
- Number of employees: 100+ (2023)
- Website: www.owllabs.com

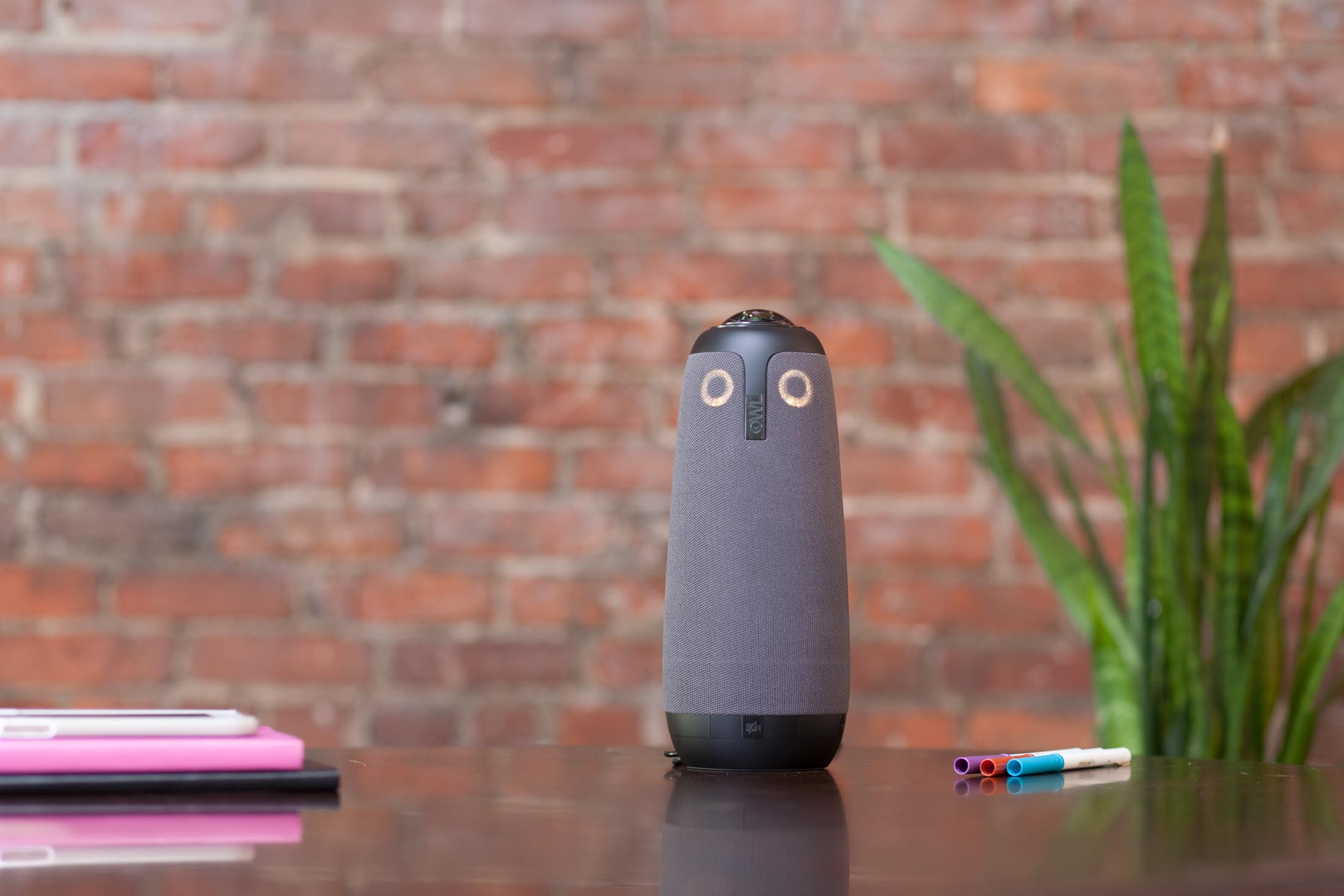
The Meeting Owl is a 360 degree video conferencing device.

Owl Labs is an American company that makes 360° video conferencing devices called the "Meeting Owl", the "Meeting Owl Pro" and the "Meeting Owl 3." It was founded in 2014 by robotics experts Max Makeev and Mark Schnittman. It raised a total of $7.3M in venture capital from seed and Series A rounds led by serial entrepreneur Andy Rubin (via his Playground Global fund), Antonio Rodriguez (general partner at Matrix Partners) and iRobot Ventures. In June 2017, it announced its Meeting Owl device. VentureBeat noted that unlike others Meeting Owl has "...a single 360-degree camera that can recognize and highlight the person speaking..." The device contains a Qualcomm Snapdragon processor.

In 2023, Owl Labs launched "Owl Bar", a front-of-room camera, microphone and speaker video conferencing device that seamlessly connects with a 360-degree camera and audio device.

Owl Labs was recognized by the New England Venture Capital Association with a NEVY Award for "Hottest Tech Startup".
