= Peter Barrett =

Peter Barrett may refer to:

- Peter Barrett (illustrator) (born 1935), British painter, illustrator, graphic designer and children's book author
- Peter Barrett (bishop) (1956–2015), Church of Ireland bishop
- Peter Barrett (sailor) (1935–2000), American sailor
- Peter Barrett (cricketer) (1955–1983), English cricketer
- Peter Barrett (geologist) (1940–2026), New Zealand geologist and professor at Victoria University of Wellington
- Peter Barrett (politician) (1831–1907), member of the Tasmanian House of Assembly
- Peter Barrett (entrepreneur), Australian businessman
