= Vasseti Group =

The Vasseti Group consists of multiple businesses in various fields, ranging from telecommunications to lifestyle concepts. As of 3 January 2011, the Vasseti Group began operations in its new corporate headquarters at Plaza Sentral, in close proximity with KL Sentral Station. This is also the same location as the Vasseti Concierge office on the ground floor which serves as Vasseti's front lines, providing information on anything and everything Vasseti-related.

In August 2010, Malaysian billionaire Syed Yusof, chairman of the Vasseti Group bought his own stake in the group – totaling at 30%. Also in August 2010, Vasseti introduced 1,000 Mbit/s internet service to parts of Kuala Lumpur for RM199 per month. chief executive officer of Vasseti, Ahmad Razmy Abdul Rashid, said that the new deployment will help web TV (sometimes referred to as IPTV or Internet-Protocol-Television), voice-over-internet-protocol (VoIP) as well as surveillance.
