= CIQ =

CIQ may refer to:

- Ctrl IQ, a software infrastructure company built on Rocky Linux
- Capital IQ, a financial information provider
- Customer Information Questionnaire, a form by telecommunication equipment manufacturers used to create parameters for 3G NodeBs, 4G ENodeBs and 5G gNodeBs for Mobile network operators
- Cultural Industries Quarter, a district in Sheffield, England
- Carrier IQ, a mobile software company
- Customs, Immigration, Quarantine - services at a port or airport
