= Peter Barrett (entrepreneur) =

Australian entrepreneur

- Occupation: Entrepreneur
- Employer: Playground Global
- Known for: Rocket Science Games

Peter Barrett is an Australian entrepreneur. He is a co-founder of Playground Global, a venture fund and design studio providing resources, mentorship and funding to startups making hardware devices. Prior to Playground, Barrett served as CTO at CloudCar, a cloud-based consumer products startup. He has also held executive positions at Microsoft and WebTV, where he worked with Playground co-founders Andy Rubin and Bruce Leak.

Barrett also co-founded Rocket Science Games, a video game development company, where he helped pioneer CD-ROMs as a video game distribution method.
