= MailBlocks =

- Company type: Subsidiary of AOL
- Founded: United States
- Headquarters: United States

MailBlocks is an e-mail hosting service company based in the United States, originally established by Phil Goldman in 2002. It was acquired by AOL on August 3, 2004.

== Service ==
Mailblocks offered free challenge-response spam filtering web email service and an IMAP interface as a revenue service.

== Patent Troll Controversy ==
Mailblocks did not invent challenge response to block spam. Instead, they purchased the rights to two patents related to challenge response: patents US6199102 and US6112227. Mailblocks then proceeded to patent troll several other companies before releasing any product of their own. Companies sued included Spam Arrest, DigiPortal, MailFrontier, and Earthlink. A challenge response was a well known technique for fighting personal spam and mailing list spam for years before the two patents were applied for. For example, David Skoll described it in detail in a post to a public forum on November 15, 1996.
