= Mova (camera system) =

Mova Contour is a multi-camera high resolution facial capture system originally developed by former Apple Computer engineer Steve Perlman. It records surfaces (specifically of actors' faces) digitally, by using fluorescent makeup and stereo triangulation, allowing for very detailed digitization and manipulation. The system captures images which are then used to generate dense per frame surface reconstructions. It then generates a temporally coherent mesh by tracking an invisible random pattern of fluorescent makeup that is applied to the capture surface.

Mova technology was first used in The Curious Case of Benjamin Button for building a realistic 3D face model of Brad Pitt. The first film credit that Mova technology received was for its use in The Incredible Hulk to capture Edward Norton's expressions and superimpose them onto the Hulk. It has subsequently been used in over 15 feature films and games. However, in recent years it attracted controversy due to a series of lawsuits filed by Perlman over its use in motion pictures such as Guardians of the Galaxy, Avengers: Age of Ultron, and Beauty and the Beast.
