= MSN Chat =

Internet chat service

MSN Chat was the Microsoft Network version of IRCX (Internet Relay Chat extensions by Microsoft), which replaced Microsoft Chat, a set of Exchange-based IRCX servers first available in the Microsoft Comic Chat client, although Comic Chat was not required to connect.

== Client compatibility ==
According to the MSN Chat website, the following were required to use the MSN Chat Service:

- Windows 95 or later
- Internet Explorer 4.0 or later OR;
- Netscape Navigator 4.x

The Microsoft Network Chat Control was developed as an ActiveX Component Object Model (COM) Object. ActiveX, being a Microsoft technology provided limited compatibility for other products. The other major platforms beside Internet Explorer that MSN Chat was supported on, was Netscape Navigator and MSNTV (formerly known as WebTV). To ensure the MSN Chat network was only being connected to by authorized clients, Microsoft created and implemented a SASL based Security Service Provider authentication package known as GateKeeper. This used a randomized session key to authorize users not using the Microsoft Passport (now Microsoft account) system. Microsoft used another SSP known as GateKeeperPassport, that worked from the same method but required certain attributes related to the user's account.

== Similar services ==
The legality of sites offering the MSN Chat Control has been in question for some time due to many "Clone Sites" hosting the Chat Control. The Chat Control download is publicly available by Microsoft to download at .

== Problems with MSN Chat ==
A significant reason for MSN Chat shutting down was that it provided another opportunity for pedophiles and other sex-offenders to have access to youth through the chat rooms.

== Closure ==
In 2001, Microsoft closed access via IRC clients (including Comic Chat), asking users to exclusively use their browser client instead. In 2003, Microsoft announced that it would close "unregulated" MSN Chat rooms in 28 countries, including "most of Asia" due to problems with spam and concerns about child sexual abuse material, with plans to convert to a subscription model for "better accountability." Messenger chat services remained open. MSN Chat became a subscription service for $20/year.

On August 31, 2006 Microsoft announced that MSN Chat would no longer be provided. On October 16, 2006 MSN Chat shut down their servers at about 11:30 a.m. EST. The service closed as allegedly MSN no longer deemed it profitable to run as a subscription service.

== See also ==
- MSN Messenger/Windows Live Messenger, another messaging service owned by Microsoft.
- Skype, a messaging service bought by Microsoft.
