= Hargray =

American telecommunications provider

Hargray Communications
- Company type: Subsidiary
- Industry: Telecommunications
- Founded: 1949
- Headquarters: Hilton Head Island, South Carolina
- Area served: Lowcountry and Savannah, Ga. regions
- Products: Cable television, Broadband Internet, Landline
- Parent: Cable One
- Website: www.hargray.com

Hargray Communications is a telecommunications provider based on Hilton Head Island, South Carolina, United States. It operates internet throughout the Lowcountry region of South Carolina and the Savannah region of Georgia. Hargray has a monopoly on parts of the Lowcountry offering cable television, broadband Internet, and landline services. Hargray formerly resold cellular phone service through Cricket. As of 2021, Hargray was acquired by Cable One and is now under the Sparklight brand.

== History ==
Hargray was founded in the 1940s in nearby Hardeeville under the name Harcan Telephone by Leroy Harvey. Throughout the following decades, Hargray expanded in Bluffton and eventually onto Hilton Head Island. By the 1980s, Hargray began offering cable television service to customers in the region in addition to telephone service. In 2007, Hargray was acquired by Quadrangle Capital Partners. Several years later, in 2010, Quadrangle unsuccessfully attempted to sell Hargray. In May 2021, Hargray was acquired by Cable One.

=== Data Publishing ===
Hargray established Data Publishing in 1986. It is responsible for publishing all of the Horry Telephone Directories. The company continued to expand and publish directories for other companies including Horry Telephone Cooperative and Windstream, among others. Under Quadrangle's ownership of Hargray, the company was ultimately sold to Horry Telephone Cooperative. The deal was completed in September 2012.

=== Acquisitions ===
Hargray has acquired several cable systems in its service area, including Charter's system in Beaufort as well as a few systems from Shentel.

In February 2020, Hargray acquired Electronet, a fiber-based broadband communications company operating in Tallahassee, Florida.

== Technology ==
Multiple technologies are employed depending on region, all reaching from the core headend and central office in Pritchardville, South Carolina.

For television, Hargray deploys IPTV or QAM digital TV service over coaxial cable. IPTV is handled via the Ericsson Mediaroom platform.

Voice services (POTS) are carried over both VoIP and copper telephone line.

Internet is provided by either DOCSIS 3.1 cable modems, ADSL modems, or fiber to the home. Hargray also provides public WiFi service and dial-up to customers.

As of September 27, 2012, Hargray has completed an integration of 7,000 Charter customers in the Beaufort, South Carolina area. Hargray Communications Group has 350 total employees across all of its locations and generates $101.43 million in 2017 for sales (USD).
