= Artemis Networks =

American telecommunications company

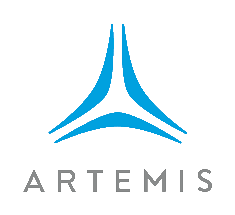
- Industry: Wireless
- Products: pCell, pWave
- Website: www.artemis.com

Artemis Networks is a wireless technology company responsible for the software-defined radio technologies pCell and pWave. Artemis claims pCell technology is capable of speeds hundreds of times faster than other technologies under conditions of heavy usage and interference. Its founder and CEO is Steve Perlman.

== History ==
Artemis was founded in the early 2000s, operating in stealth mode through the Rearden incubator, founded by Perlman. Chief scientist Antonio Forenza and Perlman released a white paper in 2011 that promoted what it called Distributed-Input-Distributed-Output technology. Following the release of white paper and an on-camera presentation, debate arose regarding the legitimacy of the technology, due to its perceived violation of the noisy-channel coding theorem's “Shannon limit”.

In May 2013, Rearden LLC sought an experimentation license from the FCC. In response to an FCC question, the company disclosed that each experimental transmitter unit would contain up to 100 antennas.

In February 2014 Perlman and Forenza promoted the company and technology at Columbia University. In 2015, the technology was called pCell.

== Technology ==
Artemis says pCell technology is able to work around physical barriers that apply to conventional wireless data transmission. The basis for the technology is software-defined radio which uses interference to create individual virtual cell sites for each wireless user. By tightly coordinating the transmissions from each cell transmitter, the effects of interference between cells is canceled out at each user's location, allowing the deployment of hundreds of times as many cell transmitters over the same area. This reduces the ratio of users per cell, and inversely increases each user's share of the network capacity. Ultimately, if the network deploys as many cell stations as there are users, then each user effectively has their own cell without the need to share with other users.

Artemis says that pCell technology is more flexible than conventional cellular wireless technology. Conventional technology can also deploy additional cells to reduce the user-per-cell ratio, but it requires each cell to run at reduced power to avoid interfering with its neighbouring cells. This reduces the service area of each cell to serve only those users nearest to it. On the other hand, adding additional pCells does not require power reductions, and the pCell can contribute bandwidth to users even when they are closer to other pCells. This means that pCells can be more effective than conventional cellular when users are distributed unevenly between the cells. This works best in open areas where there are no obstacles blocking the signals between the user and multiple pCells.

In a demonstration at Columbia University, a demonstration transmitter unit ran off 1 milliwatt of power (equivalent power to Class 3 Bluetooth) and transmitted video simultaneously over a few metres to about 8 devices. Battery power may also be saved on the devices connected to the pCell technology compared to conventional 4G LTE.

The Artemis website shows 3 demonstration videos, the previously described Columbia University one, another at Code Conference with 20 iPads, and a lab demo showing 16 phones sharing 8 cells.

Artemis says cellphones and devices that support LTE could be compatible with pCell networks without replacement of the radios. Perlman refutes claims that pCell is simply MU-MIMO, saying that pCells are spaced farther apart than LTE MIMO.

Artemis Networks partnered with Boldyn Networks to showcase its pCell technology in the New York City Times Square in February 2024. The demo reached a peak throughput of 700 Mbps and the companies said it was about ten times as fast as the fastest 5G networks they measured it against.
