= Mediaroom =

Software suite for IPTV services

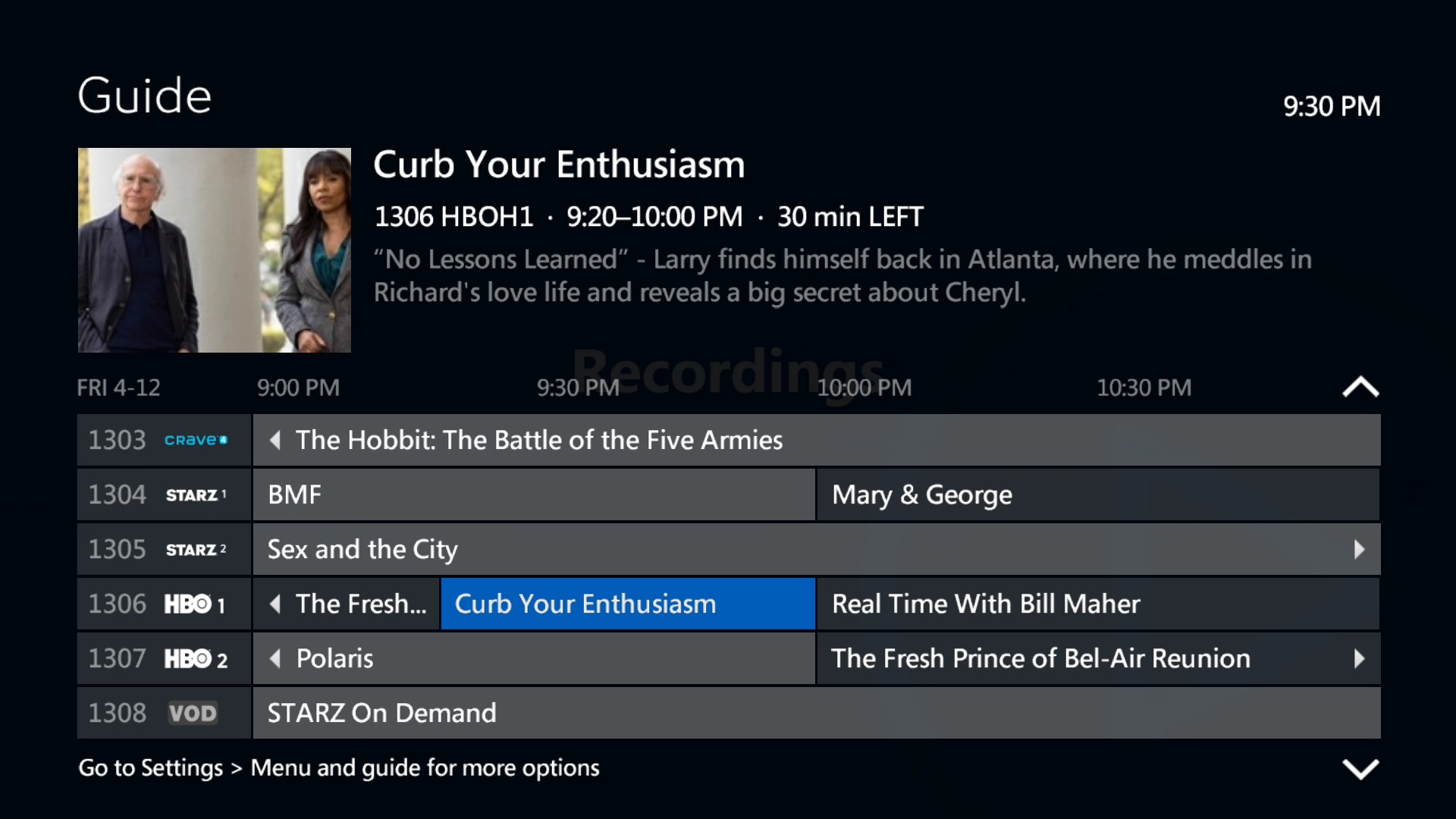
- Program Guide in Mediaroom
- Developers: Microsoft (2007–2013); Ericsson (2013–2018); MediaKind (2018–present)
- Initial release: July 2007; 18 years ago
- Operating system: Microsoft Windows; Windows CE; Microsoft Phone iOS; Android (operating system); Linux
- Platform: Set Top Box; Video game console Personal computer Tablet computer Smartphone
- Website: Mediaroom

Mediaroom is a collection of software for operators to deliver IPTV (IPTV) subscription services, including content-protected, live, digital video recorder, video on demand, multiscreen, and applications. These services can be delivered via a range of devices inside and outside customers' homes, including wired and Wi-Fi set top boxes, PCs, tablets, smartphones and other connected devices – over both the operator's managed IP networks as well as "over the top" (OTT) or unmanaged networks.

According to a marketing firm, Mediaroom was the market leader in IPTV for 2014.

== History ==
=== Microsoft TV platform ===
Microsoft announced an UltimateTV service from DirecTV in October 2000, based on technology acquired from WebTV Networks (later renamed MSN TV). The software was called the Microsoft TV platform (which included the Foundation Edition); it had integrated digital video recorder (DVR) and Internet access capabilities. It was released on October 26, 2000. The software to decode and view digital video programming was derived from WebTV (later called MSN TV). UltimateTV had support for picture-in-picture and could record up to 35 hours of video content. The Internet capabilities were provided by Microsoft TV platform software, which was used for the TV guide. The TV guide could display programming schedule for 14 days, and recording could be scheduled for any of the shows. It could also be used to access E-mail. However, Microsoft lost distribution when DirecTV accepted an acquisition bid by Echostar, who had their own DVR. By 2003, it was taken off the market, even though it is still supported by DirecTV and the acquisition by Echostar failed.

The UltimateTV developers in Mountain View, California were eliminated by early 2002. By June 2002, Moshe Lichtman replaced Jon DeVaan as leader of the division as more reductions were announced.

==== Foundation Edition ====
The Microsoft TV Foundation Edition platform integrated video-on-demand (VOD), DVR and HDTV programming with live television programming. It includes an electronic programming guide (EPG) that could be used to access any supported service from a centralized directory. The EPG could be used to search and filter the listings as well. The EPG was released around 2002. Comcast announced it would adopt this software in May 2004. Microsoft TV Foundation Edition platform also included an authoring environment that could be used to create content consumable from the set top box.

==== IPTV Edition ====
Microsoft TV IPTV Edition is an IPTV platform for accessing both on-demand as well as live television content over a 2-way IP network, coupled with DVR functionality. It is to be used with cable networks that have an IPTV infrastructure.

=== Microsoft Mediaroom ===
The IPTV platform was renamed Microsoft Mediaroom on June 18, 2007 at the NXTcomm conference. In January 2010, Microsoft Mediaroom 2.0 was announced at the International Consumer Electronics Show. On April 8, 2013, Microsoft and Ericsson announced plans for Ericsson to purchase Mediaroom. The sale was completed on September 5, 2013, and the platform officially became Ericsson Mediaroom.

=== Mediaroom ===
On February 6, 2014, Ericsson announced it had entered into an agreement to purchase multiscreen video platform company Azuki Systems. Azuki Systems was renamed Ericsson Mediaroom Reach.

=== MediaKind ===
On July 10, 2018, it was announced that the new identity of Ericsson Media Solutions is MediaKind. The CEO is Allen Broome.

== Products ==
Current key products in Mediaroom's portfolio include Mediaroom, Mediaroom Reach, and MediaFirst TV Platform.

As of June 2016, Mediaroom TV was used in 65 commercial deployments in 34 countries, delivering services to over 16 million households via more than 30 million devices.

Mediaroom TV platforms are offered by 90 operators, including AT&T, Deutsche Telekom, CenturyLink, Telus, Hawaiian Telcom, Bell Canada (including Bell MTS), Hargray, Singtel, Telefónica SA, Cross Telephone, and Portugal Telecom.

== See also ==
- Windows Media Center
- Interactive television
- Smart TV
- List of smart TV platforms and middleware software
- 10-foot user interface
- Set-top box
- Tasman (browser engine)
- Xbox Video
