= MSN TV =

Thin client that used a television for display

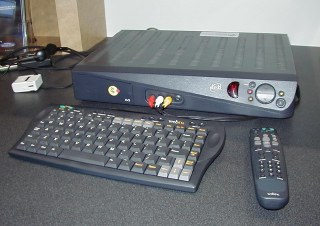
- WebTV hardware (specifically, the Dish Network DishPlayer DVR)
- Formerly: WebTV (September 1996 – April 1997); Microsoft WebTV (April 1997 – July 2001)
- Type: Subsidiary
- Industry: Web access
- Founded: July 1995; 31 years ago
- Founders: Steve Perlman; Bruce Leak; Phil Goldman
- Defunct: September 30, 2013
- Headquarters: Palo Alto, California, United States
- Number of employees: 70 (1996)
- Parent: Microsoft

MSN TV (formerly WebTV) was a web access product consisting of a thin client device that used a television for display (instead of using a computer monitor), and the online service that supported it. The original WebTV device design and service were developed by WebTV Networks, Inc., a company started in 1995. The WebTV product was announced in July 1996 and later released on September 18, 1996. In April 1997, the company was purchased by Microsoft Corporation and in July 2001, was rebranded to MSN TV and absorbed into MSN.

While most thin clients developed in the mid-1990s were positioned as diskless workstations for corporate intranets, WebTV was positioned as a consumer product, primarily targeting those looking for a low-cost alternative to a computer for Internet access. The WebTV and MSN TV devices allowed a television set to be connected to the Internet, mainly for web browsing and e-mail. The WebTV/MSN TV service, however, also offered its own exclusive services such as a "walled garden" newsgroup service, news and weather reports, storage for user bookmarks (Favorites), IRC (and for a time, MSN Chat) chatrooms, a Page Builder service that let WebTV users create and host webpages that could later be shared to others via a link if desired, the ability to play background music from a predefined list of songs while surfing the web, dedicated sections for aggregated content covering various topics (entertainment, romance, stocks, etc.), and a few years after Microsoft bought out WebTV, integration with MSN Messenger and Hotmail. The setup included a thin client in the form of a set-top box, a remote, a network connection using dial-up, or with the introduction of Rogers Interactive TV and the MSN TV 2, the option to use broadband, and a wireless keyboard, which was sold optionally up until the 2000s.

The MSN TV service lasted for 18 years, shutting down on September 30, 2013, and allowing subscribers to migrate their data well before that date arrived.

The original WebTV network relied on a Solaris backend network and telephone lines to deliver service to customers via dial-up, with "frontend servers" that talk directly to boxes using a custom protocol, the WebTV Protocol (WTVP), to authenticate users and deliver content to boxes. For the MSN TV 2, however, a completely new service based on IIS servers and regular HTTP/HTTPS services was used.

== History ==
=== Concept ===
I've been working to create an interactive television my entire life. I always knew it was a way of bringing computers to average people.

— Steve Perlman

Co-founder Steve Perlman is credited with the idea for the device. He first combined computer and television as a high-school student when he decided his home PC needed a graphics display. He went on to build software for companies such as Apple and Atari. While working at General Magic, the idea of bringing TVs and computers together resurfaced.

One night, Perlman was browsing the web and came across a Campbell's soup website with recipes. He thought that the people who might be interested in what the site had to offer were not using the web.

=== Early history ===
A Silicon Valley startup, WebTV Networks was founded in July 1995. Perlman brought along co-founders Bruce Leak and Phil Goldman shortly after conceiving the basic concept. The company operated out of half of a former BMW car dealership building on Alma Street in Palo Alto, California, which was being used for storage by the Museum of American Heritage. WebTV had been able to obtain the space for very low rent, but it was suboptimal for technology development.

Before incorporation, the company referred to itself as Artemis Research to disguise the nature of its business. The info page of its original website explained that it was studying "sleep deprivation, poor diet and no social life for extended periods on humans and dwarf rabbits". The dwarf rabbit reference was an inside joke among WebTV's engineers – Phil Goldman's pet house rabbit Bowser (inspiration for the General Magic logo) was often found roaming the WebTV building late into the night while the engineers were working—although WebTV actually received inquiries from real research groups conducting similar studies and seeking to exchange data.

The company hired many engineers and a few business development employees early on, having about 30 total employees by October 1995. Two early employees of Artemis were from Apple Inc: Andy Rubin, creator of the Android cell phone OS, and Joe Britt. Both men would later be founders of Danger, Inc. (originally Danger Research).

WebTV Networks' business model was to license a reference design to consumer electronics companies for a WebTV Internet Terminal, a set-top box that attached to a telephone line and automatically connected to the Internet through a dial-up modem. The consumer electronics companies' income was derived from selling the WebTV set-top box. WebTV's income was derived from operating the WebTV Service, the Internet-based service to which the set-top boxes connected and for which it collected a fee from WebTV subscribers. The service provided features such as HTML-based email, and proxied websites, which were reformatted by the service before they were sent to set-top box, to make them display more efficiently on a television screen.

WebTV closed its first round of financing, US$1,500,000, from Marvin Davis in September 1995, which it used to develop its prototype set-top box, using proprietary hardware and firmware. The company also used the financing to develop the online service that the set-top boxes connected to. WebTV leveraged their limited startup funds by licensing a reference design for the appliance to Sony and Philips. Eventually other companies would also become licensees and WebTV would profit on the monthly service fees.

=== Announcement ===
By the spring of 1996 WebTV Networks employed approximately 70 people, many of them finishing their senior year at nearby Stanford University, or former employees of either Apple Computer or General Magic. WebTV had started negotiating with Sony to manufacture and distribute the WebTV set-top box, but negotiations had taken much longer than WebTV had expected, and WebTV had used up its initial funding. Steve Perlman liquidated his assets, ran up his credit cards and mortgaged his house to provide bridge financing while seeking additional venture capital. Because Sony had insisted upon exclusive distribution rights for the first year, WebTV had no other distribution partner in place, and just before WebTV was to close venture capital financing from Brentwood Associates, Sony sent WebTV a certified letter stating it had decided not to proceed with WebTV. It was a critical juncture for WebTV, because the Brentwood financing had been predicated on the expectation of a future relationship with Sony, and if Brentwood had decided to not proceed with the financing after being told that Sony had backed out, WebTV would have gone bankrupt and Perlman would have lost everything. Brentwood decided to proceed with the financing despite losing Sony's involvement, and further financing from Paul Allen's Vulcan Ventures soon followed.

WebTV then proceeded to close a non-exclusive WebTV set-top box distribution deal with Philips, which provided competitive pressure causing Sony to change its mind, to resume its relationship with WebTV and also to distribute WebTV.

The company Igor Software Laboratories, founded by Steve Hales and Jim Nitchals, licensed its SoundMusicSys engine to WebTV, allowing it to play music in formats such as MIDI. Igor contracted three additional musicians to create original music and sound effects for the device: Brian Salter, Michael Pukish and Peter Drescher. In addition to Igor, Thomas Dolby's audio technology company Beatnik (then known as Headspace) also composed music for the device. This led to Beatnik acquiring Igor and its SoundMusicSys engine, which later became the Beatnik Audio Engine. Dolby considered the usage of sequenced audio to be saving physical space within the devices, while satisfying the needs of television viewers wanting audio to accompany the internet.

WebTV was announced on July 10, 1996, generating a large wave of press attention as not only the first television-based use of the World Wide Web, but also as the first consumer-electronics device to access the World Wide Web without a personal computer. After the product's announcement, the company closed additional venture financing, including investments from Microsoft Corporation, Citicorp, Seagate Technology, Inc., Times Mirror Company, and other companies.

=== The launch ===
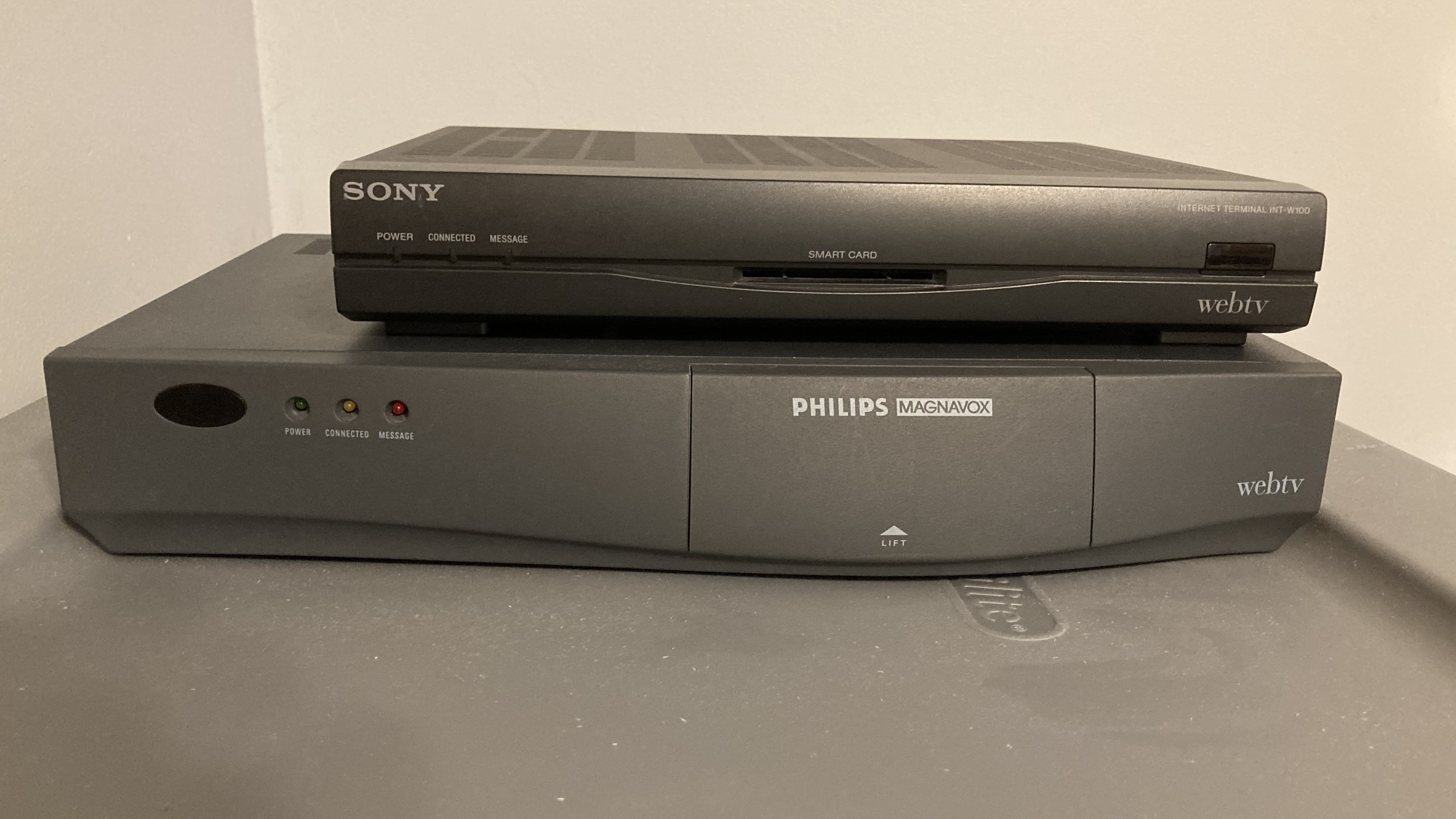
Both WebTV launch units (Philips MAT960 & Sony INT-W100)

WebTV was launched on September 18, 1996, within one year after its first round of financing, with WebTV set-top boxes in stores from Sony and Philips, and WebTV's online service running from servers in its tiny office, still based in the former BMW dealership.

The initial price for the WebTV set-top box was US$349 for the Sony version and US$329 for the Philips version, with a wireless keyboard available for about an extra US$50. The monthly service fee initially was US$19.95 per month for unlimited Web surfing and e-mail.

There was little difference between the first Sony and the Philips WebTV set-top boxes, except for the housing and packaging. The WebTV set-top box had very limited processing and memory resources, housing a 112 MHz R4640 MIPS CPU, 2 megabytes of RAM, 2 megabytes of ROM, and 1 megabyte of Flash memory. The device relied upon a connection through a 33.6 kbit/s dialup modem to connect to the WebTV Service, where powerful servers provide back-end support to the WebTV set-top boxes to provide a full Web-browsing and email experience to the subscribers.

Initial sales were slow. By April 1997, WebTV had only 56,000 subscribers, but the pace of subscriber growth accelerated after that, achieving 150,000 subscribers by Autumn 1997, about 325,000 subscribers by April 1998 and about 800,000 subscribers by May 1999. WebTV achieved profitability by Spring 1998, and grossed over US$1.3 billion in revenue through its first 8 years of operation. In 2005 WebTV was still grossing US$150 million per year in revenue with 65% gross margin.

=== WebTV briefly classified as a weapon ===
Because WebTV utilized strong encryption, specifically the 128-bit encryption (not SSL) used to communicate with its proprietary service, upon launch in 1996, WebTV was classified as "munitions" (a military weapon) by the United States government and was therefore barred from export under United States security laws at the time. Because WebTV was widely distributed in consumer electronic stores under the Sony and Philips brands for only US$325, its munitions classification was used to argue that the US should no longer consider devices incorporating strong encryption to be munitions, and should permit their export. Two years later, in October 1998, WebTV obtained a special exemption permitting its export, despite the strong encryption, and shortly thereafter, laws concerning export of cryptography in the United States were changed to generally permit the export of strong encryption.

=== Microsoft takes notice ===
In February 1997, in an investor meeting with Microsoft, Steve Perlman was approached by Microsoft's Senior Vice President for Consumer Platforms Division, Craig Mundie. Despite the fact that the initial WebTV sales had been modest, Mundie expressed that Microsoft was impressed with WebTV and saw significant potential both in WebTV's product offering and in applying the technology to other Microsoft consumer and video product offerings. Microsoft offered to acquire WebTV, build a Microsoft campus in Silicon Valley around WebTV, and establish WebTV as a Microsoft division to develop television-based products and services, with Perlman as the division's president.

Discussions proceeded rapidly, involving Bill Gates, then CEO of Microsoft, personally. Gates called Perlman at his home on Easter Sunday in March 1997, and Perlman described to Gates WebTV's next generation products in development, which would be the first consumer devices to incorporate hard disks, including the WebTV Plus, and the WebTV Digital Video Recorders. Gates' interest was piqued, and negotiations between Microsoft and WebTV rapidly proceeded to closure, with both sides working around the clock to get the deal done. Negotiation time was so short that the hour lost due to the change to Daylight Saving Time the night before the planned announcement, which the parties had neglected to factor into their schedule, almost left them without enough time to finish the deal.

On April 6, 1997, 20 months after WebTV's founding, and only six weeks after negotiations with Microsoft began, during a scheduled speech at the National Association of Broadcasters conference in Las Vegas, Nevada, Craig Mundie announced that Microsoft had acquired WebTV. The acquisition price was US$503 million, but WebTV was so young a company that most of the employees' stock options had yet to be vested. As such, the vested shares at the time of the announcement amounted to US$425 million, and that was the acquisition price announced. Each of the three founders received $64 million from the sale.

Subsequent to the acquisition, WebTV became a Silicon Valley–based division of Microsoft, with Steve Perlman as its president. The WebTV division began developing most of Microsoft's television-based products, including the first satellite Digital Video Recorders (the DishPlayer for EchoStar's Dish Network and UltimateTV for DirecTV), Microsoft's cable TV products, the Xbox 360 hardware, and Microsoft's Mediaroom IPTV platform.

In May 1999, America Online announced that it was going to compete directly with Microsoft in delivering Internet over television sets by introducing AOL TV.

In June 1999, Steve Perlman left Microsoft and started Rearden, a business incubator for new companies in media and entertainment technology.

=== MSN TV rebranding ===
In July 2001, six years after WebTV's founding, Microsoft rebranded WebTV as MSN TV. Contracts were terminated with all other licensed manufacturers of the WebTV hardware except RCA, leaving them as the sole manufacturer of further hardware. Promotion of the WebTV brand ended.

In later years, the number of consumers using dialup access had dropped and as the Classic and Plus clients were restricted to dialup access, their subscriber count began to drop. Because the WebTV client was subsidized hardware, the company had always required individual subscriptions for each box, but with the subsidies ended, MSN started offering free use of MSN TV boxes to their computer users who subscribed to MSN as an incentive not to depart for discount dialup ISPs.

==== Broadband MSN TV ====
In 2001, Rogers Cable partnered with Microsoft to introduce "Rogers Interactive TV" in Canada. The service enabled Rogers' subscribers to access the Web via their TV sets, create their own websites, shop online, chat, and access e-mail. This initiative was the first broadband implementation of MSN TV.

In late 2004, Microsoft introduced MSN TV 2. Codenamed the "Deuce", it was capable of broadband access, and it introduced a revamped user interface and new capabilities. These include offline viewing of media (so long as a user had already logged in prior), audio and video streaming (broadband only), Adobe Reader, support for viewing Microsoft Office documents (namely Microsoft Word), Windows Media Player, the ability to access Windows computers on a home network to function as a media player, and even the ability the use of a mouse. MSN TV 2 also later introduced features originally seen in the first generation of MSN TV, such as its Beatnik MIDI engine and the ability to play background music while surfing the web. MSN TV 2 used a different online service from the original WebTV/MSN TV, but it offered many of the same services, such as chatrooms, instant messaging, weather, news, aggregated "info centers", and newsgroups, and like that service, still required a subscription to use. For those with broadband, the fee was US$99 yearly.

For inexpensive devices, the cost of licensing the operating system is substantial. For Microsoft, however, it would be actualizing a sunk cost, and when Microsoft released the MSN TV 2 model, they adopted standard PC architecture and used a customized version of Windows CE as the operating system. This allowed MSN TV 2 to more easily and inexpensively keep current.

=== Discontinuation ===
By late 2009, MSN TV hardware was no longer being sold by Microsoft, although service continued for existing users for the next four years. Attempting to go to the "Buy MSN TV" section on the MSN TV website at the time resulted in the following message being shown:

"Sorry, MSN TV hardware is no longer available for purchase from Microsoft. Microsoft continues to support the subscription service for existing WebTV and MSN TV customers."

On July 1, 2013, an email was sent out to subscribers stating that the MSN TV service would be shutting down on September 30, 2013. During that time, subscribers were advised to convert any accounts on the first-generation service to Microsoft accounts and to migrate any favorites and other data they had on their MSN TV accounts to SkyDrive. Once September 30, 2013 finally arrived, the WebTV/MSN TV service fully closed. Existing customers were offered MSN Dial-Up Internet Access accounts with a promotion. Customer service was available for non-technical and billing questions until January 15, 2014.

== Technology ==
=== Set-top box ===
Since the WebTV set-top box was a dedicated web-browsing appliance that did not need to be based on a standard operating system, the cost of licensing one could be avoided. All WebTV and original MSN TV boxes featured a 32-bit MIPS RISC CPU, boot ROM, storage, RAM, and a smart card reader, which was not significantly utilized. The web browser that ran on the set-top boxes was developed in-house, but compatible with both Netscape Navigator and Microsoft Internet Explorer standards. The WebTV set-top boxes leveraged the service's server-side caching proxy which reformatted and compressed web pages before sending them to the box, a feature generally unavailable to dial-up ISP users at the time and as such, had to be developed by WebTV Networks. Given the fact that WebTV's thin client software was stored in non-volatile memory, upgrades could be downloaded from the WebTV service onto set-top boxes over a phone line, as well as over the air via satellite broadcast on satellite units. The set-top boxes were also designed so that at a specified time, it would check to see if there was any email waiting for the user. If there was, it would illuminate a red LED on the front of the box so the consumer would know it was worth connecting to read their email.

The first WebTV Classic set-top boxes from Sony and Philips in 1996 had a 33.6k modem, 2 MB of RAM, 2 MB of boot ROM, and 2 MB of flash ROM. They also contained an ASIC named FIDO, designed by WebTV Networks and manufactured by NEC, which handled graphics processing that was capable of video output to NTSC and, reportedly, PAL, as well as handling system logic for IR and controlling the LEDs on the front of the box. Future models would start using 56k modems and introduce increased RAM and storage capacity.

A second model, the WebTV Plus, was introduced a year after the release of the original boxes. This model featured a TV tuner and composite inputs to allow watching television from the set-top box. The television feed could be viewed in full screen, in a PIP (Picture-In-Picture) window, or used to capture video stills as a JPEG that could then be uploaded to a WebTV/MSN TV discussion post, email, or a "scrapbook" on a user's account for later use. WebTV Plus also allowed one to schedule a VCR in a manner like TiVo allowed several years later. The Plus upgraded to a 167 MHz R4640 processor, included a 56k modem, support for ATVEF, a technology that allowed users to download special script-laden pages to interact with television shows, and in original models, had a Seagate 1.1 GB hard drive for storage in place of the flash memory chips used in the previous Classic models, mainly in order to accommodate large nightly downloads of television schedules. WebTV Plus also introduced a new ASIC into the hardware to allow the new TV-based features to be possible and enhance the set top box's graphical capabilities. Named "Solo", it was announced to have support for 3-D transformations, compositing, on-the-fly image decompression, anti-aliasing, and translucency. The enhanced graphics capabilities of the Solo also allowed WebTV Networks to experiment with the idea of making WebTV Plus a platform for video gaming alongside web browsing, which currently only has confirmation in the form of first hand accounts from people who worked for or collaborated with WebTV Networks to develop games for it, and a leak that occurred in August 1998 where the WebTV hacking scene discovered a games section on an internal WebTV server that offered options to download WebTV Plus ports of Doom and You Don't Know Jack. Two revisions of the Solo ASIC are known to have been used in the WebTV Plus throughout its lifespan: SOLO1 and SOLO3, the latter mainly being used in the New Plus revision of the model.

Around Fall 1998, plans for a "Derby" revision of the WebTV Plus were announced, which was rumored to have a faster CPU and more memory. Circa late 1998 or early 1999, only one Derby unit was produced by Sony as a silent revision of their INT-W200 Plus model, but no substantial changes were made to the hardware outside of the CPU being upgraded with no change in clock speed, and the modem being changed to a softmodem. As chip prices dropped, later versions of the Plus used an M-Systems DiskOnChip flash ROM instead, alongside increasing RAM capacity to 16 MB.

In Japan, WebTV had a small run starting around December 1997, with a couple "Classic" Japanese units being released at launch, which came with hard drives, the same amount of RAM as an Old Plus, and two times more boot ROM than American Classic and Old Plus units. In the Spring of 1999, Japanese WebTV subscribers also had the option of utilizing Sega's Dreamcast video game console, which came with a built-in modem, to access the WebTV service. This was possible as Sega and Microsoft collaborated to create a port of the WebTV technology on the Dreamcast, using the Windows CE abstraction layer supported on the console and what's believed to be a version of the Internet Explorer 2.0 browser engine. The Japanese service ended some time in March 2002.

As an ease-of-use design consideration, WebTV early on decided to reformat pages rather than have users doing sideways scrolling. As entry-level PCs evolved from VGA resolution of 640x480 to SVGA resolution of 800x600, and web site dimensions followed suit, reformatting the PC-sized web pages to fit the 560-pixel width of a United States NTSC television screen became less satisfactory. The WebTV browser also translated HTML frames as tables in order to avoid the need for a mouse. When the MSN TV 2 released, Microsoft had decided to forgo reformatting pages and added sideways scrolling as well as the ability to resize text on web pages with buttons on the MSN TV keyboard.

==== Satellite boxes ====
Starting in the late 90s, WebTV Networks produced reference designs of models incorporating a disk-based personal video recorder and a satellite tuner for EchoStar's Dish Network and for DirecTV. These would be named the DishPlayer and UltimateTV respectively.

DishPlayer launched in late 1999 and was touted as "the world's first interactive satellite TV receiver". The DishPlayer is the first satellite-based DVR from Dish Network, and used a hard disk to allow users to record shows for later viewing. It could simultaneously play back video while recording as well. DishPlayer users could also control playback of programs recorded onto the set top box. DishPlayer made use of software and hardware developed by WebTV Networks to provide the user interface and features. Because of this, it was also capable of connecting to the WebTV Plus service, allowing it to browse the internet, send e-mail, and access other WebTV services. DishPlayer was also the only WebTV-based box to officially have games released for it, which were downloaded and updated over satellite. Three games were offered on the DishPlayer: Doom, You Don't Know Jack (a port of the Netshow version), and Solitaire. Two models of the DishPlayer were released: the 7100 and 7200, which had 8.6 GB and 17.6 GB of hard disk space respectively. EchoStar stopped selling DishPlayer boxes in 2001, but the boxes still worked with Dish Network service well into the mid-2000s.

UltimateTV was a satellite-based DVR made for DirecTV that made use a dual satellite tuner to allow a user to watch or record two shows at once. It would take advantage of new hardware to achieve this, using an upgraded version of the Solo ASIC named SOLO2. This version of the ASIC has the ability to process several video streams at the same time and included a digital-to-analog converter (DAC) to allow digital content to be displayed on analog television sets. While the user interface and internet service for UltimateTV are similar to WebTV/MSN TV's, the UltimateTV software now uses Windows CE as its underlying OS as opposed to a custom one like the standard WebTV and MSN TV firmware used. This Windows CE–based OS would be used as the framework for the original Microsoft TV platform. In 2001, EchoStar sued Microsoft for failing to support the WebTV DishPlayer. EchoStar subsequently sought to acquire DirecTV and was the presumptive acquirer, but EchoStar was ultimately blocked by the Federal Communications Commission. While EchoStar's lawsuit against Microsoft was in process, DirecTV (presumptively acquired and controlled by EchoStar) dropped UltimateTV (thus ending Microsoft's satellite product initiatives) and picked TiVo's DirecTV product as its only Digital Video Recorder offering.

=== Security ===
Hackers eventually figured out ways to exploit the service's security with vulnerable URLs, resulting in access to internal sections of the production WebTV service such as "Tricks," which hosted several pages designed to troubleshoot the WebTV box and service; the ability to remotely change the settings of a subscriber's box; or even remotely performing actions on any account, including deleting them, which the service did not verify on whether the requests were coming from the account holder or not. Hackers also found a way to connect to internal WebTV services and discovered WebTV content that was previously unknown to the public, including a version of Doom for WebTV Plus units that could be downloaded from one of these services at one point.

WebTV/MSN TV was also victim to a virus written in July 2002 by 43 year old David Jeansonne, which changed the local dial-up access number on victims' boxes to 911. This number would be dialled the next time the WebTV/MSN TV box had to dial in. It was sent to 18 MSN TV users through an attachment in an email, and disguised itself by showing an interface for a "tool" that could change the colors and fonts of the MSN TV user interface. It was supposedly forwarded to 3 other users by some of the initial victims, making the total victim count 21. At least 10 of the victims reported having the police show up at their homes as a result of their boxes dialing 911. There are also claims of the virus having the ability to mass-mail itself, although this was not properly confirmed at the time the virus was prevalent. Jeansonne was eventually arrested in February 2004, and pled guilty on the charges of intentionally causing damage to computers and causing a threat to public safety. He was subsequently sentenced to serve six months in prison, followed by six months of home detention, as well as paying restitution to Microsoft.

=== Protocols ===
With the first generation of the WebTV/MSN TV service, the main protocol used for the majority of service communication was WTVP, or the WebTV Protocol. WTVP is a TCP-based protocol that is essentially a proprietary version of HTTP 1.0 with the ability to serve both standard web content and specialized service content to WebTV/MSN TV users. It also introduced its own protocol extensions, which include but aren't limited to 128-bit RC4-based message encryption, ticket-based authorization, proprietary challenge–response authentication to both verify clients logging in to the service and to supply them session keys used for message encryption, and persistent connections. This protocol was supported by all WebTV and original MSN TV clients and the Sega Dreamcast release of WebTV up until the September 2013 discontinuation of the entire service (March 2002 for those in Japan).

Another protocol used by the original service is dubbed "Mail Notify", a UDP-based protocol that would track online clients and send periodic datagrams directly to clients to notify them of new e-mail. Its existence has only been confirmed in a leaked Microsoft document.

== WebTV/MSN TV client hardware ==
=== Models ===
==== Confirmed ====
Brand	Model	Type	Connectivity	RAM	ROM	Storage	CPU	Latest Firmware Version	Notes
Sony	INT-W100	Classic	V.34 modem	2 MB	2 MB	2 MB (Flash ROM)	R4640 @ 112 MHz	2.5.9.1mpeg 2.5.9.1print	Model originally used R4640 CPU from IDT. By late 1998, WebTV switched CPU manufacturers for the Classic from IDT to NKK.
Philips Magnavox	MAT960	Classic	V.34 modem	2 MB	2 MB	2 MB (Flash ROM)	R4640 @ 112 MHz	2.5.9.1mpeg 2.5.9.1print	Model originally used R4640 CPU from IDT. By late 1998, WebTV switched CPU manufacturers for the Classic from IDT to NKK.
Sony	INT-W200	Plus	V.90 modem	8 MB	2 MB	1.1 GB (HDD)	R4640 @ 167 MHz	2.9.1	
Philips Magnavox	MAT972	Plus	V.90 modem	8 MB	2 MB	1.1 GB (HDD)	R4640 @ 167 MHz	2.9.1	Believed to have had a Derby (softmodem) revision made around 1998
Samsung	SIS-100	Plus	V.90	8 MB	2 MB	1.1 GB (HDD)	R4640 @ 167 MHz	2.9.1	
Mitsubishi	WB-2000	Plus	V.90	8 MB	2 MB	1.1 GB (HDD)	R4640 @ 167 MHz(?)	2.9.1	
Sony	INT-WJ200	Classic (Japan)	V.90	8 MB	4 MB	1.1 GB (HDD)	R4640 @ 167 MHz	???	Has an extra set of composite inputs, but its purpose is unknown as stock firmware does not have the TV Home screen
Fujitsu	F993000	Possibly Classic model (contains hard drive)	???	???	???	???	???	???	Has an extra set of composite inputs
Panasonic (Matsushita)	TU-WE100	Plus (Japan)	V.90 modem	16 MB	4 MB	1.1 GB (HDD)	RM5230 @ 167 MHz	???	Used a Seagate ST31013A hard drive
Sony	INT-W200	Derby Plus	V.90 softmodem	8 MB	2 MB	1.1 GB (HDD)	RM5230 @ 167 MHz	2.9.1	The Derby revision of INT-W200 was quietly released circa late 1998, with the only major difference from the original revision being its use of a softmodem in place of a hardware modem. To determine if an INT-W200 box is a Derby model, the CPU should be an RM5230 and the technical information screen on the box will report a softmodem
Echostar	DishPlayer 7100	DISH tuner	V.90 softmodem	16 MB	4 MB	8.6 GB	RM5230 @ 167 MHz		
Echostar	DishPlayer 7200	DISH tuner	V.90 softmodem	16 MB	4 MB	17.6 GB	RM5230 @ 167 MHz		
Sony	INT-WJ300	Plus (Japan)	V.90	8 MB	4 MB	1.08 GB (HDD)	RM5230(?) @ 167 MHz	???	
Sony	INT-W150	New Classic	V.90 softmodem	8 MB	2 MB	2 MB(?) (DiskOnChip)	R5230 @ 150 MHz	2.9.1	
Philips Magnavox	MAT965	New Classic	V.90 softmodem	8 MB	2 MB	2 MB(?) (DiskOnChip)	RM5230 @ 150 MHz	2.9.1	
RCA	RW2100	New Classic	V.90 softmodem	8 MB	2 MB	2 MB(?) (DiskOnChip)	R5230 @ 150 MHz	2.9.1	
RCA	RW2110	New Plus	V.90 softmodem	16 MB	2 MB	8 MB(?) (DiskOnChip)	R5230 @ 167 MHz	2.9.1	
Sony	INT-W250	New Plus	V.90 softmodem	16 MB	2 MB	8 MB(?) (DiskOnChip)	R5230 @ 167 MHz	2.9.1	
Philips Magnavox	MAT976	New Plus	V.90 softmodem	16 MB	2 MB	8 MB(?) (DiskOnChip)	RM5230 @ 167 MHz	2.9.1	
RCA	RM2100	MSN TV (New Classic)	V.90 softmodem	8 MB	2 MB	4 MB(?) (DiskOnChip)	RM5230 @ 150 MHz	2.9.1	
RCA	DWD490RE	UltimateTV	V.90 softmodem	32 MB	2 MB	40 GB (HDD)	RM5231 @ 250 MHz		
RCA	DWD495RG	UltimateTV	???	???	???	80 GB (HDD)	???		
Sony	SAT-W60	UltimateTV	V.90 softmodem	32 MB	2 MB	40 GB (HDD)	RM5231 @ 250 MHz		
RCA	RM4100	MSN TV 2	V.90, Ethernet, Wi-Fi (via supported USB wireless adapters)	128 MB	???	64 MB (CompactFlash)	Intel Celeron @ 733 MHz	5.6.7021.0	
KVH Industries	TracNet 100	MSN TV 2	EVDO	???	???	???	???		

==== Not Confirmed ====
Brand	Model	Type	Connectivity	RAM	ROM	Storage	CPU speed	CPU	Latest Firmware Version	Notes
Mitsubishi	WB-2001	Plus	V.90	8 MB	2 MB	1.1 GB (HDD)	167 MHz	R4640	2.9.1	Listed on official Microsoft WebTV site in 2000, but no substantial evidence confirming its existence is currently available.
RCA	RM4100 (2)	MSN TV 2	V.90/Ethernet	256 MB	???	???	733 MHz	Celeron		

=== Hacking attempts ===
In February 2006, Chris Wade analyzed the proprietary BIOS of the MSN TV 2 set top box, and created a sophisticated memory patch which allowed it to be flashed and used to boot Linux on it. An open-source solution to enabling TV output on the MSN TV 2 and similar devices was made available in 2009. There were also recorded attempts to make use of unused IDE pins on the MSN TV 2's motherboard and supply a hard drive, most likely to add extra storage beyond the 64 MB given by the default CompactFlash storage.

== See also ==
- Microsoft Venus
- Set-top box
- SmartTV
- AOL TV
- Google TV (smart TV platform)
- Caldera DR-WebSpyder
