= Antonio Rodriguez (entrepreneur) =

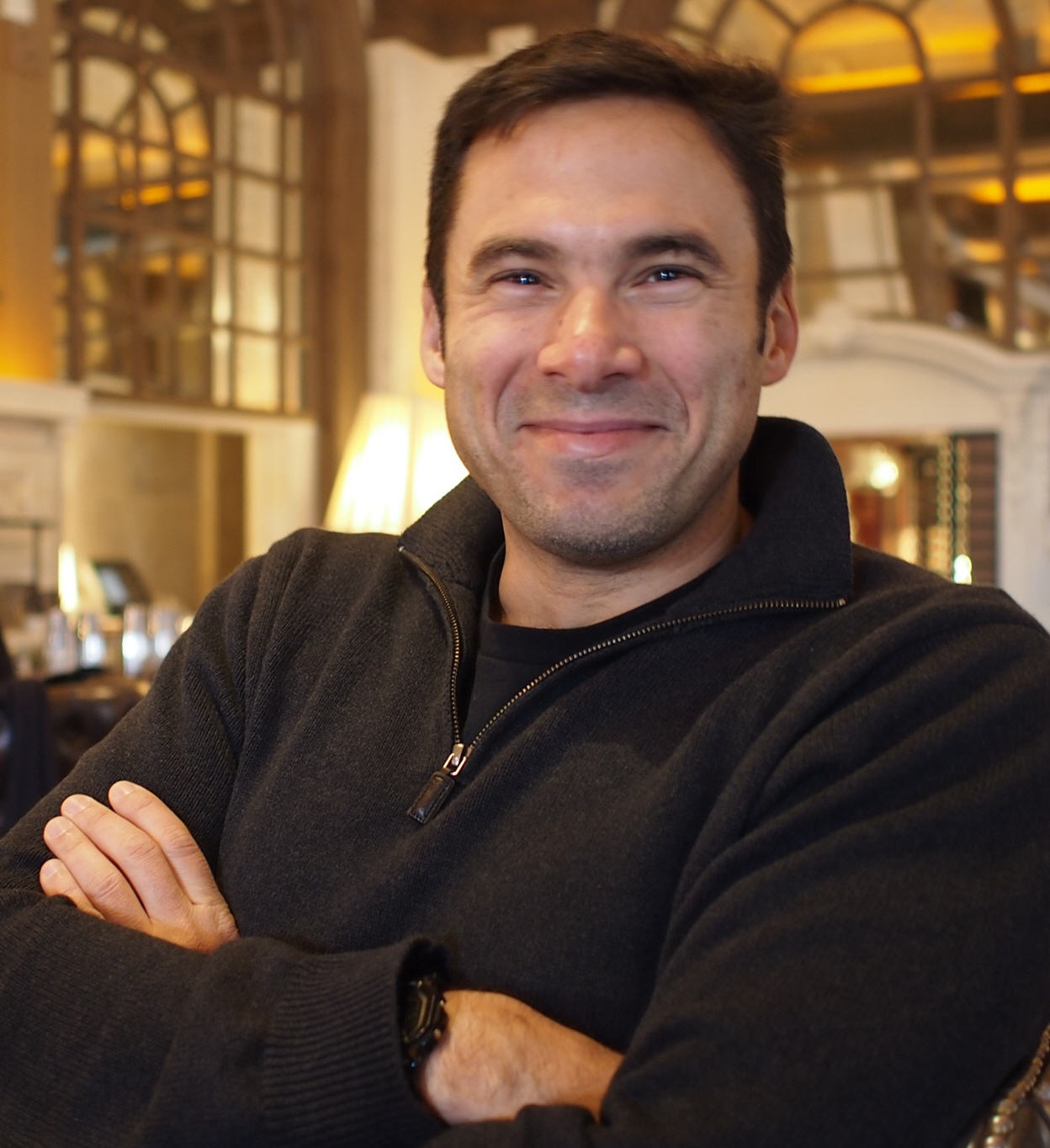
- Rodriguez in 2013
- Born: Venezuela
- Education: Harvard University; Stanford University
- Occupations: entrepreneur; executive; venture capitalist
- Website: an.ton.io

Antonio Rodriguez is a serial entrepreneur and venture capitalist.

== Early life and education ==
Rodriguez was born in Venezuela. At the age of nine, he learned to program on an Apple II. He graduated with honors from Harvard University with an A.B. in Social Studies in 1996. After working for two years, he returned to university to complete an MBA at Stanford University Graduate School of Business from 1998 to 2000.

== Career ==
After a job with Boston Consulting Group, Rodriguez worked at Abuzz Technologies, a social Q&A site that was founded by his brother, Andres, and acquired by The New York Times in 1999.

In 2000, he founded a company, Memora, with his brother. The company built and sold a home server called Servio. In 2001, the company closed due to the bursting of the dot-com bubble. Rodriguez then moved to New York to join MyPublisher (now part of Shutterfly), a photo book manufacturer.

In 2005, he founded, and was CEO of, Tabblo, a photo storyboarding website and printing company. It was acquired by Hewlett-Packard in 2007. After the acquisition, he became CTO of HP's consumer printing group.

In 2010, Rodriguez joined Matrix Partners as a general partner. His investments there include Sold (acquired by Dropbox in 2013), Oculus VR (acquired by Facebook), and Suno in 2024.

== Personal life ==
Rodriguez is married and has two sons.
