= Andy Rubin =

American businessman (born 1963)

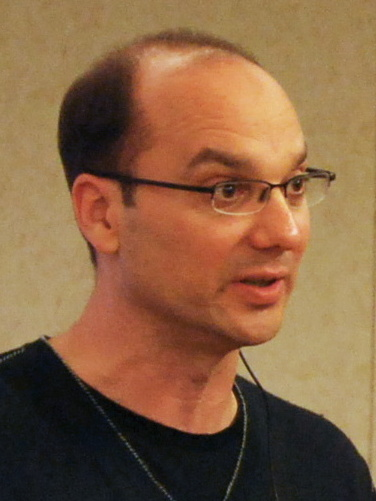
- Rubin in 2008
- Born: Andrew E. Rubin; March 13, 1963 (age 63); Chappaqua, New York
- Education: Utica College
- Occupation: Partner at Redpoint Ventures
- Known for: Android
- Spouse: Rie Hirabaru (divorced)

Andrew E. Rubin (born March 13, 1963) is an American computer programmer, entrepreneur, and venture capitalist. Rubin founded Danger Inc. in 1999 and left in 2003; Danger was eventually acquired by Microsoft in 2008. Rubin founded Android Inc. in 2003, which was acquired by Google in 2005; Rubin served as a Google vice president for nine years and led Google's efforts in creating and promoting the Android operating system for mobile phones and other devices during most of his tenure. Rubin left Google in 2014, initially presented as a voluntary departure; but later revealed to be a dismissal due to allegations of sexual harassment by Rubin. Rubin then served as co-founder and CEO of venture capital firm Playground Global from 2015 to 2019. Rubin also helped found Essential Products in 2015, a mobile phone start-up that closed in 2020 without finding a buyer. In 2019, Rubin was inducted into the Wireless Hall of Fame.

== Early life and education ==
Rubin grew up in Chappaqua, New York. He is of Jewish heritage. He is the son of a psychologist who later founded his own direct-marketing firm that created photographs of the latest electronic gadgets to be sent with credit card bills. He attended Horace Greeley High School in Chappaqua, New York from 1977 until 1981 and was awarded a Bachelor of Science degree in computer science from Utica College, Utica, New York, in 1986.

== Career ==
Andy Rubin worked at Apple from 1989 to 1992 as a manufacturing engineer. Rubin was nicknamed "Android" by his co-workers at Apple in 1989 due to a love of robots, with the nickname eventually becoming the official name of the Android operating system.

=== General Magic ===
Rubin joined General Magic in 1992. He was a lead engineer in the development of the Motorola Envoy.

=== Danger ===
Rubin cofounded Danger, Inc. in 1999, and served as its CEO under which he designed and released the Hiptop mobile Internet communicator and cell phone aimed at young adults. More popularly known as T-Mobile Sidekick (due to partnership with carrier T-Mobile US), the device achieved cult popularity. Shortly after the Hiptop's launch, Rubin's CEO role was replaced and he remained solely as president and chief strategy officer. He left the company in early 2004 for his next startup, Android, Inc.

=== Google ===
After Android was acquired by Google in 2005, Rubin became the company's senior vice president of mobile and digital content, where he oversaw development of Android, an open-source operating system for smartphones.

On March 13, 2013, Larry Page announced in a blog post that Rubin had moved from the Android division to take on new projects at Google, with Sundar Pichai taking over Android. In December 2013, Rubin started management of the robotics division of Google (including companies such as Boston Dynamics, which Google owned at the time). On October 31, 2014, Rubin left Google after nine years at the company to start a venture capital firm for technology startups.

==== Sexual harassment allegations ====
According to The New York Times, while the departure was presented to the media as an amicable one where Rubin would spend more time on philanthropy and start-ups, CEO Larry Page personally asked for Rubin's resignation after a sexual harassment claim by an employee against Rubin was found to be credible during an investigation by Google. The employee, with whom Rubin had an extramarital relationship, accused him of coercing her into oral sex in a hotel room in 2013. Rubin strongly disputed these reports and denied wrongdoing, stating, "these false allegations are part of a smear campaign to disparage me during a divorce and custody battle." Page ultimately decided that Rubin would have to leave due to the inappropriate relationship.

Rubin had considerable leverage in negotiating his exit, due to his position as a senior executive as well as recently receiving a $150 million stock grant from the board of directors for his past work on Android. If Rubin filed a wrongful termination lawsuit this would have meant unwanted press attention for Google and the victims of the misconduct, and losing such a lawsuit would result in Google being liable for significant damages. Since Rubin would have still been highly sought after as a technology visionary, Google included a non-compete clause in his severance agreement and also invested in his next venture.

The incident, among others, led to the 2018 Google walkouts from Google's employee workforce over Rubin reportedly receiving a $90 million "exit package" to expedite his separation from the company. Google responded by sending a memo to employees saying no employees dismissed due to sexual harassment concerns after 2016 had received payouts.

=== After Google ===
After being forced out of Google, Rubin founded Playground Global in 2015 along with Peter Barrett, Matt Hershenson and Bruce Leak. The company is a venture capital firm and studio for technology start-ups, providing funding, resources, and mentorship. In 2015, Playground Global raised a $300 million fund from investors including Google, HP, Foxconn, Redpoint Ventures, Seagate Technology and Tencent, among others. It has invested in several companies such as Owl Labs. Rubin left Playground Global in May 2019.

Rubin eventually joined and helped create the Android phone start-up Essential Products. In November 2017, he took a leave of absence from Essential Products after reports of the inappropriate relationship from his time at Google surfaced. In December 2017, he returned to Essential Products.

Rubin and his ex-wife, Rie Hirabaru Rubin, owned and operated Voyageur du Temps, a bakery and cafe in Los Altos, California, which closed in September 2018.

=== Timeline ===
- Carl Zeiss AG, robotics engineer, 1986–1989.
- Apple Inc., manufacturing engineer, 1989–1992.
- General Magic, engineer, 1992–1995. An Apple spin-off where he participated in developing Magic Cap, an operating system and interface for hand-held mobile devices.
- MSN TV, engineer, 1995–1999. When Magic Cap failed, Rubin joined Artemis Research, founded by Steve Perlman, which became WebTV and was eventually acquired by Microsoft.
- Danger Inc., co-founder, 1999–2003. Founded with Matt Hershenson and Joe Britt. The firm is most notable for the Danger Hiptop, branded for T-Mobile as the Sidekick, which is a phone with PDA-like abilities. The firm was later acquired by Microsoft in February 2008.
- Android Inc., co-founder 2003–2005. Android was acquired by Google in 2005.
- Google, 2005–2014: Senior Vice President in charge of Android for most of his tenure. Since December 2013, managing the robotics division of Google (which included companies bought by Google, such as Boston Dynamics).
- Playground Global, 2014–2019: Founder. This ventures focuses on artificial intelligence and it is creating new generations of hardware.
- Redpoint Ventures, 2015–2017: Partner.
- Essential Products, 2015–2020: Founder and lead. Rubin launched the Essential phone through this company in late June 2017. On February 12, 2020, Essential announced in an update on their blog that the company was ceasing operations.
