= Danger, Inc. =

Former US mobile hardware and software company

- Type: Subsidiary
- Industry: Software, services
- Founded: December 9, 1999; 26 years ago
- Founders: Andy Rubin; Joe Britt; Matt Hershenson
- Defunct: c. 2011
- Fate: Merged with Microsoft
- Successor: Microsoft Mobile
- Headquarters: Palo Alto, California, US
- Key people: Andy Rubin (CEO); Matías Duarte (director of design)
- Parent: Microsoft
- Website: www.danger.com at the Wayback Machine (archived April 26, 2011)

Danger, Inc. was an American company specializing in hardware design, software, and services for mobile computing devices. Founded on December 9, 1999, its most notable product was the T-Mobile Sidekick (also known as Danger Hiptop), a popular early smartphone. The Sidekick or Hiptop was an early example of client–server ("cloud"-based) smartphones and created the App (Applications) marketplace, later popularized by Android and iOS. Danger was acquired by Microsoft on February 11, 2008, for a price rumored to be around $500 million.

== History ==
The company was originally started by former Apple Inc., WebTV and Philips employees Andy Rubin, Joe Britt, and Matt Hershenson. Before introducing the official Hiptop product, the company operated under the stealth name, "Danger Research."

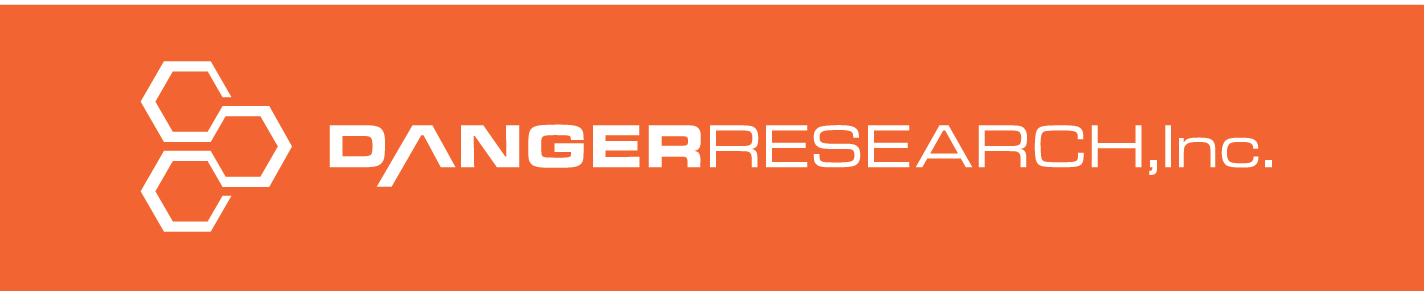
Original stealth logo of Danger Research Inc.

The company was originally developed to take advantage of the fledgling GPRS data network with the encouragement of various carriers such as Cingular. The first device developed did not have a swivel screen and the prototype was called "Navi" and only used the low bandwidth data network. Potential carriers and venture capital investors insisted the device also have a traditional phone radio as well which was added later to the operating system. Since the device ID was designed as data-only read/write this posed some awkward interface challenges for the UX team.

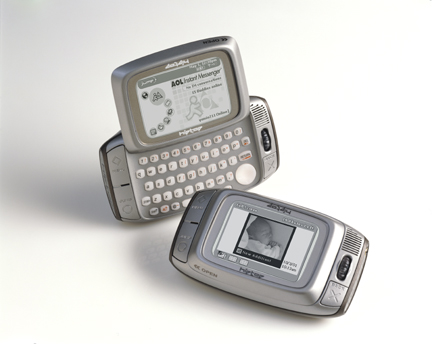
Original Device was black and white and used the 2G/GPRS data network

T-Mobile USA was the first carrier to offer the Hiptop under the name, "T-Mobile Sidekick." The device had a guerrilla marketing plan. Danger and T-Mobile would approach or be approached by sports and Hollywood stars who then, with complimentary service and devices, "influence" youth buyers of the new device.

Co-founder Andy Rubin left in 2003 (pushed out by the CEO and board) to create the company Android, which was later acquired by Google.

After the Microsoft acquisition in 2008, the former Danger staff were absorbed into the Mobile Communications Business (MCB) of the Microsoft Entertainment and Devices Division, where they worked on a future mobile phone platform known as "Project Pink" which would eventually be released as Kin. This line of mobile phones was a commercial failure, and production was ceased just a few weeks after its release. The Kin development team was folded into the Windows Phone team, and Microsoft stopped promoting the devices.

By October 2009, most of the ex-Danger employees had left Microsoft. Until March 2013, Rubin headed Android development, and brought former Danger Director of Design Matias Duarte to Google.

The Register described the Microsoft acquisition as "a classic case of M & A failure, where the acquirer has failed to integrate either the technology or the people from the company that it bought." Later on September 3, 2013, Microsoft purchased Nokia's mobile phone business, which is also seen as a failure.

=== October 2009 data loss ===
On October 12, 2009, a server malfunction or technician error at Danger's data centers resulted in the loss of all Sidekick user data. As Sidekick phones store users' data on Danger's servers—versus using local storage—users lost contact directories, calendars, photos, and all other media not locally backed up. Local backup could be accomplished through an app ($9.99 USD) which synchronized contacts, calendar, and tasks, between the web and a local Windows PC. Notes could not be backed up, however; on October 10, 2009, T-Mobile sent a letter to its subscribers, informing that Microsoft expressed its doubt that any data would be recovered.

The customer's data that was lost was, at the time, being hosted in Microsoft's data centers. Some media reports have suggested that Microsoft hired Hitachi to perform an upgrade to its storage area network (SAN), when something went wrong, resulting in data destruction. Microsoft did not have an active backup of the data and it had to be restored from a month-old copy of the server data, totalling 800GB in size, from offsite backup tapes. The entire restoration of data took over two months for customer data and full functionality to be restored.

The Danger/Sidekick episode is one in a series of cloud computing mishaps that have raised questions about the reliability of such offerings.
