= Steve Perlman (entrepreneur) =

Entrepreneur

- Born: Stephen G. Perlman
- Education: Columbia University (BA)
- Occupations: Electronic engineer and software inventor and entrepreneur
- Known for: QuickTime, WebTV, pCell, OnLive, Mova

Stephen G. "Steve" Perlman is an entrepreneur and inventor of Internet, entertainment, multimedia, consumer electronics and communications technologies and services. He is best known for the development of QuickTime, WebTV, OnLive, pCell and Mova Contour facial capture technologies. In addition to founding startup companies, Perlman was a Microsoft division president and a principal scientist at Apple Computer.

While a prolific entrepreneur, his management style has sometimes been called into question.

== Biography ==
Perlman built his first computer from a kit during high school in 1976. He designed and built several computers, graphics video systems, modems, displays, audio systems, interface devices and video games, as well as software. He graduated from Columbia University in 1983.

In 1983 and 1984, Perlman designed a parallel-processing graphics system at Atari. At Coleco, Perlman developed a massively-parallel 3D animation chip and a software-based high-speed modem. In 1985 Perlman joined Apple Computer on the development team of some Macintosh multimedia technology including Road pizza, the video codec used by the first version of QuickTime.

In 1990, Perlman left Apple to join General Magic, where he designed its second-generation technology.

In 1994, Perlman cofounded Catapult Entertainment and was its Chief technology officer. Catapult developed XBAND modems for the Sega Genesis and Super Nintendo Entertainment System video game consoles that enabled online features for multiplayer video games.

In 1995, Perlman created, cofounded, and was the chief executive of WebTV Networks. WebTV, introduced in 1996, was one of the earliest products to connect the Internet to television. Less than 2 years after it was founded, WebTV was acquired by Microsoft Corporation for $425 million, and renamed as MSN TV. Microsoft's acquisition of WebTV also brought the teams that created the Microsoft TV platforms, including the hardware for Microsoft's Xbox 360.

Perlman left Microsoft in 1999 to found Rearden Steel, later renamed Rearden, Limited, a business incubator for new companies in media and entertainment technology. In 2001, Rearden Steel raised $67 million in venture funding. In 2000, Rearden founded Moxi Digital, Inc., which developed a combination digital video recorder, DVD player, digital music jukebox, and television set-top box. Moxi merged with Microsoft founder Paul Allen's Digeo in 2002.

In 2004, Rearden founded MOVA, which was spun off from Rearden in 2007 as an OnLive subsidiary. MOVA offers motion-capture services in the San Francisco Bay Area, with Perlman as its president. In 2006 Perlman unveiled Mova's Contour, a digital multi-camera system that captures and tracks detailed surface data and textures for post-production manipulation. It was used for 3D volumetric shape capture of Brad Pitt's face in the film The Curious Case of Benjamin Button, which received the 2008 Academy Award for Achievement in Visual Effects for the photorealism achieved in computer-generated reverse-aging of Brad Pitt's face.

In 2007, Rearden spun-out OnLive, which in 2009 announced the OnLive on-demand video game service and MicroConsole TV adapter, with Perlman as its president and CEO. The game service started in June, 2010 in the US and September 22, 2011 in the UK. It was initially offered on the PC, Macintosh and TV via OnLive's MicroConsole, and then on other devices. By December 2011, OnLive's catalog had grown to over 30 games, with about 3 games supporting touchscreen control. In August 2012, OnLive filed for bankruptcy and was sold to one of its investors and Perlman left the company under allegations that his ego had prevented a successful exit for the company.

In 2011, Perlman announced that he and colleagues in a company called Artemis Networks invented an experimental wireless communications system. In early 2014, Perlman launched his Distributed-Input-Distributed-Output (DIDO) technology commercially as Artemis Networks's pCell, promising much higher speeds than existing 4G mobile networks are capable of. The company claimed it could also transmit power.
