= Museum of American Heritage =

American history house museum in Palo Alto, California, U.S.

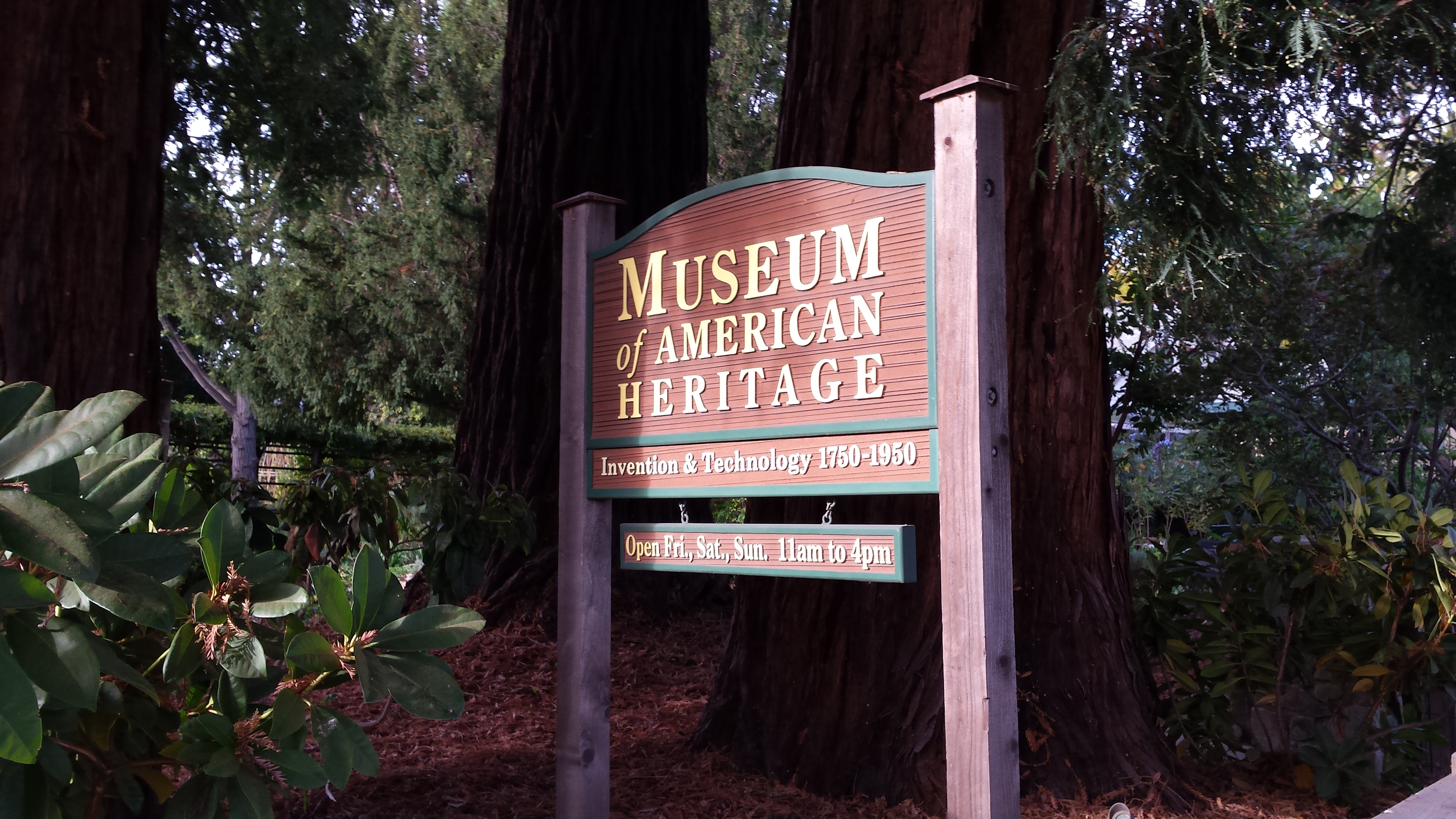
- Established: 1985
- Location: 351 Homer Avenue; Palo Alto, California
- Coordinates: 37.444411°N 122.157543°W
- Visitors: 8,000+
- Director: Dr. Lauren Adams
- Website: www.moah.org

The Museum of American Heritage (MOAH) is a museum in Palo Alto, California. It is dedicated to the preservation and display of mechanical, electrical, and technological artifacts from the Civil War era through the mid-20th century, with a focus on innovations that transformed American life before the digital age. The museum is housed in the historic Tudor Revival home of Dr. Thomas Marion Williams at 351 Homer Avenue, Palo Alto, and uses the property itself as an artifact in telling the story of American technological change. MOAH is a 501(c)(3) nonprofit organization and a member of the American Alliance of Museums.

== History ==
=== Founding ===
The Museum of American Heritage grew out of the private collection of Frank Livermore (1919–2000), a Menlo Park accountant. In the early 1960s, Livermore purchased a vintage Standard vacuum sweeper from a local junk shop, which sparked a decades-long interest in collecting vintage mechanical, electrical, and technological objects. Over the following 20 years, his home collection grew substantially. When a friend gave him a plaque reading "Smithsonian West," he began to seriously consider establishing a formal museum. With funding from a stock sale and the assistance of his friend and attorney Perry Moerdyke, Livermore incorporated the museum in 1985. For its first several years, MOAH collected and catalogued artifacts and presented portable exhibits at temporary locations. The museum opened to the public on September 20, 1990, at 275 Alma Street in Palo Alto. From 1995 through 1998, it occupied a former BMW dealership at 3401 El Camino Real in Palo Alto. In 1994, the City of Palo Alto awarded MOAH stewardship of the historic Williams home at 351 Homer Avenue, and the museum opened there to the public in 1998 following restoration of the house and garden and construction of the Frank Livermore Learning Center. At the time of his death, the Livermore Collection consisted of approximately 1,000 artifacts, with a trust established to preserve and display them publicly.

== Mission and Collection ==
MOAH's mission is to collect, preserve, and exhibit tools and technologies of the 19th and 20th centuries, educating Bay Area communities about the inventions that brought America into the modern era. The museum frames its collection around the arc of American technological transformation—from the telegraph to the telephone, from the first transcontinental railroad to the Moon landing. The museum uses the Williams House itself as a primary interpretive artifact, reconstructing how technology changed American domestic and civic life before the digital age.

=== Community Partnerships ===
MOAH hosts a number of recurring annual community events, including the Vintage Vehicle Family Festival held during Palo Alto's May Fete celebration, the Bay Area Lego Users Group (BayLUG) Winter Lego Show, and seasonal concerts.

== Exhibits ==
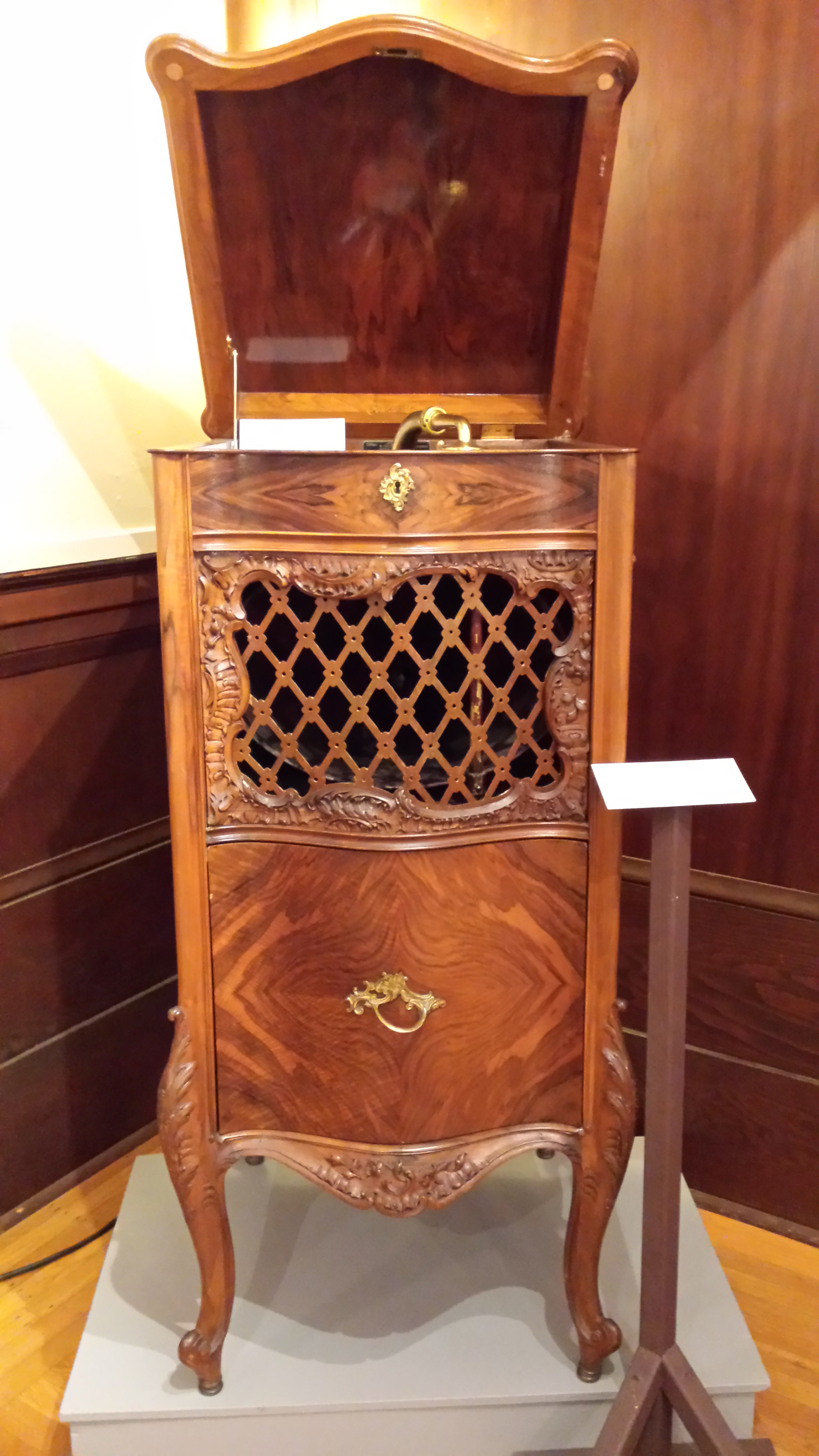
Edison Louis XV brand phonograph. According to the placard, only 60 were made and cost US$425 in 1912.

Five rooms contain rotating exhibits that change several times per year. Exhibits contain artifacts selected from the museum collection and/or from local collectors. Prior exhibits include:

- Honoring 35 Years of Collectors (April 2025 - September 2025)
- Just for the Record: Classic Players and Phonographs (September 2024 - March 2025)
- Threading the Past: History of Clothing Technology (April 2024 - September 2024)
- Aesthetics and Technology: The Jim Adams Collection (October 2023 - March 2024)
- Around the World: A Collection of Vintage Global Artifacts (October 2022 - February 2023)
- Hot Stuff and Cool Ideas: Vintage Heating and Cooling Inventions (March 2022 - August 2022)
- Let Us Entertain You: Amusement from Earlier Eras (September 2021 - February 2022)
- Frank's Cabinet of Curiosities: Celebrating 30 Years (March 2020 - August 8, 2021)
- Cointraptions: Classic Coin-Operated Machines (September 20, 2019 - February 16, 2020)
- The Happy Homemaker: History of Household Appliances (March 22, 2019 - August 18, 2019)
- Vintage Toys: It's Child's Play! (September 28, 2018 - February 17, 2019)
- In the Groove: A History of Record Players (March 23, 2018 - August 19, 2018)
- Thomas Edison and His Rivals: Bringing Electricity to America (Fall 2017: September 22, 2017 - February 18, 2018)
- Open for Business: Office Success Before Computers (March 24, 2017 to August 20, 2017)
- The Evolution of Film (September 2016 - February 2017)
- Pinball! An Exhibition of Vintage Pinball Machines (February 19, 2016 - August 21, 2016)
- 25 Years of the Museum of American Heritage: A Retrospective (April 2015 - January 2016)
- Museum of American Heritage A to Z (October 2015 - March 2015)
- Time Machines: Clocks & Timekeeping (April 2014 to September 2014)
- Television, A History (Fall, 2013)
- Inventing the 20th Century (Summer, 2012)
- Antique Toys, 1870-1930 (Winter, 2010)

Permanent exhibits in six rooms of the Williams House include:

- An early 20th Century Kitchen
- A 1920s General Store displaying the contents from a single Chicago store
- Functioning Print Shop with 4 letterpress printers and one Intertype printer (Intertype Corporation)
- Early Automobile Garage and Workshop

== Collection ==
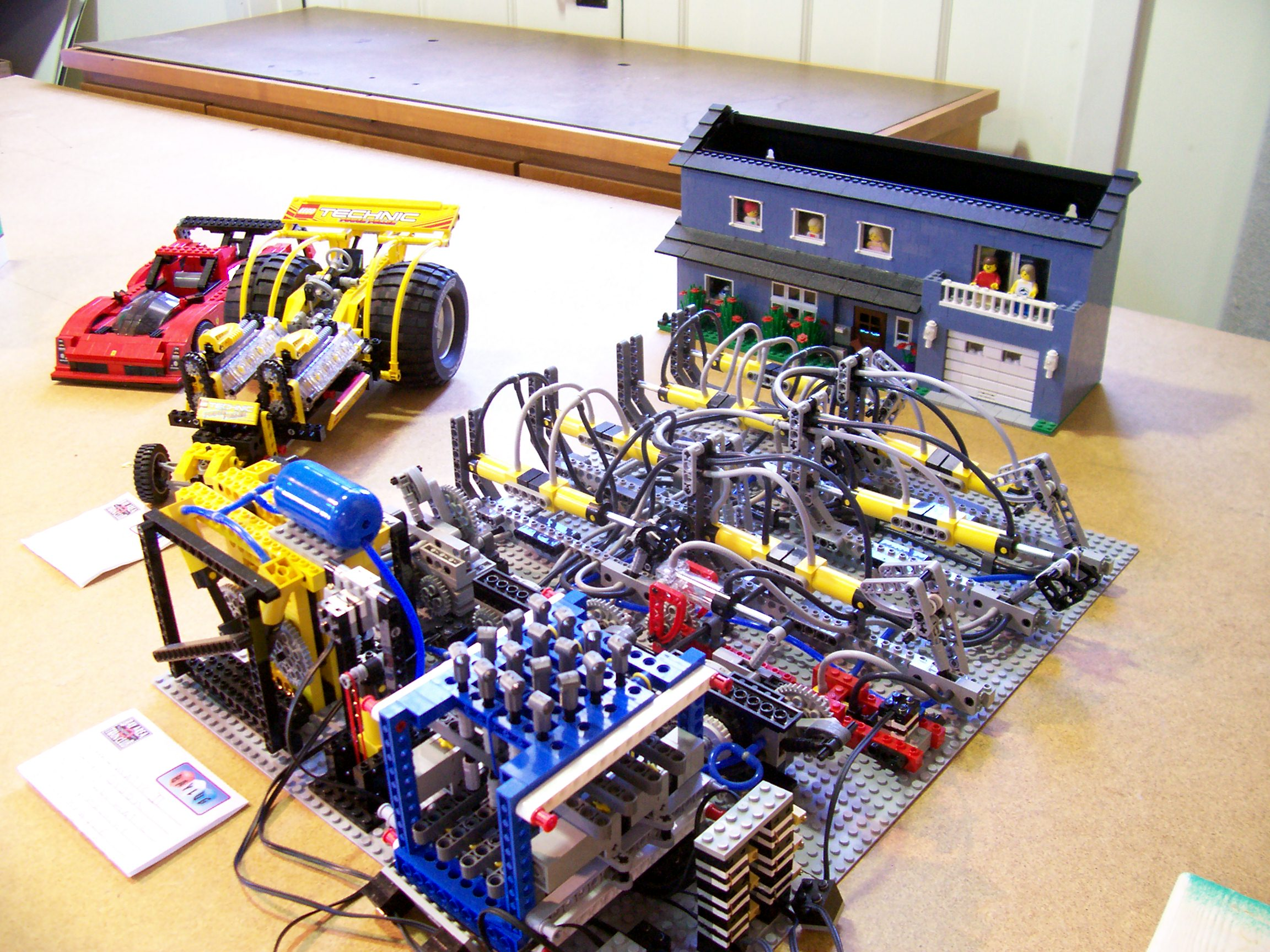
Adding machine constructed from Lego pneumatics by a member of the Bay Area LEGO Users Group

The museum has a mission to collect and preserve artifacts, electrical and mechanical in nature, that were invented or built from the 1750s through to the end of the 1950s. The museum accepts donated artifacts that meet these criteria for inclusion in the collection. The MOAH collection is housed in a remote warehouse and is seldom open to the public. Categories typical to the collection include: sewing machines, mechanical typewriters, cameras, radios and televisions, clocks, toys, adding machines and mechanical calculators, and kitchen appliances. There are over 8,000 accessioned artifacts in the collection and many more that are display items, extras, or permanent loan items. It is reported to be one of the largest collections of its kind in the United States. Items from the collection are used for MOAH permanent and rotating exhibits. Other museums and institutions are able to borrow items from the MOAH collection for their exhibits or other displays. Organizations that have borrowed exhibit materials from MOAH include the San Francisco International Airport museum, the Los Altos History Museum, History San Jose, and Rengstorff House. The museum collection database is currently publicly accessible on the museum's webpage.

== The Williams House ==
=== Former home of Dr. Thomas Williams ===
The Museum of American Heritage is currently open to the public in the Williams House on Homer Avenue in Palo Alto. The home was designed by noted Bay Area architect Ernest Coxhead and completed in 1907 at a cost of $6,000 for Dr. Thomas Marion Williams, his wife Dora Moody Williams, and their daughters Betty (Elizabeth) and Rhona. Dr. Williams, known colloquially as "Dr. Tom," is noted for having opened the first doctor's office in the Palo Alto area, which eventually grew to become the Palo Alto Medical Clinic. The house is a Tudor Revival design with Craftsman interiors, an open floor plan, and a medical wing, and together with its garden occupies approximately two-thirds of an acre. Dr. Tom and Dora were prominent figures in the Palo Alto and Stanford communities, active in the economic and cultural life of the Peninsula. Their daughters lived together and split their time between the Palo Alto home and the family's La Honda ranch. The house was owned by the Williams family until the death of the last surviving daughter, Rhona Williams, in 1989, who bequeathed the home and garden to the City of Palo Alto with the proviso that the property be used for cultural purposes in honor of her parents.

=== Home for the Museum of American Heritage ===
In 1997, the City of Palo Alto issued a request for proposals for use of the property and selected the Museum of American Heritage. Following a significant restoration, the museum opened to the public in 1998. While MOAH leases the Williams property from the City of Palo Alto for a nominal fee, the museum bears all maintenance costs for the house and garden without federal or state funding support.

The Williams house is listed as a Category II structure on the Palo Alto Historic Building Inventory. The house features a two-story portion for family living quarters with extensive built-in cabinetry, a single-story section designed for Dr. Williams' medical practice including an operating room with a large skylight, and a detached garage that once housed one of the first automobiles in Palo Alto. A separate building behind the main house, named the Livermore Learning Center, was constructed during the 1997 restoration on the site of the family's original orchard.

=== Marshall Mathews Garage ===
The detached garage on the property was reconstructed during the 1997 restoration on the site of Dr. Williams' original Craftsman-style garage. Dr. Williams was among the first automobile owners in Palo Alto and had the original garage constructed shortly after the family moved into the house. The property also featured a private gas pump connected to an underground gasoline tank, the location of which is still marked by a grate in the back lot.

The garage was named in 2005 in honor of Marshall Mathews (1946–2003), a Woodside automotive enthusiast, philanthropist, and owner of Mathews-Carlsen Body Works in Palo Alto. Mathews served on the MOAH board of directors and regularly loaned vehicles from his extensive personal collection for museum exhibits.

The garage houses two vehicles representative of Henry Ford's most significant contributions to American industry and agriculture. The first is a 1915 Ford Model T, standing in for Dr. Williams' original Autocar vehicle. First released in 1908, the Model T was among the first mass-produced automobiles and became one of the bestselling vehicles in history, with Ford producing over 15 million units. The second vehicle is a 1939 Ford 9N tractor, a joint project between Henry Ford and Irish inventor Harry Ferguson. Ferguson's contribution was a three-point hydraulic mounting system designed to prevent the rearward tipping that had caused injuries and fatalities with earlier tractor designs. Together, the two vehicles illustrate Ford's parallel innovations in personal transportation and agricultural mechanization.

== Williams House Gardens ==
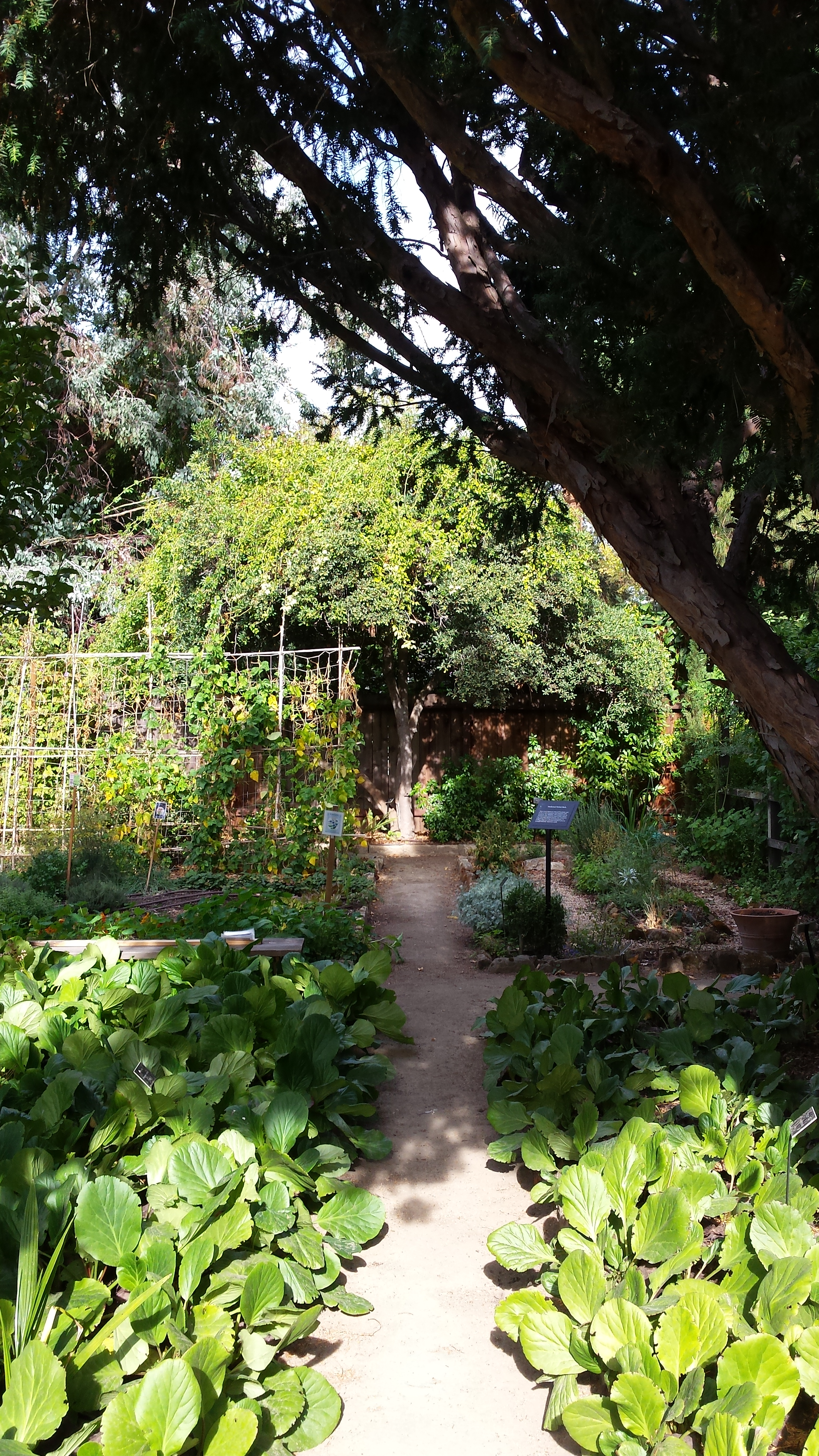
Path in the backyard garden

The Williams garden was the creation of Dora Moody Williams and is representative of early 20th-century residential landscape design. Early photographs of the property show an open vista with an unobstructed view of the house and only a few native trees, but Dora's interest and proficiency in gardening developed along with her garden until it reached a height of complexity in the 1920s and 1930s. Her extensive notes on the garden document its development over the years and have allowed it to be restored to its original character.

Dora organized the garden as a series of "outdoor rooms" delineated by rock walls, border plantings, pathways, and stones, and punctuated by ornamental fountains and ponds. Many ornamental features were selected during the family's travels abroad. At the same time, the garden served more utilitarian functions for the Williams family, including a vegetable garden, a medicinal plants garden, clothes drying, and composting. The garden is attributed to be the only historically preserved landscape in Palo Alto, and one of the few in California.

During the 1990s, MOAH engaged an expert team to restore the garden's original character. Today, the garden is maintained by a team of volunteers, who grow food on the property that is donated to local food banks. The restored garden reflects the style of an early 20th-century working English garden and serves as a venue for public and private events.

== See also ==
- Silicon Valley Museums, for a listing of nearby museums and art galleries
