= Playground Global =

Venture capital firm

Playground Global, LLC
- Type: Private
- Industry: Venture Capital
- Founded: 2015; 11 years ago
- Headquarters: Palo Alto, California
- Key people: Peter Barrett; Matt Hershenson; Bruce Leak; Jory Bell; Laurie Yoler
- Website: Official website

Playground Global, LLC is a venture capital firm established in 2015 and located in Palo Alto, CA, which focuses on early-stage deep tech investments.

== Background ==
Playground Global is an early-stage venture capital firm that invests across next gen compute, automation, energy transition and decarbonization and engineered biology. The company was founded in 2015 by Andy Rubin, Bruce Leak, Matt Hershenson and Peter Barrett.

The firm invests exclusively in technical founders taking large technology risks. Playground's portfolio consists of companies including PsiQuantum, Relativity Space, Ultima Genomics, and MosaicML (acq. by Databricks), d-Matrix, Strand Therapeutics and Velo3D (NYSE: SPFR).
