= Bruce Leak =

American inventor and entrepreneur

Bruce Leak is an American inventor and entrepreneur, and a co-founder at Playground Global. He was one of three co-founders of WebTV and is credited with making several major advances in the Macintosh operating system. Wired magazine described him as an "Apple Hero," saying that he "kick-started the multimedia revolution, bringing quality video to the Mac a year before anything even remotely comparable hit Windows."

== Background ==
Leak graduated from Stanford University with bachelor's and master's degrees in electrical engineering and computer science. During his Stanford years, he worked at Microsoft on the initial versions of Word and Multiplan (Excel). He held senior management and engineering roles at Rocket Science Games and General Magic.

== Apple ==
He began his career at Apple Computer, where he invented and brought to market QuickTime (1991) and 32-bit QuickDraw. '

== WebTV ==
He is one of the co-founders of WebTV Networks, a company founded in 1995 that enabled households to access the Internet through their televisions. He also was the company's chief operating officer and later president. WebTV Networks was purchased by Microsoft in 1997 and absorbed into the Microsoft Network. Leak became the President of Microsoft's WebTV Network subsidiary.

== Carrier IQ ==
In 2005 Leak co-founded Carrier IQ, a company that provides embedded analytics to the wireless industry through embedding diagnostic software in the mobile phone. He was CEO until his replacement by Mark Quinlivan in late 2006. Mr. Quinlivan left Carrier IQ in 2010. In 2011 Larry Lenhart was appointed CEO. In early 2016, Carrier IQ ceased operations and it was announced that AT&T had acquired software assets and staff from the company.

== Playground Global ==
In early 2015 Leak co-founded Playground Global, alongside Andy Rubin, Matt Hershenson and Peter Barrett. Playground Global is a combination venture capital fund and tech incubator that provides resources, mentorship and funding to startups making hardware devices. As of late 2015, Playground Global had raised more than $300 million from investors including Google, Hewlett-Packard Co., electronics manufacturer Hon Hai Precision Industry Co., Tencent Holdings Ltd., Redpoint Ventures, and Seagate Technology PLC.
