= List of Columbian College of Arts and Sciences people =

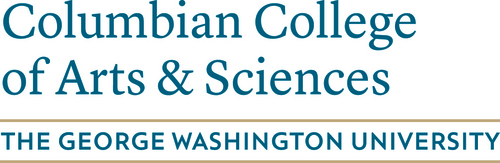

The list of Columbian College of Arts and Sciences people includes notable graduates, professors, and administrators affiliated with the Columbian College of Arts and Sciences of the George Washington University, located in Washington, D.C.

== Alumni ==
=== Arts ===
Name	Known for	Year	Reference
David Lynch	Filmmaker, painter, musician, singer, sound designer, photographer, and actor	(1964)	
Jan Van Dyke	Dancer, choreographer, dance educator and scholar and pioneer of modern and contemporary dance	1967	

=== Media, sports and entertainment ===
Name	Known for	Year	Reference
Taylor Hale	Winner of Big Brother 24, Miss Michigan USA 2021	2017	
Kerry Washington	Actress; Forbes named her the eighth highest-paid television actress in 2018	1998	

=== Politics ===
Name	Known for	Year	Reference
Anwar Gargash	Minister of State for Foreign Affairs of the United Arab Emirates	1981 / 84	
Vincent C. Gray	Politician and former Mayor of the District of Columbia	1964	
Carl Lutz	Swiss diplomat; saved 62,000 Jewish Hungarians during the Holocaust	1924	
Mark Warner	Politician and current U.S. Senator from Virginia	1977	

=== Others ===
Name	Known for	Year	References
Paul Kendrick	Former White House Climate and Domestic Director, author	2005	
Jacqueline Kennedy Onassis	Former First Lady of the United States	1951	
Daniel H. Weiss	Art historian and current president and chief executive officer of the Metropolitan Museum of Art	1979	

== Faculty ==
=== Current faculty ===
==== Administration ====
- Eric Arnesen - vice dean of faculty and administration of the Columbian College of Arts and Sciences
- Kathryn Newcomer - director, Columbian College's Trachtenberg School of Public Policy and Public Administration
- Frank Sesno - director, George Washington University School of Media and Public Affairs
- Sanjit Sethi - director, Corcoran School of the Arts and Design
- Paul Wahlbeck - interim dean, Columbian College of Arts and Sciences

==== Faculty ====
- Sarah Binder - professor of political science, senior fellow at the Brookings Institution and an inductee to the American Academy of Arts and Sciences
- Dana Tai Soon Burgess - professor of dance, cultural ambassador for the U.S. State Department; renowned choreographer
- Chryssa Kouveliotou - professor of physics, former NASA senior scientist and a leading expert on gamma-ray bursts
- Sarah Wagner - associate professor of anthropology, recipient of a Guggenheim Fellowship
- Gayle Wald - professor of English, recipient of Guggenheim and National Endowment for the Humanities Fellowships
