= Chantelle Abdul =

Chantelle Abdul is a Nigerian energy expert and entrepreneur serving as the Group Managing Director (GMD) and chief executive officer (CEO) of Mojec International Holdings – a Nigerian conglomerate with interests in power, energy, real estate, and agriculture. She currently serves as a non-executive director on the board of the federal Ministry of Finance Incorporated (MOFI) of Nigeria appointed by President Bola Tinubu in 2023.

== Education ==
Chantelle Abdul had her primary and secondary school education in Lagos, Nigeria. She earned a bachelor's degree in Biotechnology and Economics with double honours from Columbian College of Arts and Sciences, George Washington University in 1999. She holds executive and leadership certifications from Harvard Business School and the Stanford Graduate School of Business.

== Career ==
Abdul began her career in the United States in early 2000 serving as financial and business analyst at Wall Street firms including Salomon Smith Barney and Morgan Stanley Dean Witter and later transferred to The Executive Group as vice president of development in mid 2000s.

She returned to Nigeria to join her family business – Mojec International Holdings in late 2000s and became the company's Group Managing Director and chief executive officer in 2015. Abdul diversified the company's interests and built it into a conglomerate with several subsidiaries including Mojec Power, Mojec Meter Company, Mojec Real Estate and Mojec Agriculture. She is credited for developing Mojec Meter Asset Management Company (M3AC) into the largest indigenous manufacturer, distributor, and installer of smart electricity meters in Sub-Saharan Africa with a reported over 400,000 electricity meters installation in Nigeria annually.

In 2023, President Bola Tinubu appointed Abdul as a non-executive director to the board of the Ministry of Finance Incorporated (MOFI) - the Federal Government of Nigeria's investment vehicle managing state-owned assets and state-linked companies.

Abdul was named Leadership Business Person of the Year 2022 for her leadership of Mojec International Holdings and was named Energy Times’ Most Influential Personality Of The Year (2025).
