= Sarah Wagner =

American professor of anthropology

Academic background
- Education: Harvard University

Sarah E. Wagner is an American professor of anthropology at the George Washington University's Columbian College of Arts and Sciences and a 2017 Guggenheim Fellow. Wagner is especially recognized for her research and work on genocides.

== Early life and education ==
Wagner graduated with a B.A. from Dartmouth College in 1994 and obtained an M.A.L.D. from Fletcher School of Law and Diplomacy at Tufts University in 2002. In 2006, she received a Ph.D. from Harvard University.

== Career ==
Wagner started her career at the University of North Carolina at Greensboro, where she taught for five years. Subsequently, she came to the George Washington University.

Wagner works both in America, as well as "in the field" in different countries around the world and also supervises work around the world.

Wagner is frequently interviewed about her work in different publications and writes articles, blogs and columns herself.

== Works ==
Wagner has (co-) published two books and various articles and book chapters. She is currently working on her third publication, for which she was awarded two scholarships.

=== Books ===
- To Know Where He Lies: DNA Technology and the Search for Srebrenica's Missing (2008)
- Srebenica in the Aftermath of Genocide (2014, with Nettelfield)

== Awards and recognitions ==
Throughout her academic career, Wagner has received different scholarships, fellowships and grant in support of and for her work.

In 2001, Wagner received the Fainsod Prize or top incoming graduate students at Harvard University and in 2005, received a fellowship to complete her dissertation "The Return of Identity: Technology, Memory, and the Identification of the Missing from the July 1995 Massacre in Srebrenica, Bosnia-Herzegovina".

In 2015, Wagner's second book (Srebenica in the Aftermath of Genocide) received an Honorable Mention for the International Studies Association’s Ethnicity, Migration and Nationalism Distinguished Book Award. The book was also listed for the Rothschild Prize of the Association for the Study of Nationalities in the same year.

In 2017, Wagner received a Guggenheim Fellowship and a Public Scholar award by the National Endowment for the Humanities (NEH) to finish her third book "Bringing Them Home: Identifying and remembering Vietnam War MIAs".
