= Paul J. Wahlbeck =

American political scientist, lawyer, and academic administrator

Paul J. Wahlbeck is an American political scientist, lawyer, and academic administrator. He has served as the dean of the Columbian College of Arts and Sciences since 2020. He is a professor of political science.

Wahlbeck completed a B.A. in political science at Wheaton College in 1983. He earned a J.D. at the University of Illinois Urbana-Champaign in 1986. He completed a Ph.D. in political science at the Washington University in St. Louis in 1993.

== Selected works ==
- Maltzman, Forrest; Spriggs, James F.; Wahlbeck, Paul J. (2000). Crafting Law on the Supreme Court: The Collegial Game. Cambridge University Press. ISBN 978-0-521-78394-1.
