= Sanjit Sethi =

College president of Minneapolis College of Art and Design

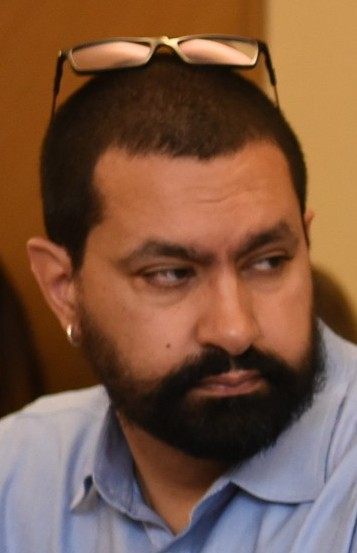
- Occupation: Artist

Academic background
- Education: Alfred University; University of Georgia; Massachusetts Institute of Technology

Sanjit Sethi is an American artist and is the former president of the Minneapolis College of Art and Design.

== Early life and education ==
Sethi obtained a BFA in ceramics from the New York State College of Ceramics at Alfred University in 1994 and an MFA in the same field from Lamar Dodd School of Art at the University of Georgia in 1998. In 2002, he graduated with an MSc in Advanced Visual Studies from the Massachusetts Institute of Technology.

== Career ==
From 2004 to 2008, Sethi served at the Memphis College of Art, where he was director of the MFA program.

Subsequently, he served as Barclay Simpson chair and assistant professor of Community Arts at the California College of the Arts, where he subsequently also served as Director of the Center for Art and Public Life.

In 2013, Sethi was appointed as the executive director of the Santa Fe Art Institute (SFAI) and served in this position until 2015.

In 2015, Sethi then became the first Director of the Corcoran School of Arts and Design at George Washington University, after the school had been integrated into GWU's Columbian College of Arts and Sciences in 2014.

In 2018, only one month after Cartoonist Rob Rogers had been fired from the Pittsburgh Post-Gazette for cartoons that were critical of President Trump, which caused national criticism and news coverage, Sethi organized an exhibition at Corcoran, titled Spiked: The Unpublished Political Cartoons of Rob Rogers which featured the 18 cartoons.

From 2019 to 2025, Sethi was the 19th president of the Minneapolis College of Art and Design.

== Works ==
Besides his academic profession, Sethi also works as an artist and has worked on different projects and exhibitions around the world.

== Awards and recognitions ==
Sethi has been awarded different grants and fellowships, including an Enrichment Travel Fellowship to work on his project "Gypsy Bridge Project" in London, Budapest and Dublin.
