= Trachtenberg School of Public Policy and Public Administration =

Public policy school at George Washington University

Coordinates: 38.8999°N 77.0462°W

Trachtenberg School
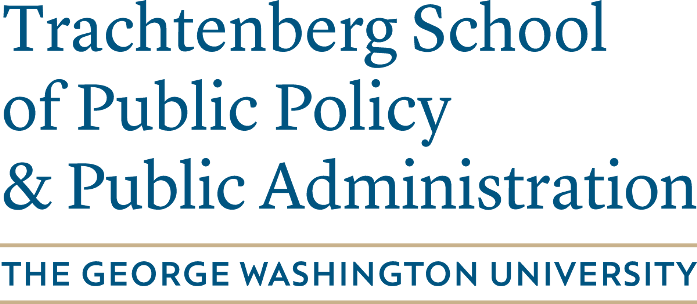
- Type: Private
- Established: 2003; 23 years ago
- Affiliations: NASPAA
- Director: Kathryn Newcomer
- Academic staff: 47
- Students: 425
- Location: 805 21st St NW, Washington, D.C., 20052, United States
- Campus: Urban — Foggy Bottom
- Website: www.tspppa.gwu.edu

The Trachtenberg School, officially the Trachtenberg School of Public Policy and Public Administration (TSPPPA), is the graduate public policy school in the Columbian College of Arts and Sciences of the George Washington University, in Washington, D.C.

The Trachtenberg School teaches public policy, public administration, environmental studies, and environmental science by offering a Master of Public Policy, Master of Public Administration, Master of Arts in Environmental Resource Management, and a PhD in Public Policy and Public Administration.

== History ==
Long requested by George Washington, education in public service and government began at George Washington University with the construction of the Hall of Government in 1927. The university gradually expanded its offerings in the field, and by 1950, public administration courses were offered in the School of Government, Department of Business, and the Department of Political Science. In 1953, the Department of Political Science organized these offerings into a Master of Arts in Public Administration degree. To address the call for professional training in public administration, in 1956, graduate level public administration courses were consolidated into the newly formed Department of Business and Public Administration in the School of Government. The school was subsequently reorganized in 1963 into the School of Government and Business Administration, including a Department of Public Administration. That same year, the department began offering a Master of Public Administration degree. The program consisted of 36 credit hours of coursework following the early guidelines of the National Association of Public Administration and Public Affairs. Further changes to the program expanded the course of study to a 40 credit hour program. The Columbian College of Arts and Sciences also established Masters of Public Policy and PhD in Public Policy programs. In 2003, all three programs were merged into the School of Public Policy and Public Administration within the Columbian College of Arts and Sciences. The School was recognized as one of the seven academic units designated as signature programs of selective excellence within the University. Most recently, in 2007, the university Board of Trustees renamed the School of Public Policy and Public Administration the Trachtenberg School of Public Policy and Public Administration in recognition of President-emeritus Stephen Joel Trachtenberg.

== Academics ==
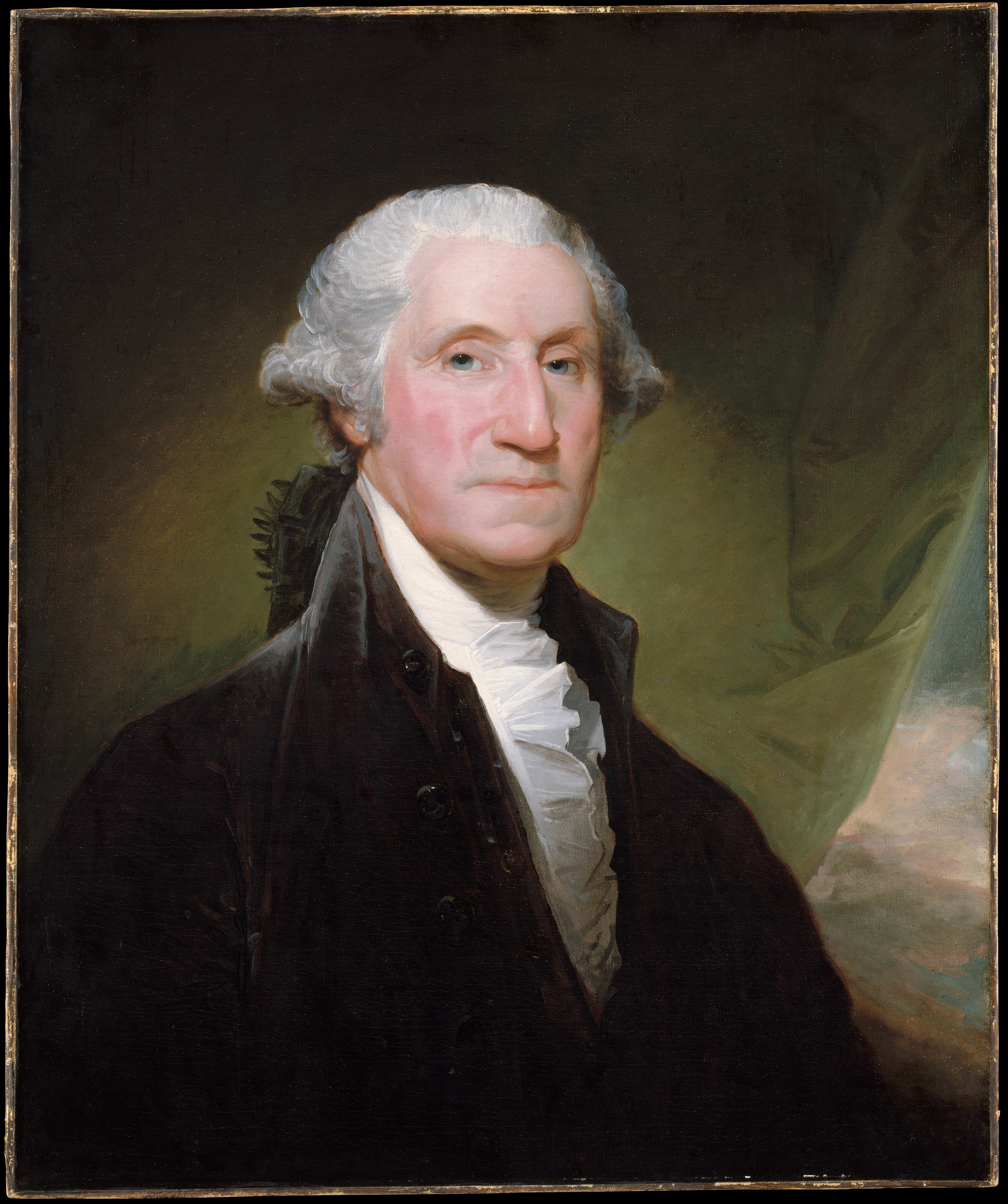
Now embodied by the Trachtenberg School, George Washington requested that a component of the University would educate students in the principles of effective governance.

The Trachtenberg School of Public Policy and Public Administration offers master's degrees in public policy, public administration, and environmental and natural resource policy, as well as a PhD in Public Policy and Administration and certificates in Nonprofit Management, Environmental Resource Policy, and Budget & Public Finance. The MPA and MPP degrees each consist of a core curriculum and a field of study chosen by students. Many of these fields of study are offered in partnership with other schools within the university, including the Elliott School of International Affairs, School of Public Health and Health Services, and Graduate School of Education & Human Development. The Trachtenberg School is one of only a few schools to offer both MPA and MPP degrees accredited by the National Association of Schools of Public Affairs and Administration (NASPAA).

=== Master of Public Administration (MPA) ===
The degree is a 40 credit program with an emphasis on public management, budgeting and cost-benefit analysis. Graduates work on historical and hypothetical scenarios to learn effective ways of dealing with issues that arise in government, non-profits and business. Courses include ethics, statistics, finance and organizational planning.

=== Master of Public Policy (MPP) ===
The degree is a 40 credit program and with an emphasis on analyzing, evaluating, and solving aspects of policy. Graduates work with quantitative and qualitative data to develop, assess, and evaluate alternative approaches to current and emerging issues. Students take advanced courses in economics, statistics and econometrics with application to policy and government.

=== Master of Arts in Environmental and Natural Resources Policy (ENRP) ===
The degree builds upon the foundation of a public policy program with a focus on environmental and natural resource issues and concepts.

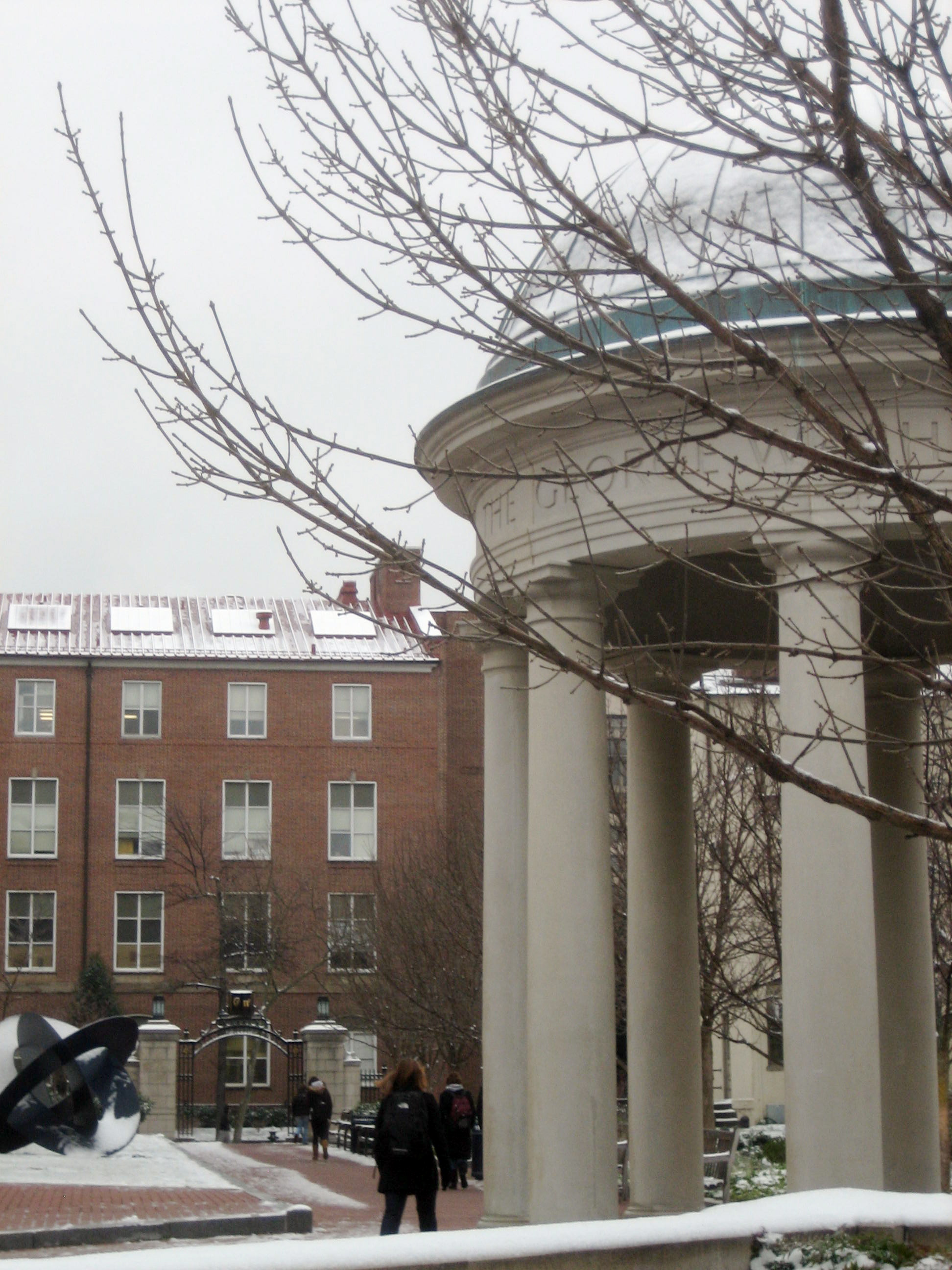
The Trachtenberg School sits next to Kogan Plaza.

=== PhD in Public Policy and Public Administration ===
The doctoral program offers a rigorous multidisciplinary curriculum that prepares students for careers in university teaching and research, research institutions, federal, state, and local governments, and international organizations. In addition to developing broad analytical skills in multiple subjects, students take courses designed to prepare them to undertake research in specific areas of public policy and administration. Through course work in each specialized field, students develop expertise for a variety of careers in the public and private sectors.

=== Combined programs ===
In addition to degrees offered solely by the Trachtenberg School, the school offers combined MPA/JD and MPP/JD degree programs with The George Washington University Law School and a joint MPP/PhD with the Department of Political Science, as well as various combined Bachelor of Arts/MPP and BA/MPA degrees for undergraduates.

- Master of Public Administration / Juris Doctor (MPA/JD)
- Master of Public Policy / Juris Doctor (MPP/JD)
- Master of Public Policy / Doctorate of Public Policy and Administration (MPP/PhD)
- Bachelor of Arts / Master of Public Policy (BA/MPP)
- Bachelor of Arts / Master of Public Policy (BA/MPP)

== Rankings ==
U.S. News & World Report University Rankings ranks the Trachtenberg School as the 10th best public affairs school in the United States (the highest ranked in Washington, DC) and as having the 6th best Global Policy program, 11th best public management program, the 14th best health policy program, and the 20th best social policy program in the U.S.

== Research ==
The Trachtenberg School is affiliated with several research centers at The George Washington University. Many faculty and students perform research in partnership with these centers. The centers are:

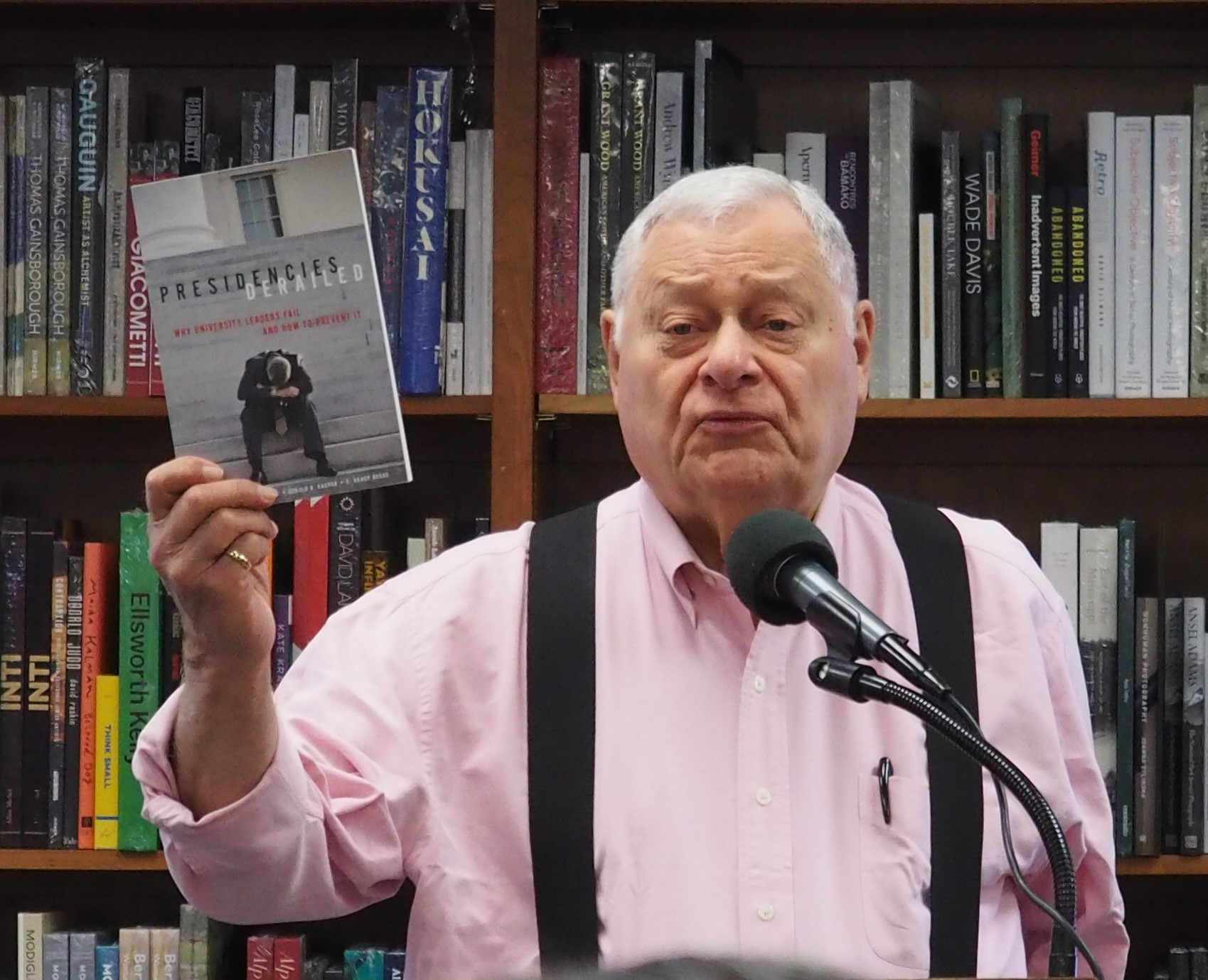
President-Emeritus Stephen Joel Trachtenberg presenting his book "Presidencies Derailed" at the School.

- The George Washington Institute for Public Policy
- Regulatory Studies Center
- The Center for Washington Area Studies
- The State and Local Fiscal Policy Program
- The Midge Smith Center for Evaluation Effectiveness
- GW Project on Extremism
- Global Food Institute
- Eleanor Roosevelt Papers Project
- First Federal Congress Project
- Institute for International Economic Policy
- Institute for International Science and Technology Policy
- Cisneros Hispanic Leadership Institute
- Institute for Politics, Democracy & the Internet
- Space Policy Institute

== Notable alumni ==
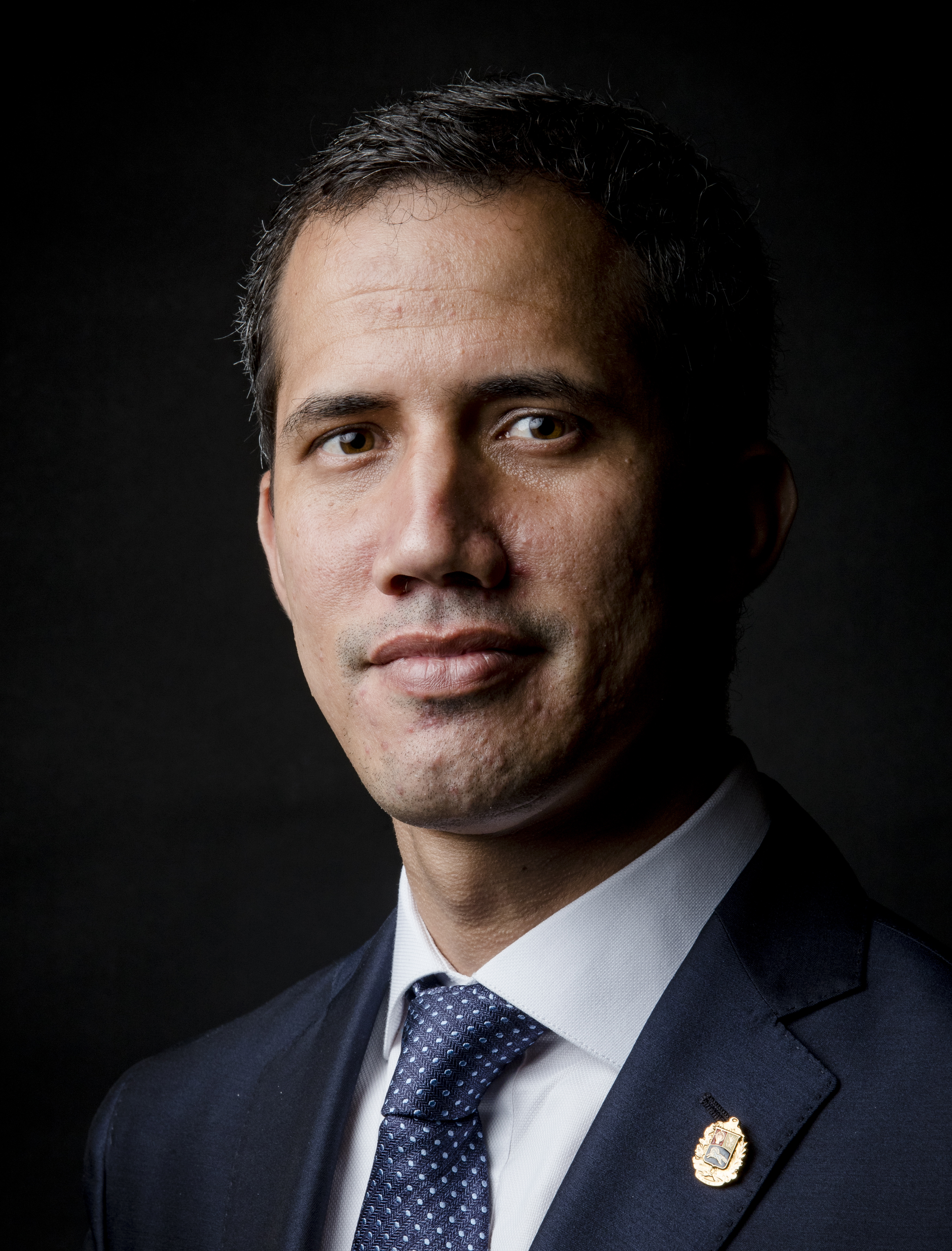
Juan Guaidó disputed President of Venezuela

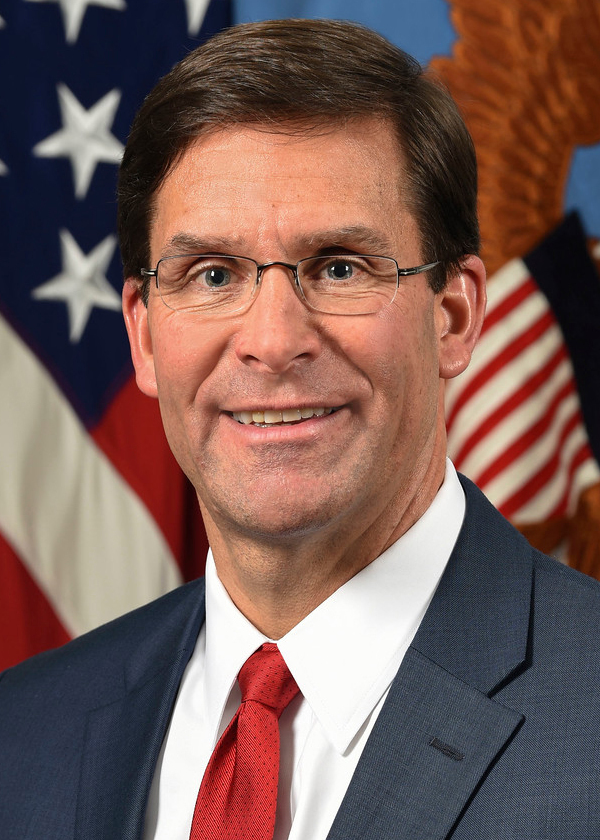
Mark Esper - 27th Secretary of Defense, 23rd Secretary of the Army

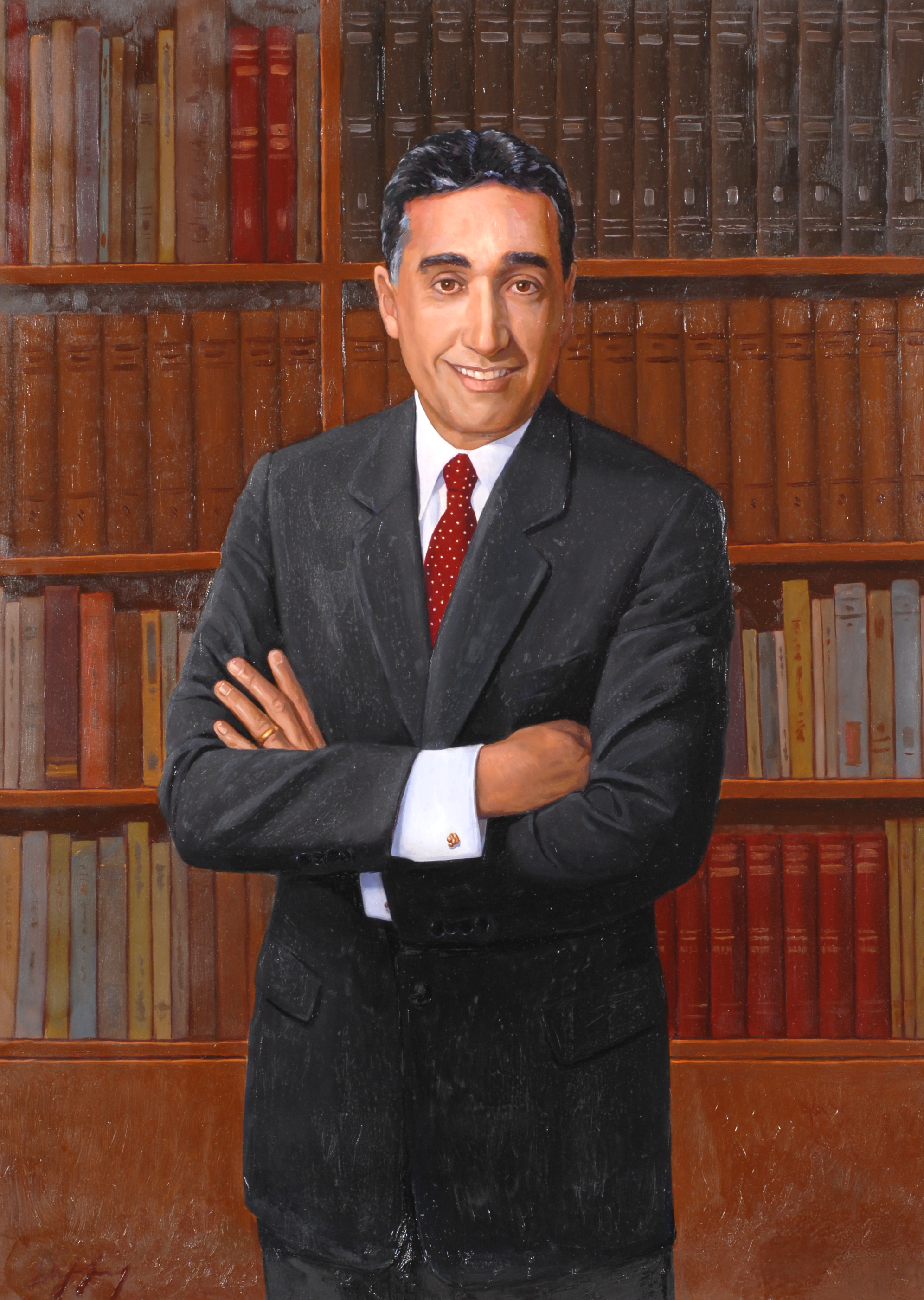
Henry Cisneros - 10th United States Secretary of Housing and Urban Development, former Mayor of San Antonio

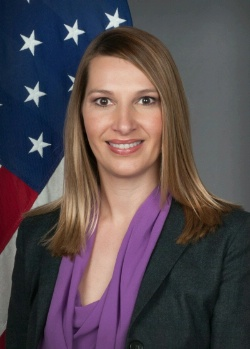
Heather Higginbottom - Deputy Assistant for Domestic Policy to Barack Obama and head of the JPMorgan Policy Center

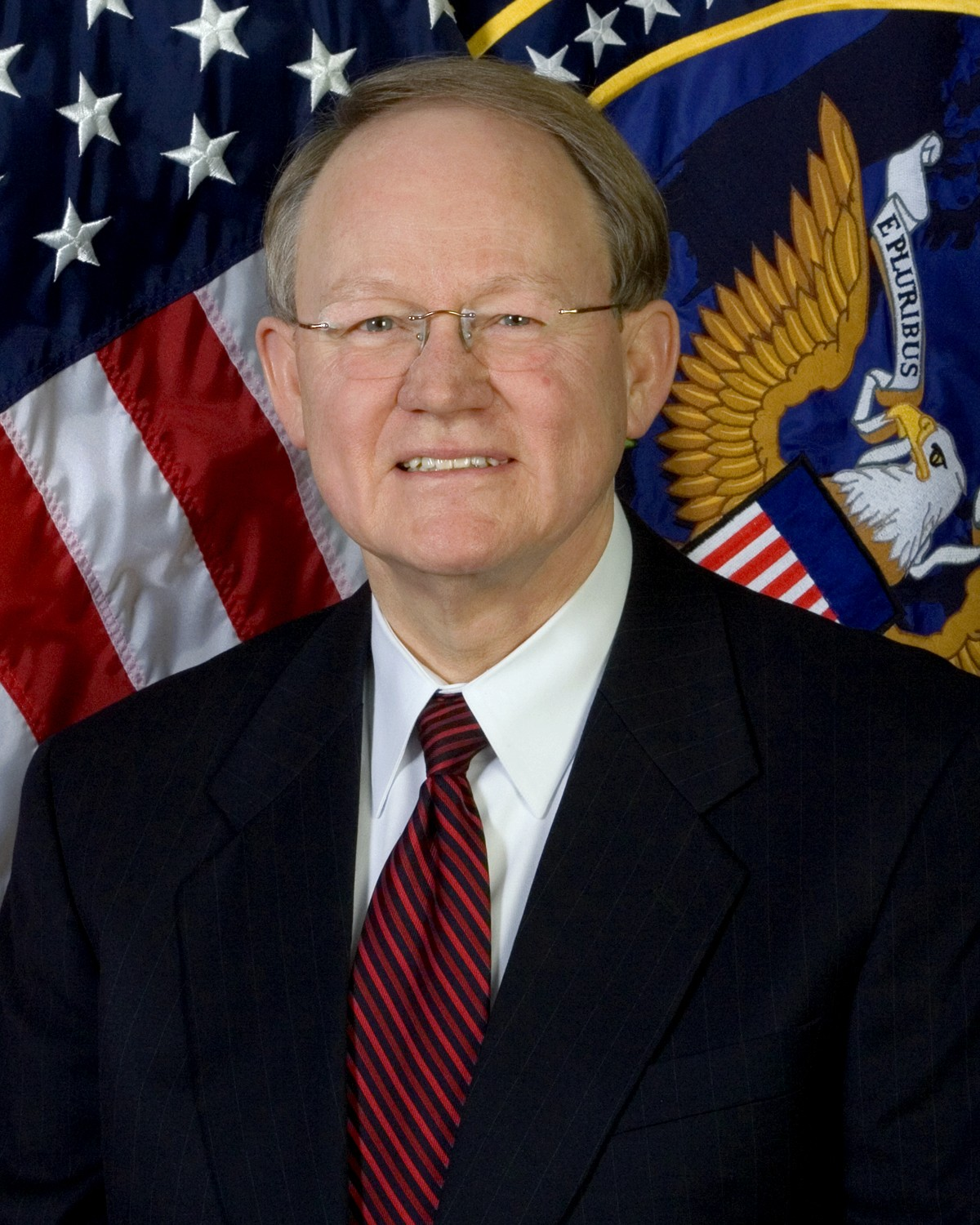
Mike McConnell - Former Director of the National Security Agency and United States Director of National Intelligence

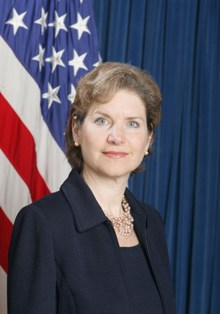
Susan Schwab - Former United States Trade Representative

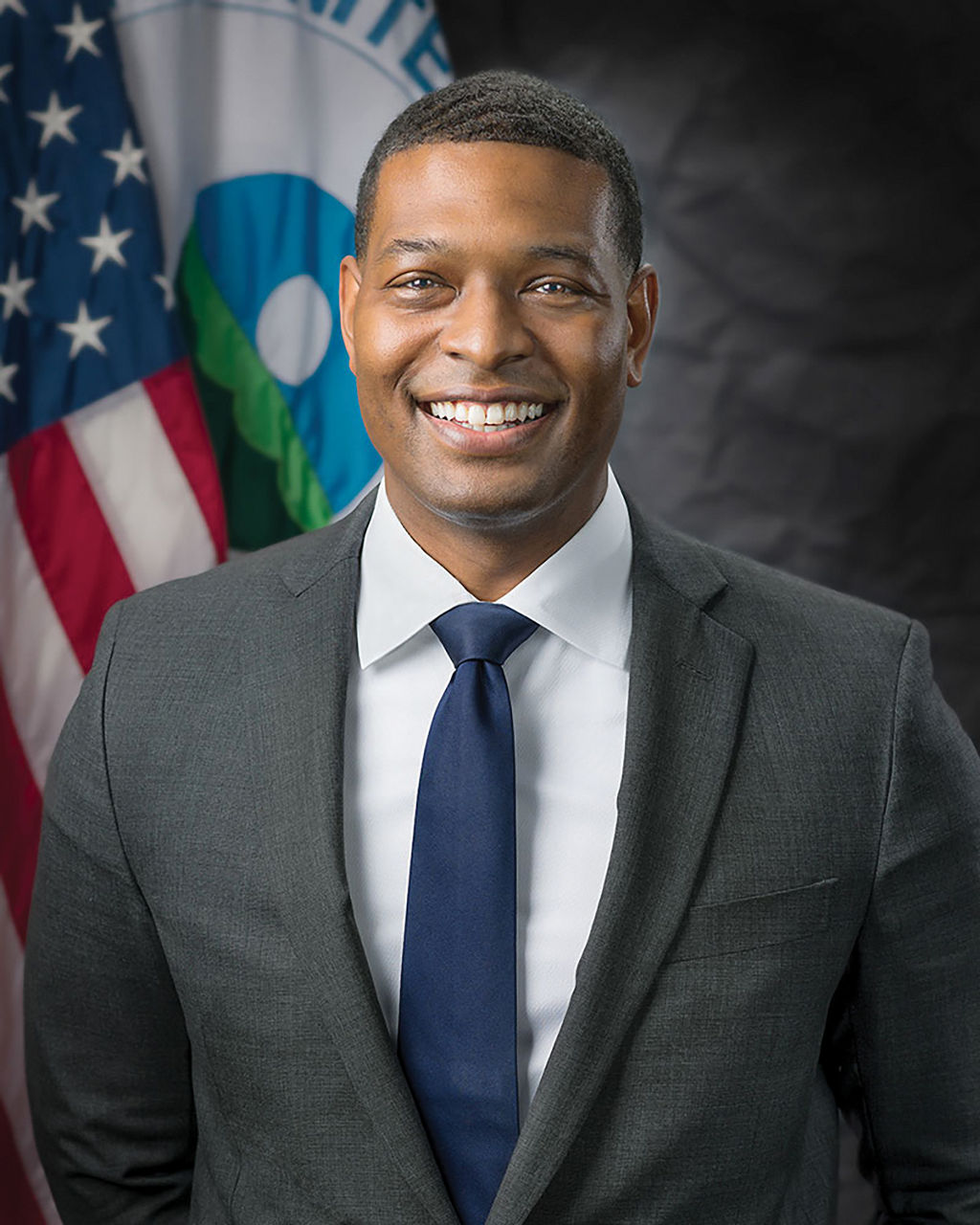
Michael S. Regan - 16th administrator of the Environmental Protection Agency

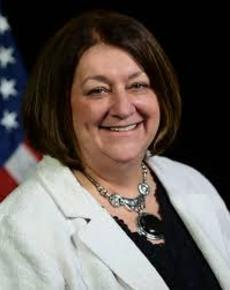
Nancy Potok - Chief Statistician of the United States, former Deputy Undersecretary for Economic Affairs, US Department of Commerce

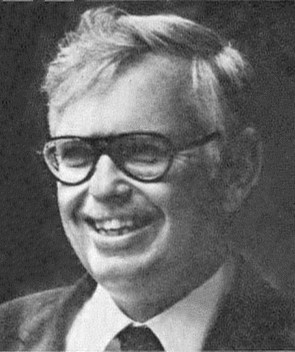
Gilbert Gude - Politician, Delegate, Sponsor of the D.C. Metro System and Home Rule, and WWII Veteran

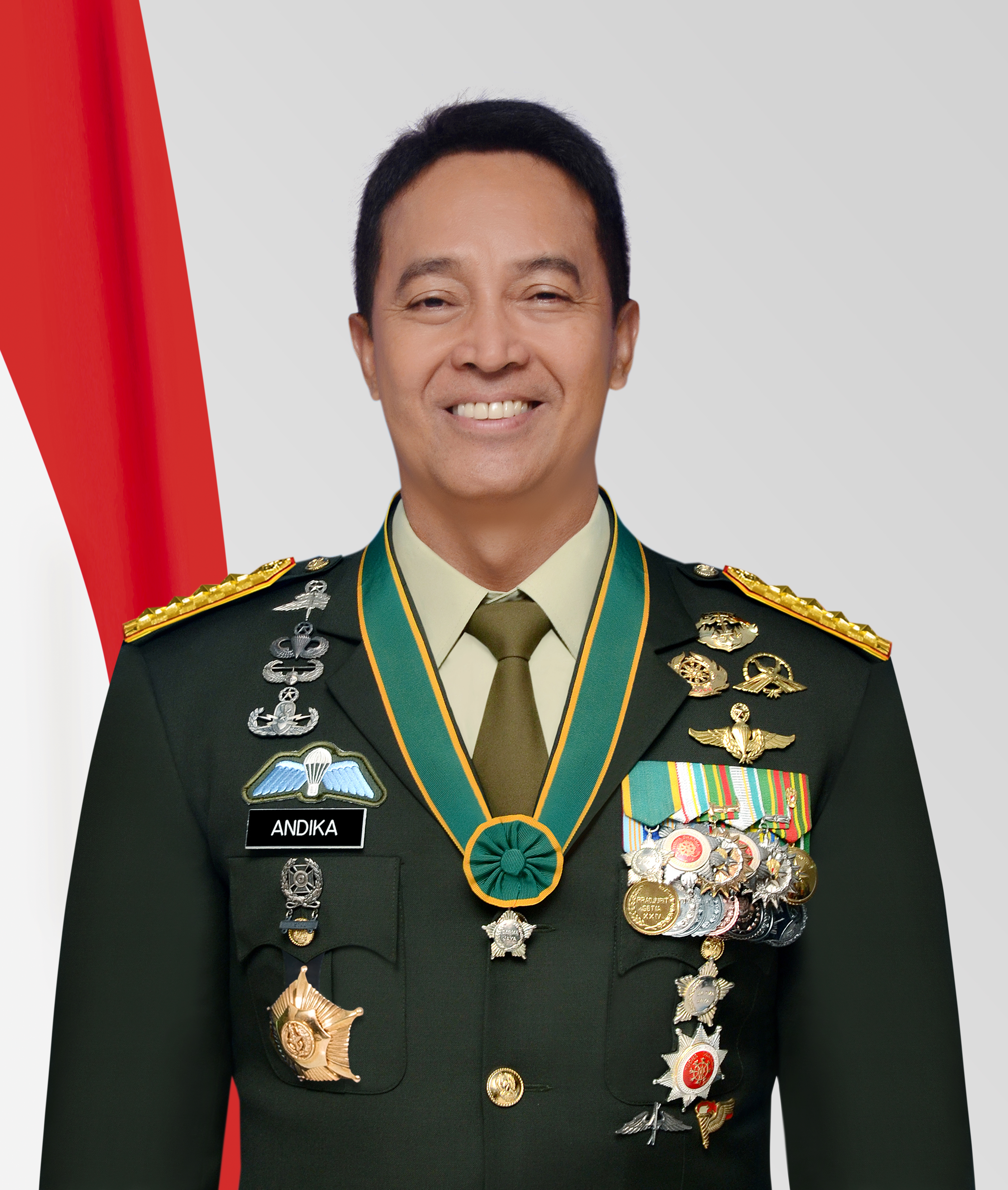
Andika Perkasa - Commander of the National Armed Forces of Indonesia

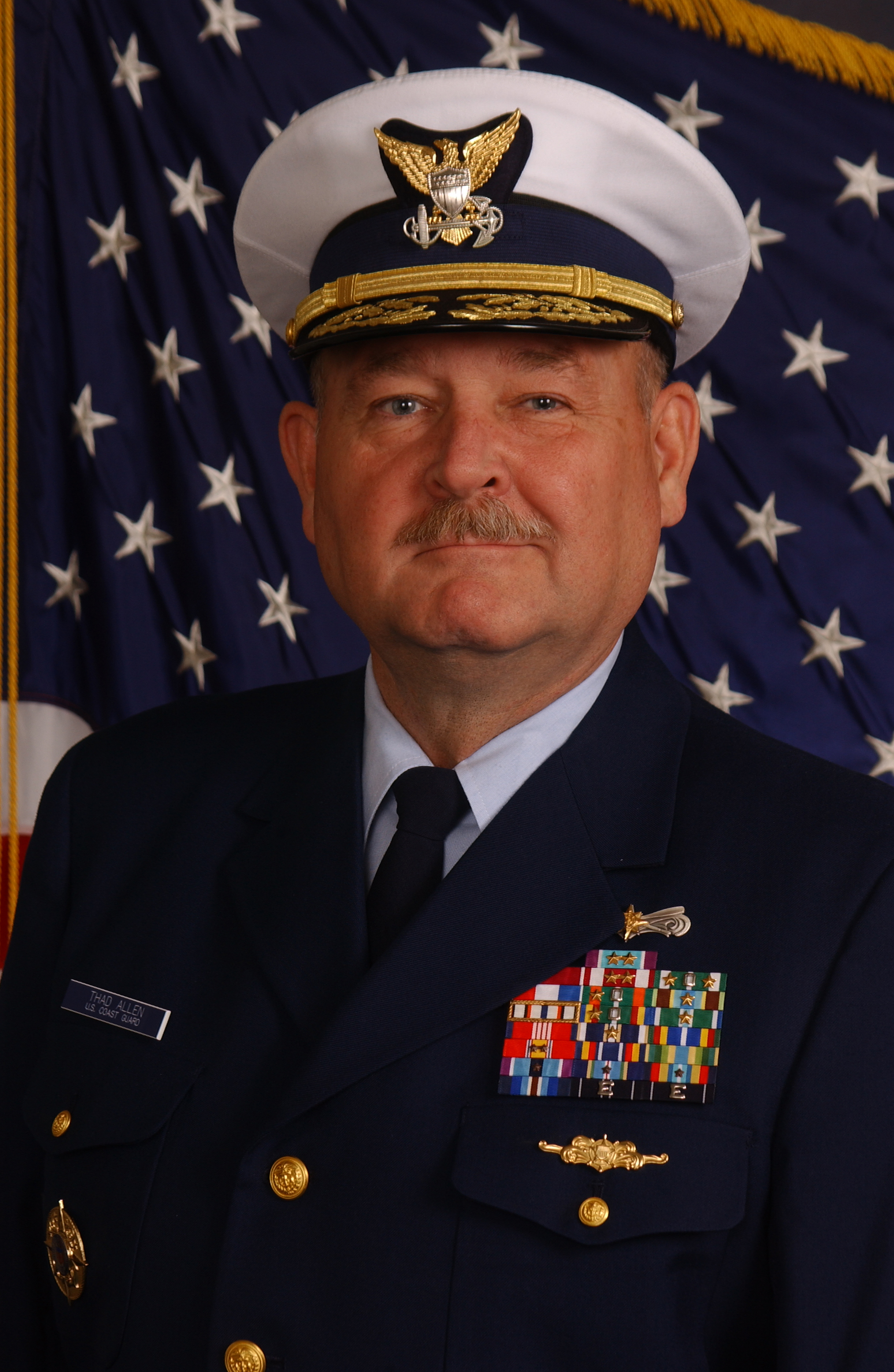
Thad Allen - Commandant of the United States Coast Guard

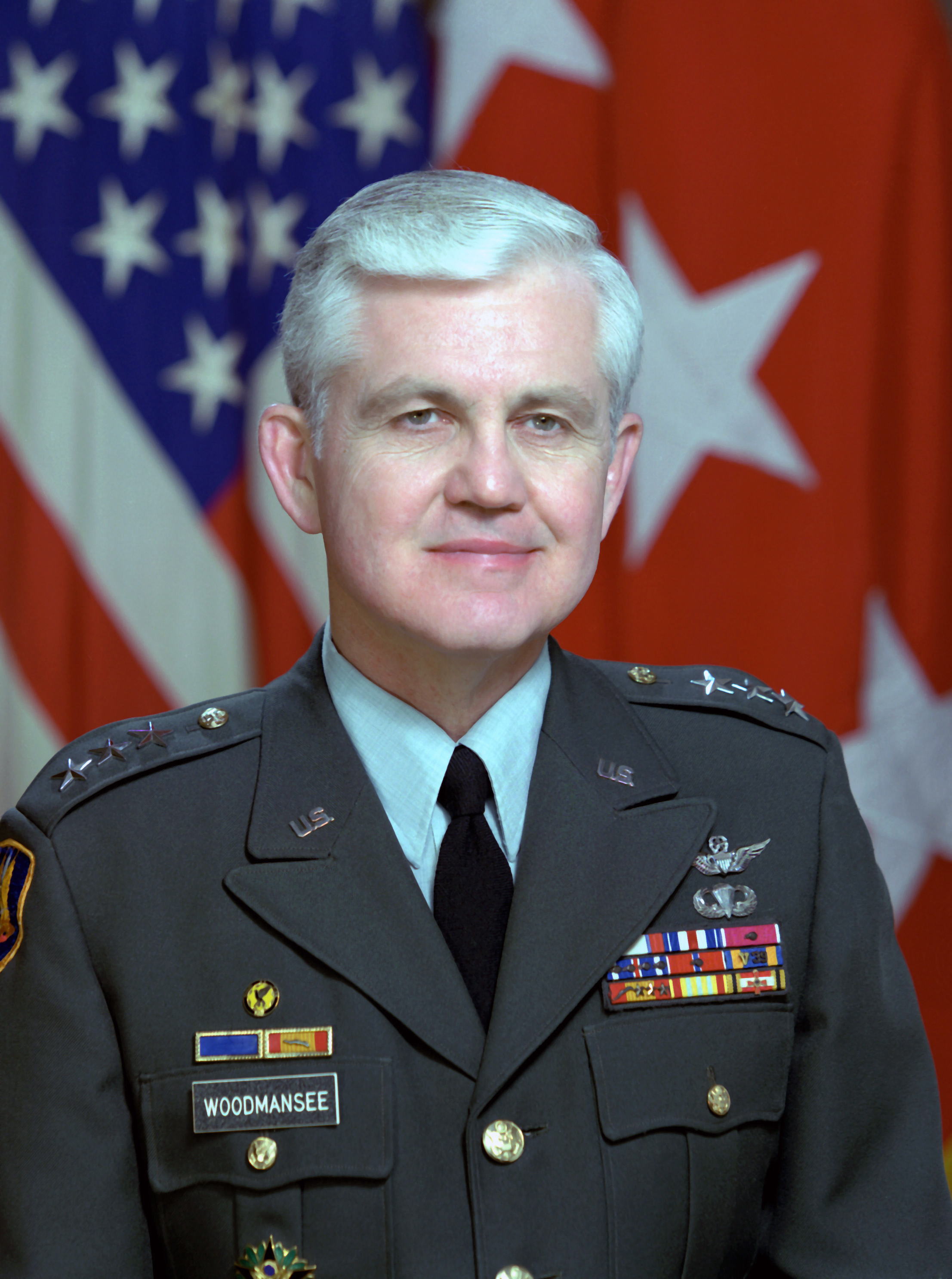
John W. Woodmansee - Commanding General of V Corps

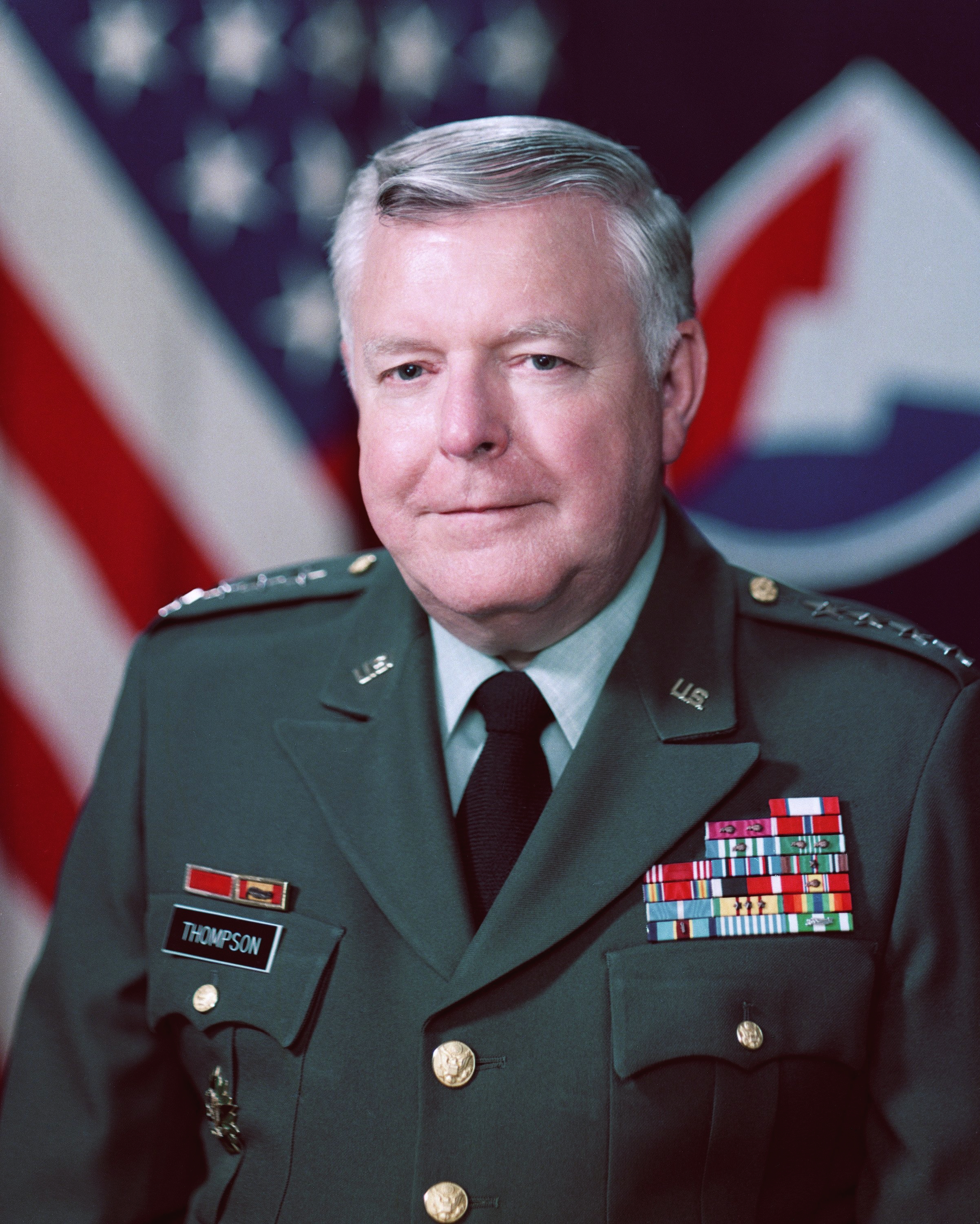
Richard Horner Thompson - United States Army general

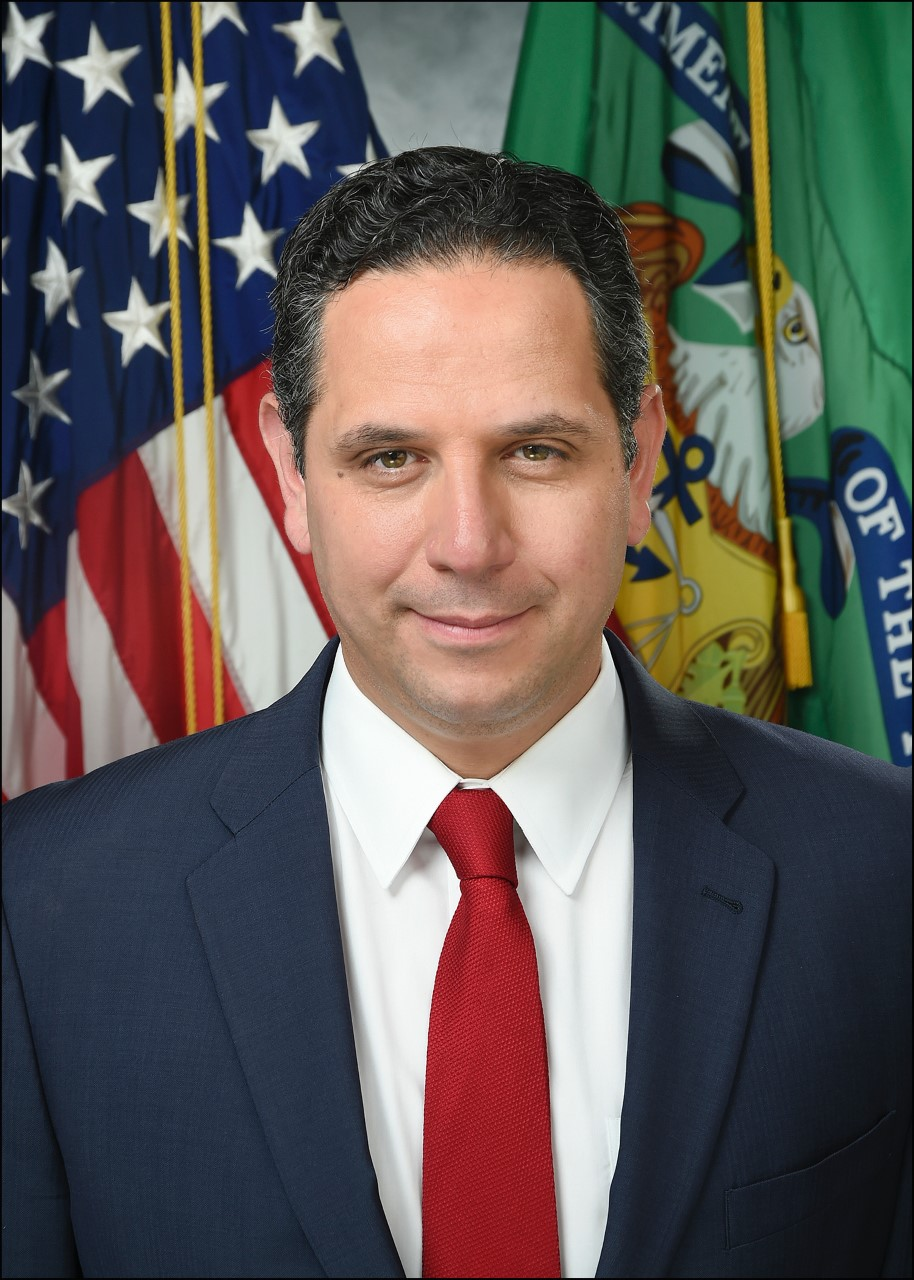
Tony Sayegh - White House Senior Advisor, Assistant Secretary for Public Affairs for the U.S. Department of the Treasury and Executive Vice President at Jamestown Associates
