= Kathryn Newcomer =

American political scientist, author

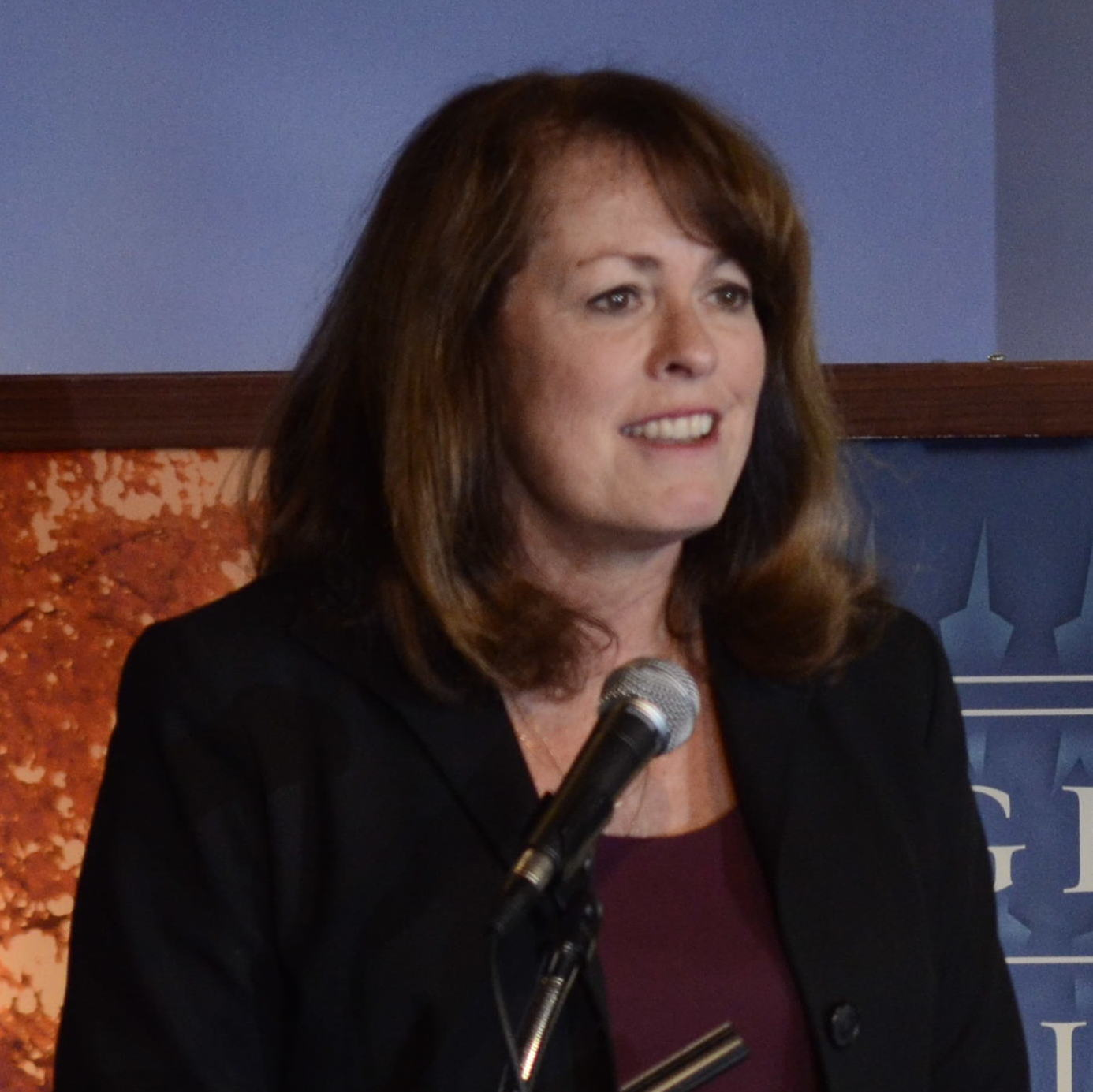
- Occupations: Author; Political scientist professor Academic Administrator
- Title: Director of the Trachtenberg School of Public Policy and Public Administration
- Awards: Elmer Staats Award for Achievements in Government Accountability by the American Society for Public Administration (2008); Duncombe Excellence in Doctoral Education Award by NASPAA (2016)

Academic background
- Education: University of Kansas; University of Iowa

Kathryn Newcomer is an American Political Scientist, author and professor of public policy and public administration. She is the director of the George Washington University's Trachtenberg School of Public Policy and Public Administration.

== Early life and education ==
Newcomer graduated with a B.A. in education and an M.A. in political sciences from the University of Kansas. Subsequently, she obtained a PhD from the University of Iowa. While in Kansas, Newcomer served on the University Senate Libraries Committee.

== Career ==
Newcomer started her career as Visiting Assistant Professor at the University of Denver. Subsequently, she served as an assistant professor at the University of Nebraska and then joined George Washington University as Professor and Chair of the Department of Public Administration.

== Works ==
Newcomer has authored and co-authored different books and various publications.

Among her notable works are:

- The Handbook of Practical Program Evaluation (1994)
- Meeting the Challenges of Performance-Oriented Government (2002)
- Getting Results: A Guide for Federal Leaders and Managers (2005)
- Transformational Leadership: Leading Change in Public and Nonprofit Agencies (2008)
- U.S. Inspectors General: Truth Tellers in Turbulent Times. Brookings, 2020. Co-author: Charles Johnson.
- Evidence-Building and Evaluation in Government. 2022. Sage Publisher. Co-author: Nick Hart.
- Engagement for Equitable Outcomes: A Practitioner’s Playbook. 2022. Rowman Littlefield Publisher.Co-authors: Quentin Wilson and Allyson Criner Brown.
- Research Handbook on Program Evaluation. 2024. New York: Edward Edgar Publisher. Co-editor: Steven Mumford.

Newcomer also serves on the Editorial Board of The American Review of Public Administration.

== Additional affiliations ==
Newcomer is a member of the National Academy of Public Administration since 1996, and currently serves on the Controller General's Education Advisory Panel.

From 2006 to 2007, Newcomer served as President of the Network of Schools of Public Policy, Affairs and Administration (NASPAA).

From 2008 to 2014, Newcomer served on the Advisory Committee on Business and Operations of the National Science Foundation and since 2008, served on six committees of the National Academy of Sciences. She also served as a member of the board of the American Evaluation Association (AEA) from 2012 to 2015. In 2017, she became President of AEA.

== Awards and recognitions ==
Newcomer awards and recognitions include:

- The Elmer Staats Award for Achievements in Government Accountability by the American Society for Public Administration (2008)
- The Duncombe Excellence in Doctoral Education Award by NASPAA (2016)

She has also received the Peter Vaill Award for Excellence in Education (1995) and the Oscar and Shoshanna Trachtenberg Prize for Service (2014).
