= Columbian College of Arts and Sciences =

College of George Washington University

Coordinates: 38°53′59.7″N 77°2′53.4″W

Columbian College of Arts & Sciences
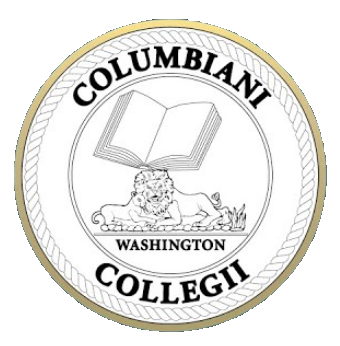
- Motto: Deus Nobis Fiducia (In God Our Trust)
- Type: Private
- Established: 1821
- Parent institution: George Washington University
- Dean: Paul J. Wahlbeck
- Academic staff: 1,007
- Undergraduates: 4,933
- Postgraduates: 1,763
- Doctoral students: 861
- Location: 801 22nd St. NW, Washington, D.C., U.S., Washington, D.C., U.S.
- Campus: Foggy Bottom, Washington, D.C., U.S.
- Website: columbian.gwu.edu
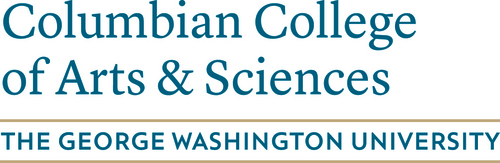

The Columbian College of Arts and Sciences (known as Columbian College or CCAS) is the college of liberal arts and sciences of the George Washington University, in Washington, D.C. CCAS is the largest school at George Washington University, with around 5,000 undergraduate students and 2,500 graduate students, and 42 academic departments, representing a significant portion of the University's instructional, scholarly and research activity.

The college is known for its numerous prominent alumni, particularly in the fields of government, economic development, and public policy, including notable living figures, such as Anwar Gargash (current Minister of State for Foreign Affairs of the United Arab Emirates), sitting U.S. Senator Mark Warner, Vincent C. Gray (former Mayor of the District of Columbia) and Daniel Weiss (CEO of the Metropolitan Museum of Art). Historical alumni include First Lady Jacqueline Kennedy Onassis and Ralph Asher Alpher, "father of the Big Bang theory".

== History ==
The Columbian College of Arts and Sciences is the original college of George Washington University and one of the oldest colleges in the United States. It was created as a Baptist institution by Reverend Luther Rice, and officially founded as the Columbian College on February 9, 1821 by an act of Congress signed by President James Monroe. Originally, the college consisted of two departments: the Theological Department and Classical Department, with individual professors covering other subjects such as mathematics and anatomy.

The college's first class graduated in 1824, where the president presented each of the three graduates with their degree in the presence of the Marquis de Lafayette and college president William Staughton.

The college conferred its first Master of Arts degree in 1831. It was one of the first institutions in the United States to award a doctorate, awarding a Doctor of Philosophy degree in 1888. However, the graduate program was not formally established until 1905.

With the dawn of the Civil War in 1861, the majority of the students left the college to fight for the Confederacy, and the campus buildings were used as a hospital and barracks. In 1873, the college became Columbian University and in 1904 the George Washington University was established by an Act of Congress, with Columbian College and its Graduate School being integrated in the Department of Arts and Sciences.

In 1962, Columbian College changed its name to the Columbian College of Arts and Sciences.

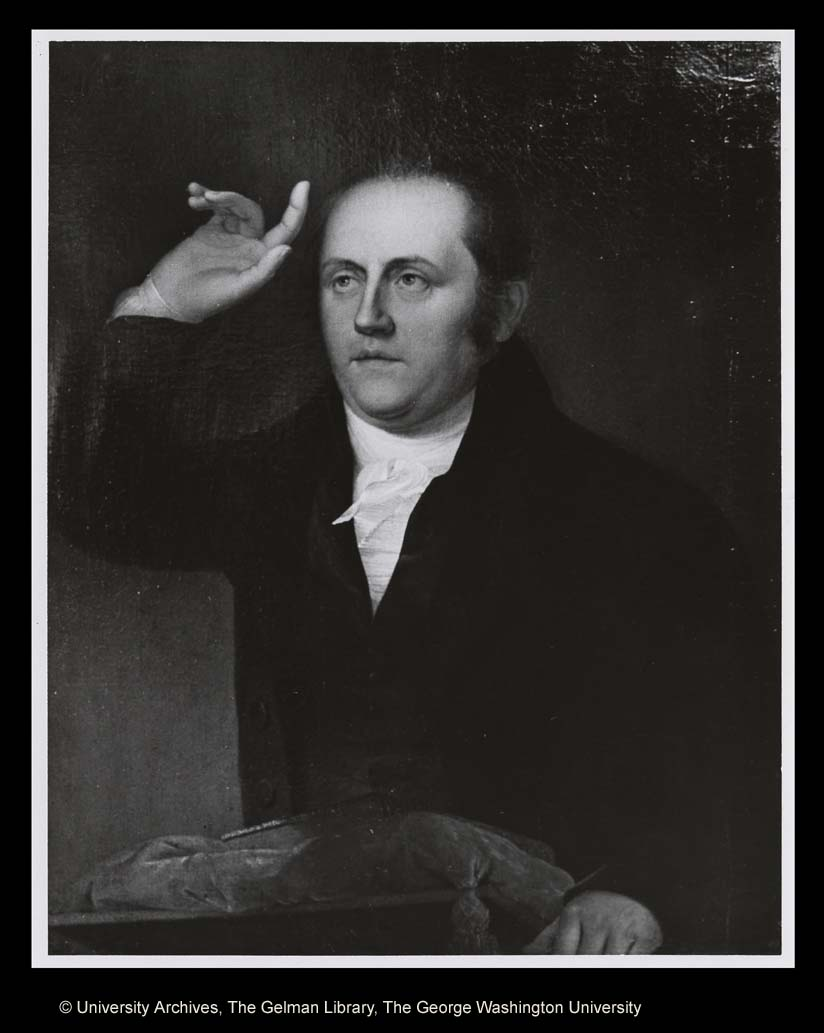
The first President of Columbian College, William Staughton.

== Facilities ==
The college contains many research centers and institutes, including the Biostatistics Center. Its main facilities are located at George Washington University's Foggy Bottom campus.

== Organization and administration ==
The college is managed by a team of administrative staff led a dean. The leadership is also supported by the National Council for Arts and Sciences, which is composed of national and international alumni and others associated to the college and serves a volunteer advisory board. Other affiliated advisory councils are the Corcoran Strategic Advisory Council, the National Council for Media and Public Affairs, and the Trachtenberg School Advisory Board.

== Academics ==
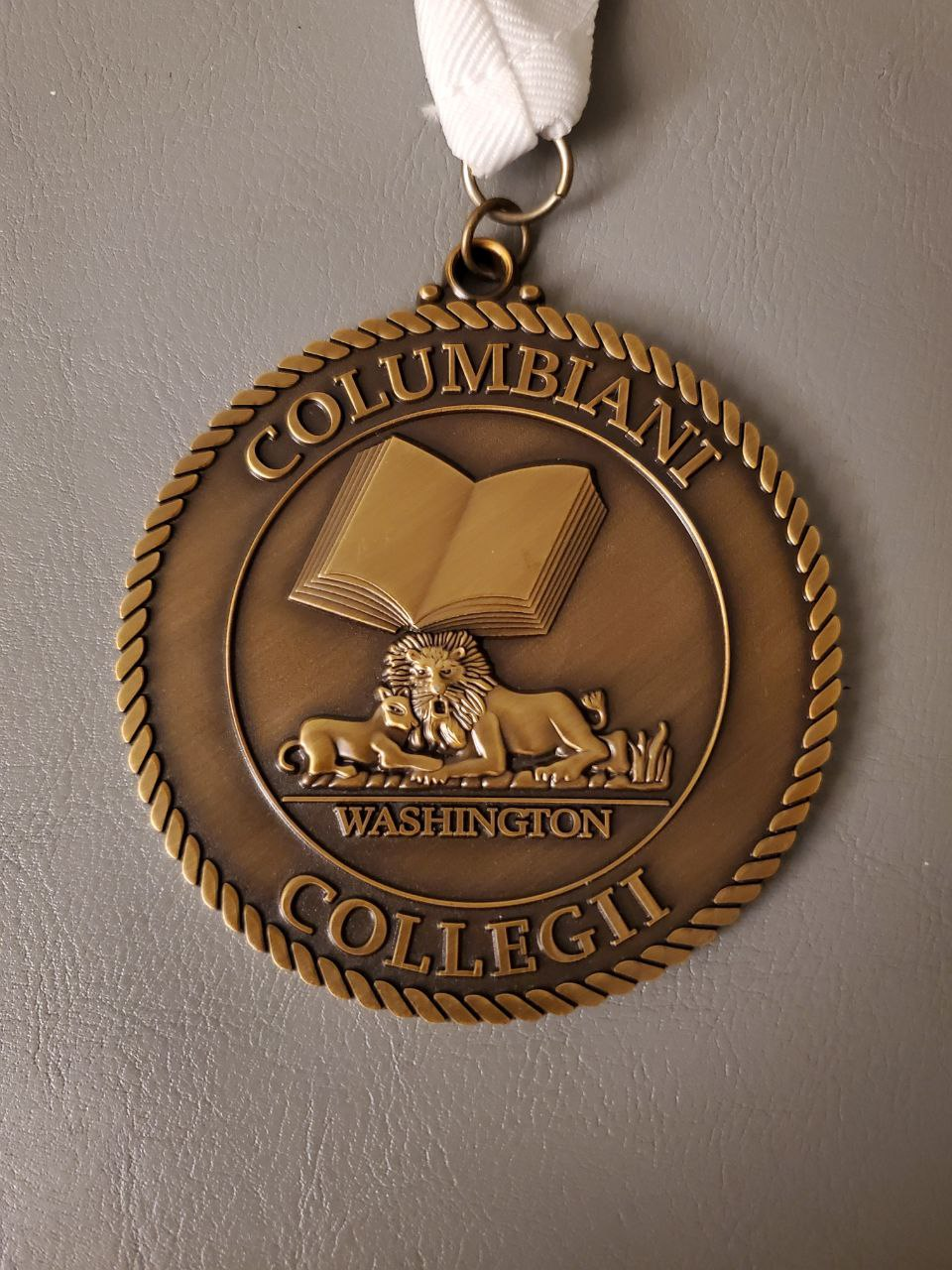
A commencement medal worn by graduates of the Columbian College of Arts and Sciences at George Washington University

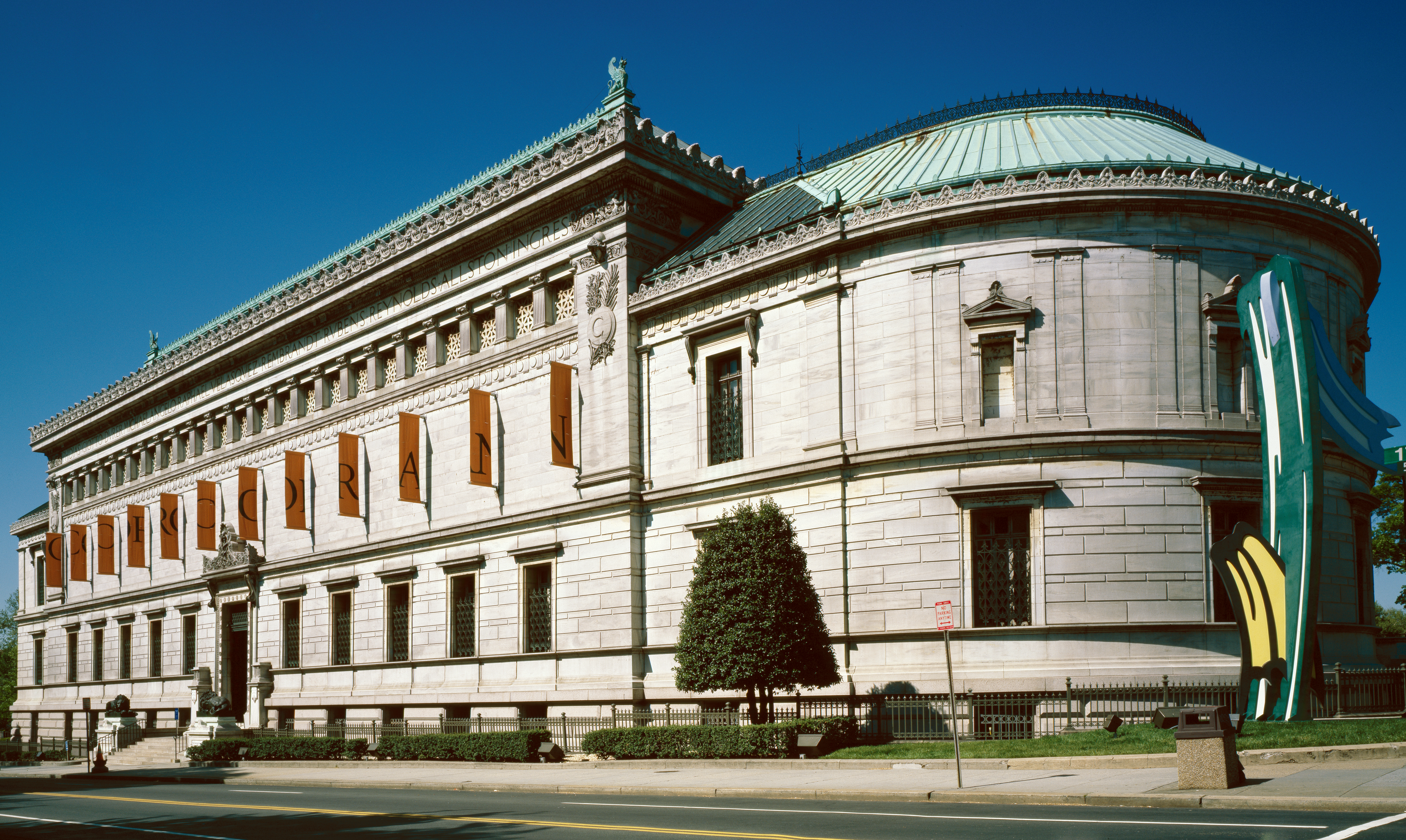
The Corcoran School of the Arts and Design, located across The Ellipse from the White House

The Columbian College houses 42 academic departments and programs. CCAS is also host to three distinct schools:

- School of Media and Public Affairs (SMPA)
- Corcoran School of the Arts and Design
- Trachtenberg School of Public Policy and Public Administration (SPPPA)

It offers a total of 61 undergraduate minors, 58 undergraduate major, 51 master's degrees and 33 combined degree program's (bachelor's and master's). The college offers degrees in the main fields Arts & Design, Clinical Programs, Humanities, Mathematics & Statistical Analysis, Natural & Forensic Sciences, Policy & Public Affairs and Social & Behavioral Sciences.

The college also offers different engaged learning programs, an extensive on- and offline summer school program, 16 graduate certificates and more than 30 doctoral degrees.

The college has an international network of partnering universities and schools. For students there are currently more than 300 study and exchange programs in 50 countries available.

Graduates of the college are awarded a commencement medal depicting the college's seal that is worn during the commencement ceremony. The original seal was designed by James Peale when the Columbian College was founded in 1821. The seal originally depicted a biblical lion laying down with a lamb under an open book with Greek text that translated to "In the beginning was the Word, and the Word was with God." The design of the seal was changed in 1873 and completely replaced by George Washington University in 1905. The college still uses the seal but with the Greek text omitted.

== Rankings ==
Columbian College rankings

World rankings
ARWU – Political science	17th
QS – Political science	22nd

U.S. rankings
Intelligent – Crime Scene Investigation	6th
U.S. News & World – History	59th
U.S. News & World – Economics	63rd

In the 2018 Academic Ranking of World Universities, Columbian ranks in the top 76–100 schools of social sciences in the world.

In 2019, Intelligent ranked the college's Department of Forensic Science as 6th in The Best Master's in Crime Scene Investigation Degree Programs from an assessment of 443 education programs compared from 159 colleges and universities.

== Research ==
The college is home to 28 research centers and institutes with an average annual research expenditure of $18.6 million. Research is supported by internal funding and external grants from institutions like the National Science Foundation and the National Institutes of Health.

It also offers different undergraduate, graduate and postdoctoral student research fellowships and programs.

== Notable people ==
Notable Alumni of the Columbian College

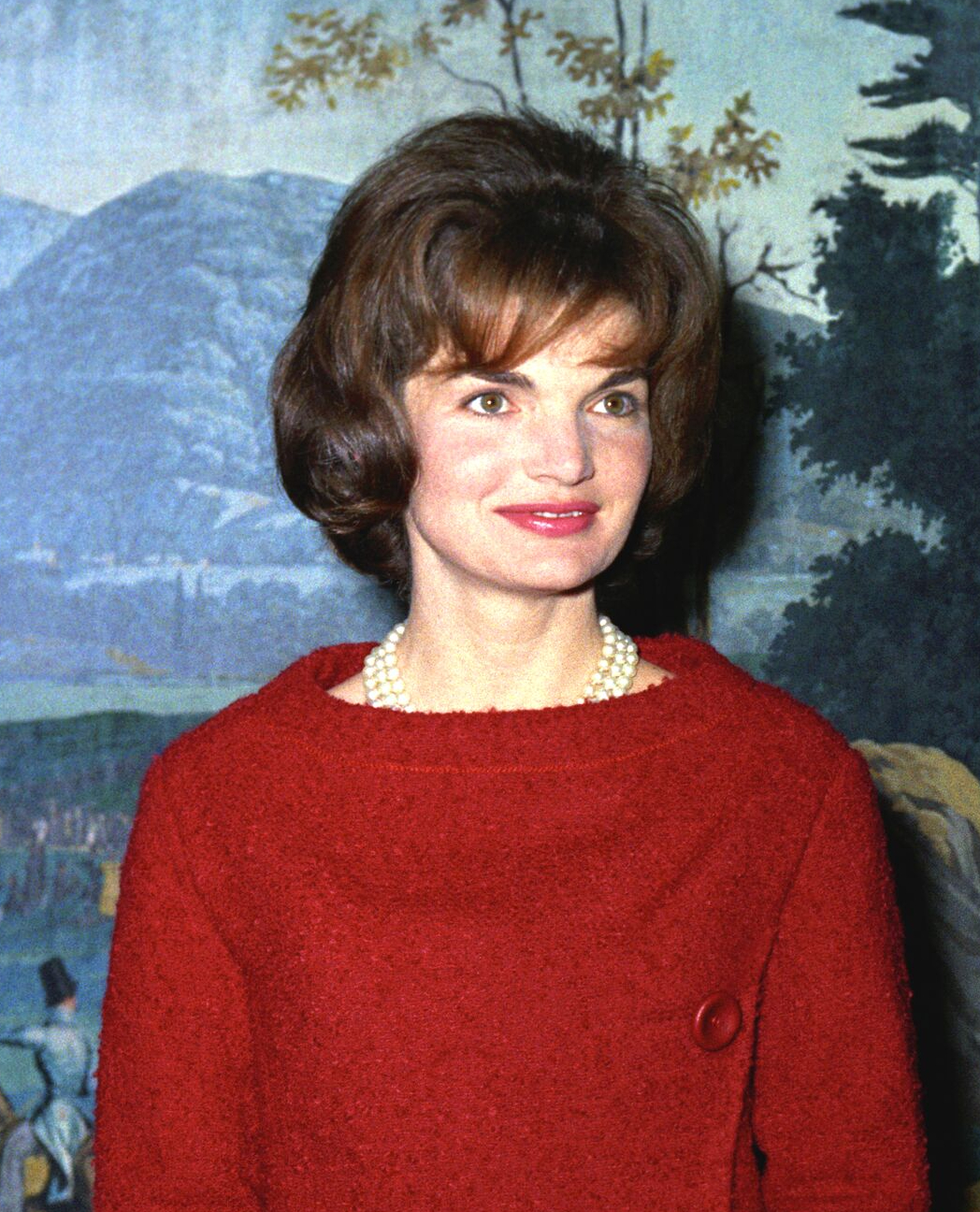
Jacqueline Kennedy Onassis ('51) – First Lady of the United States

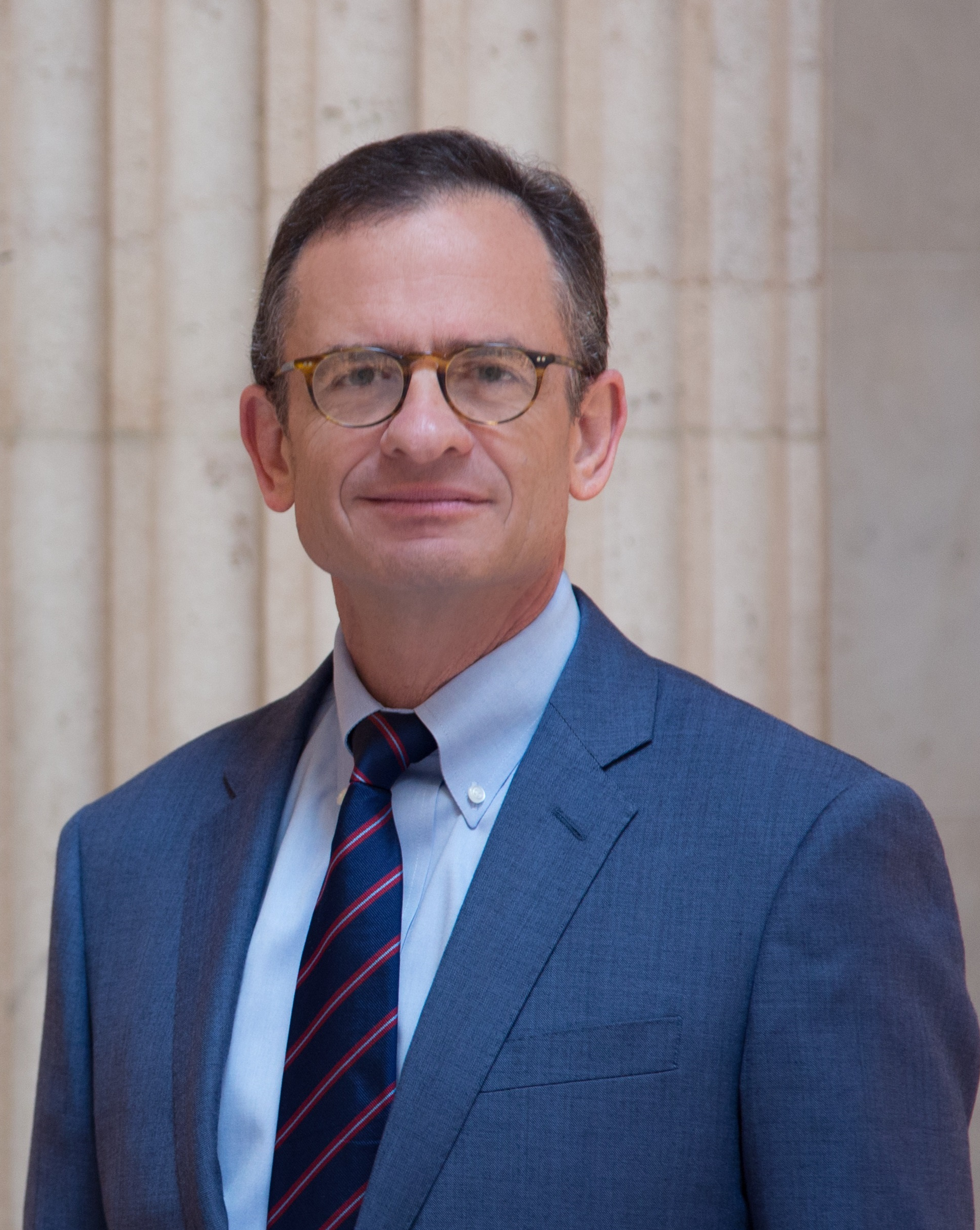
Daniel H. Weiss ('79) – President & CEO the Metropolitan Museum of Art

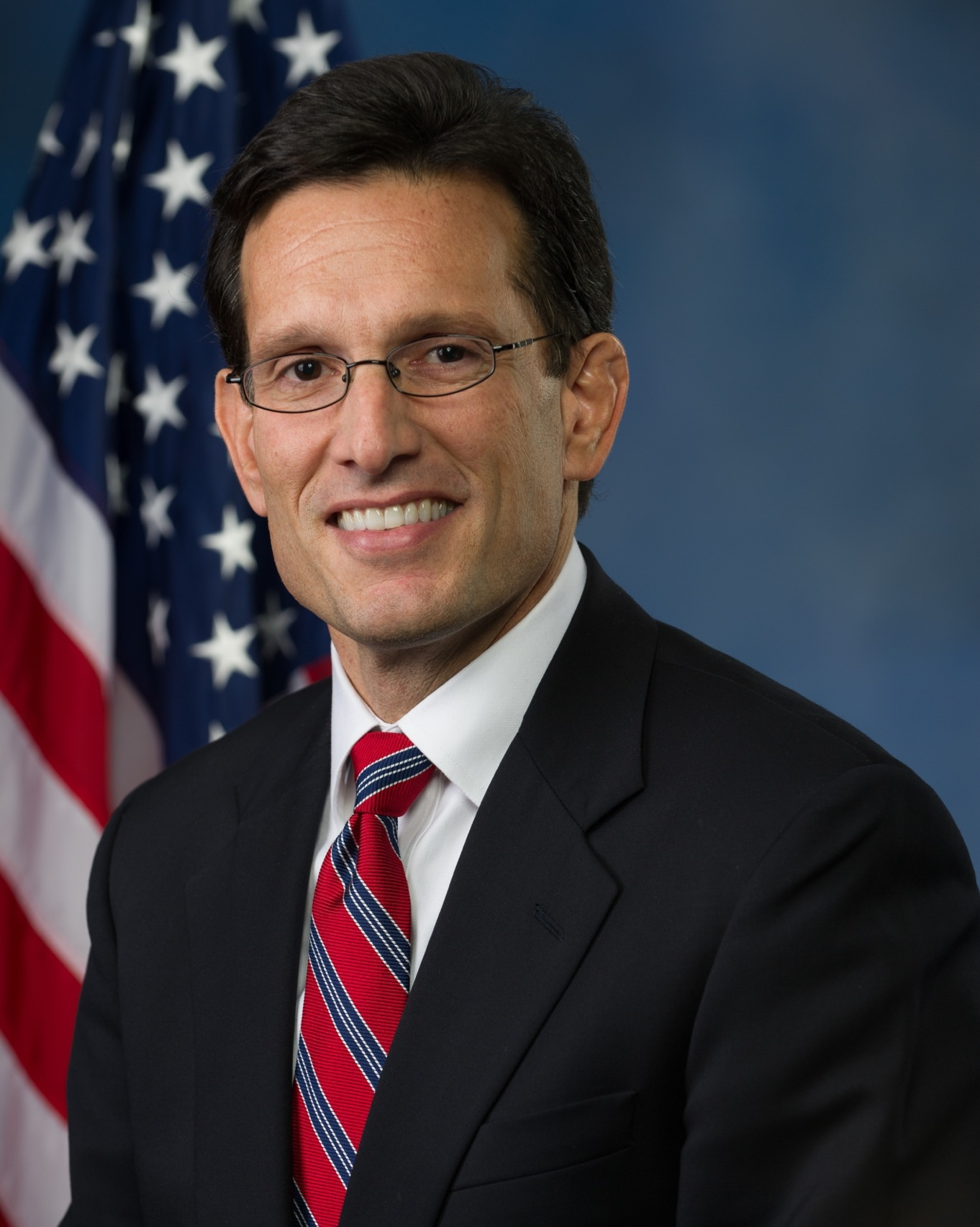
Eric Cantor ('85) – Former House Majority Leader

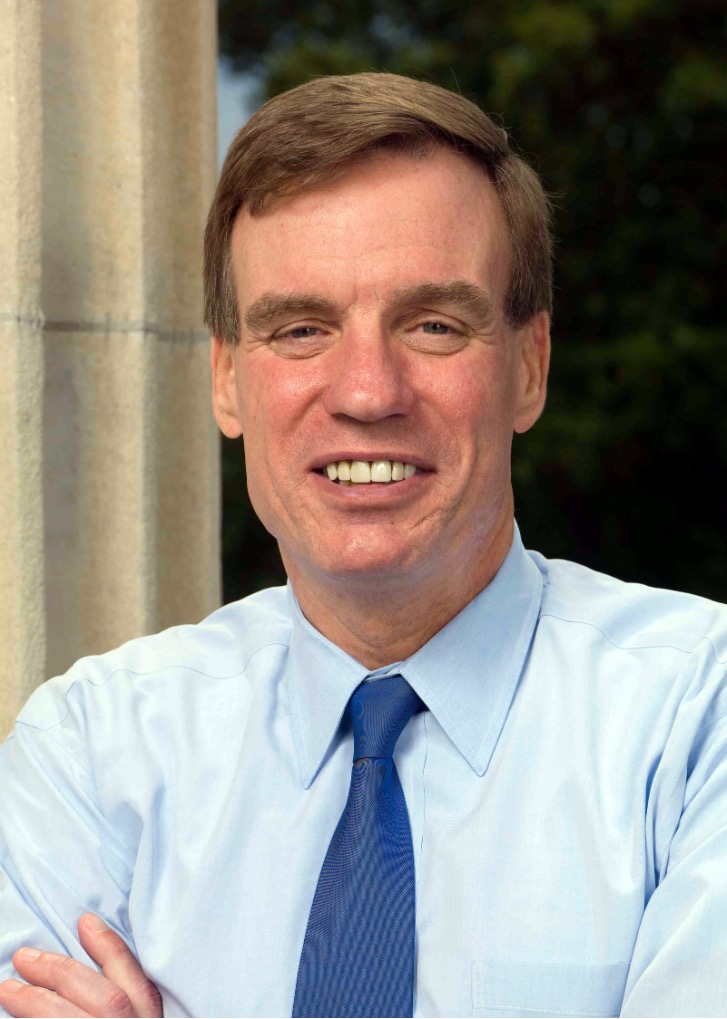
Mark Warner ('77) – Current U.S. Senator and former Governor of Virginia

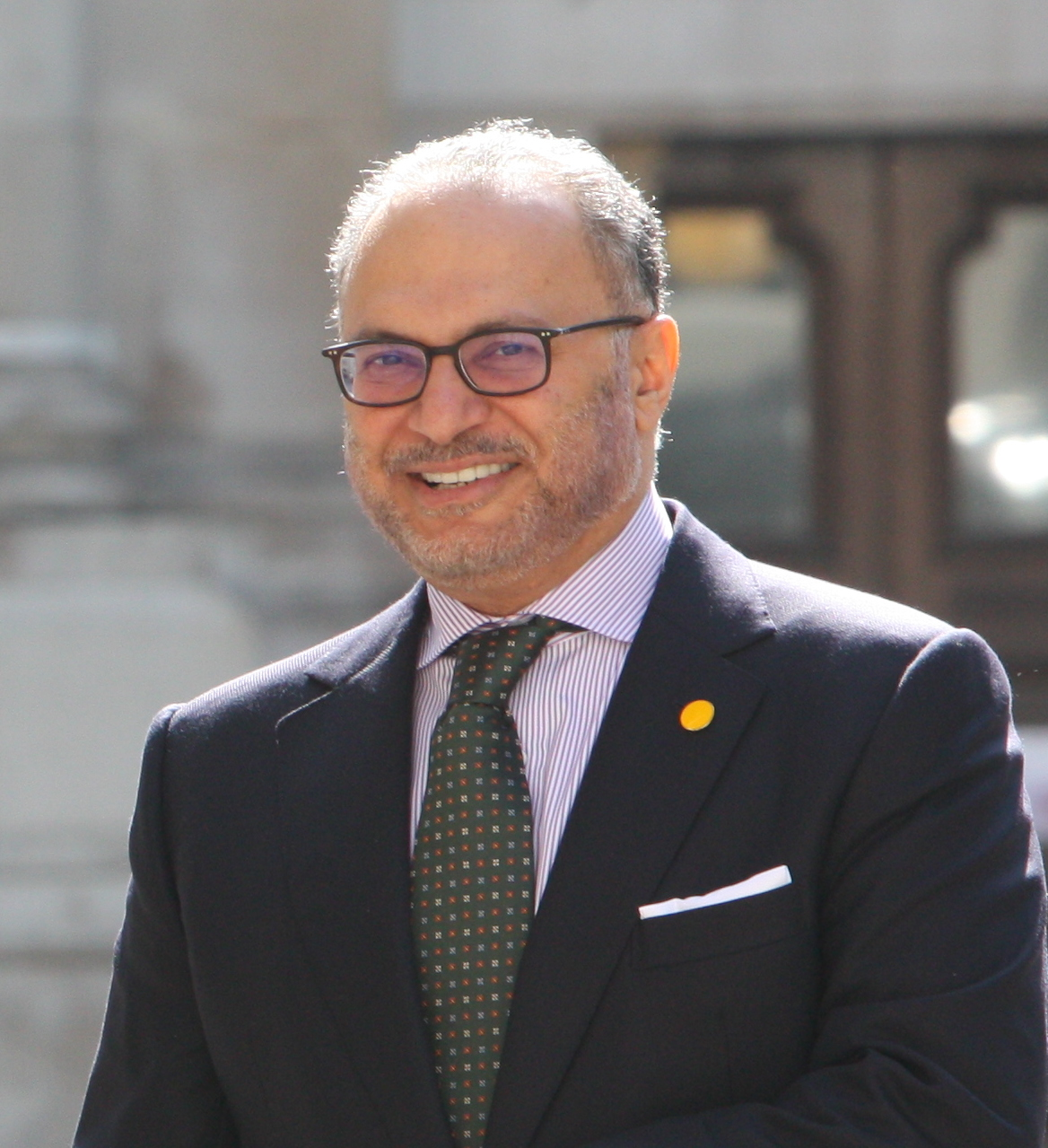
Anwar Gargash ('81, '84) – Minister of State for Foreign Affairs of the United Arab Emirates

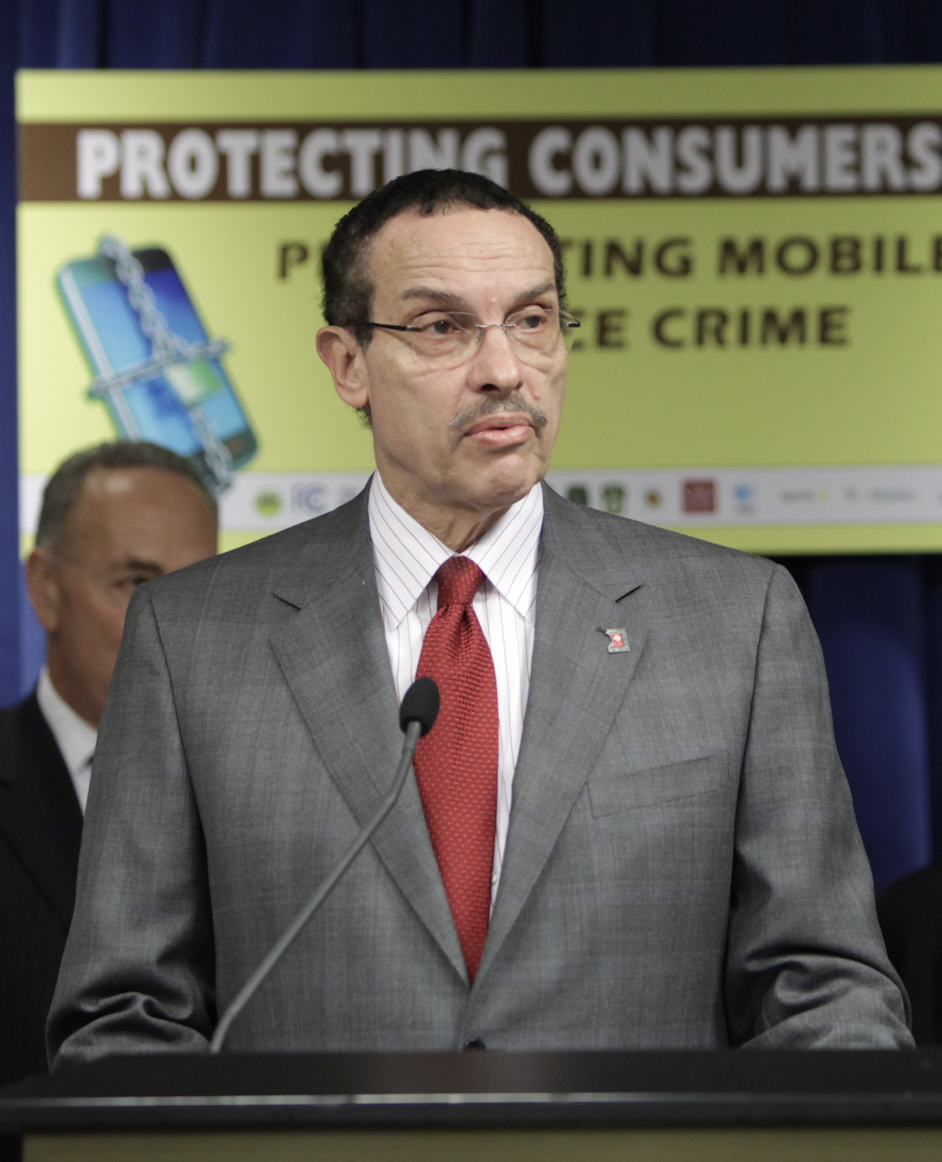
Vincent C. Gray ('64) – Former Mayor of the District of Columbia

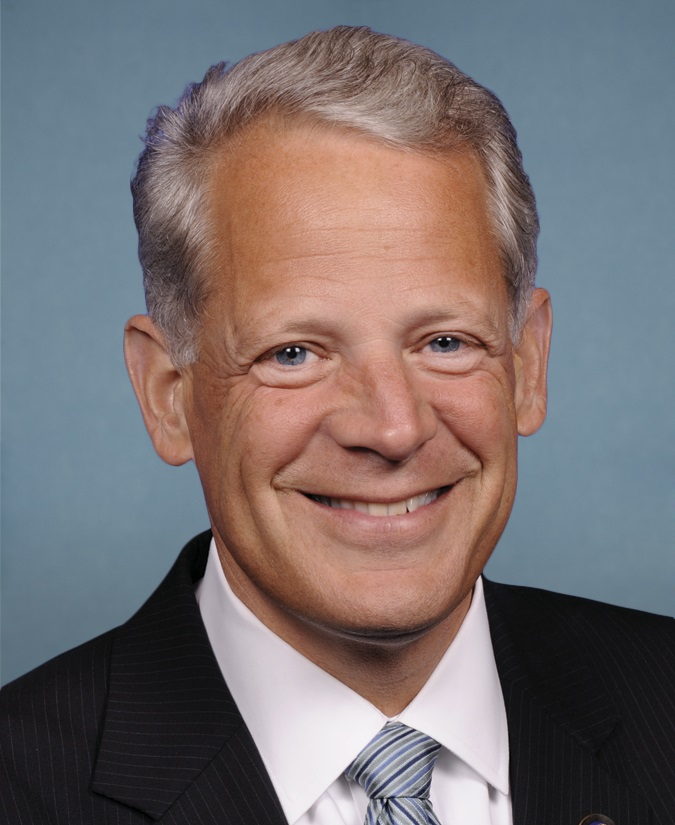
Steve Israel ('81) – Former Chair of the Democratic Congressional Campaign Committee

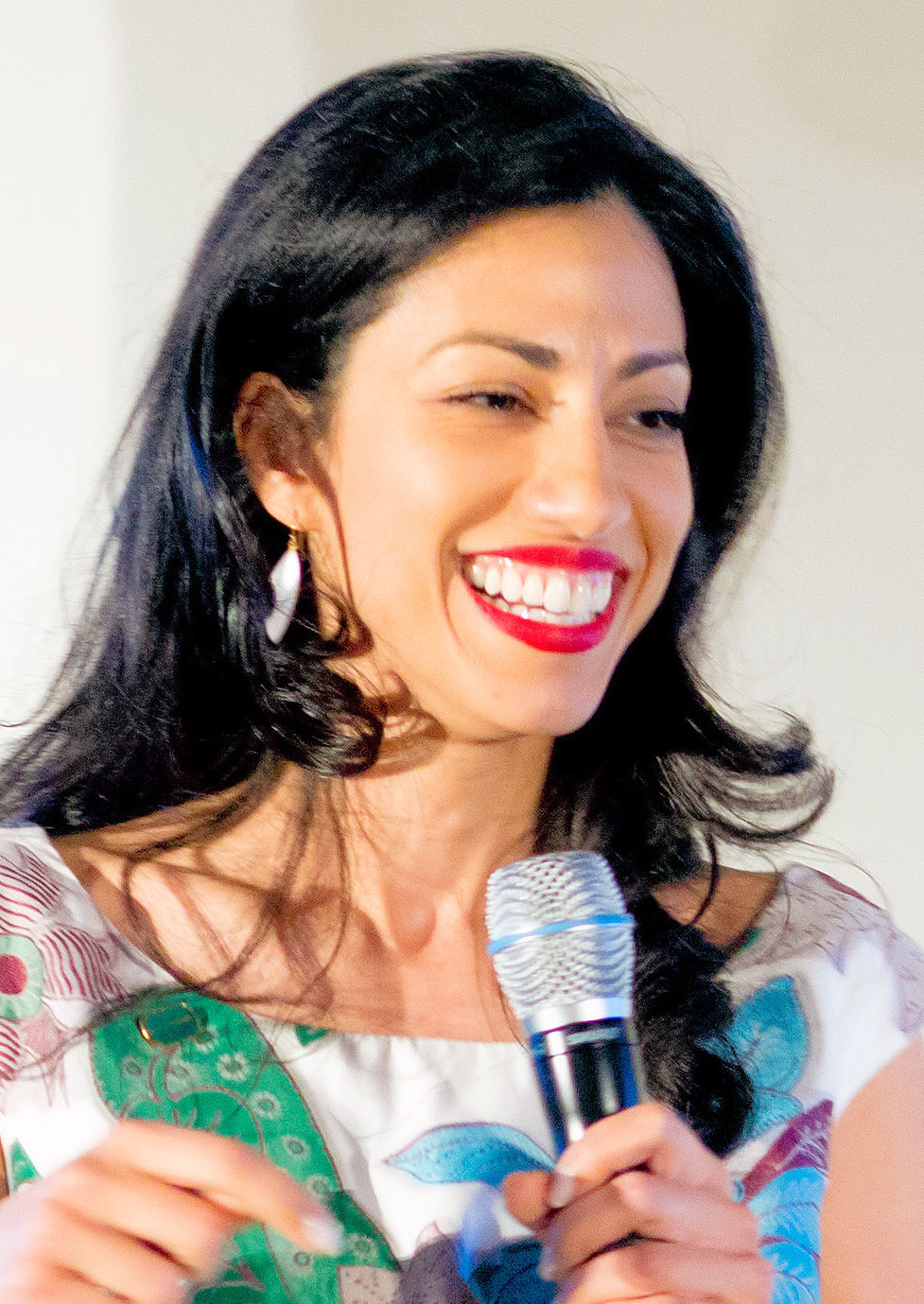
Huma Abedin ('97) – Former chief of staff to Hillary Clinton

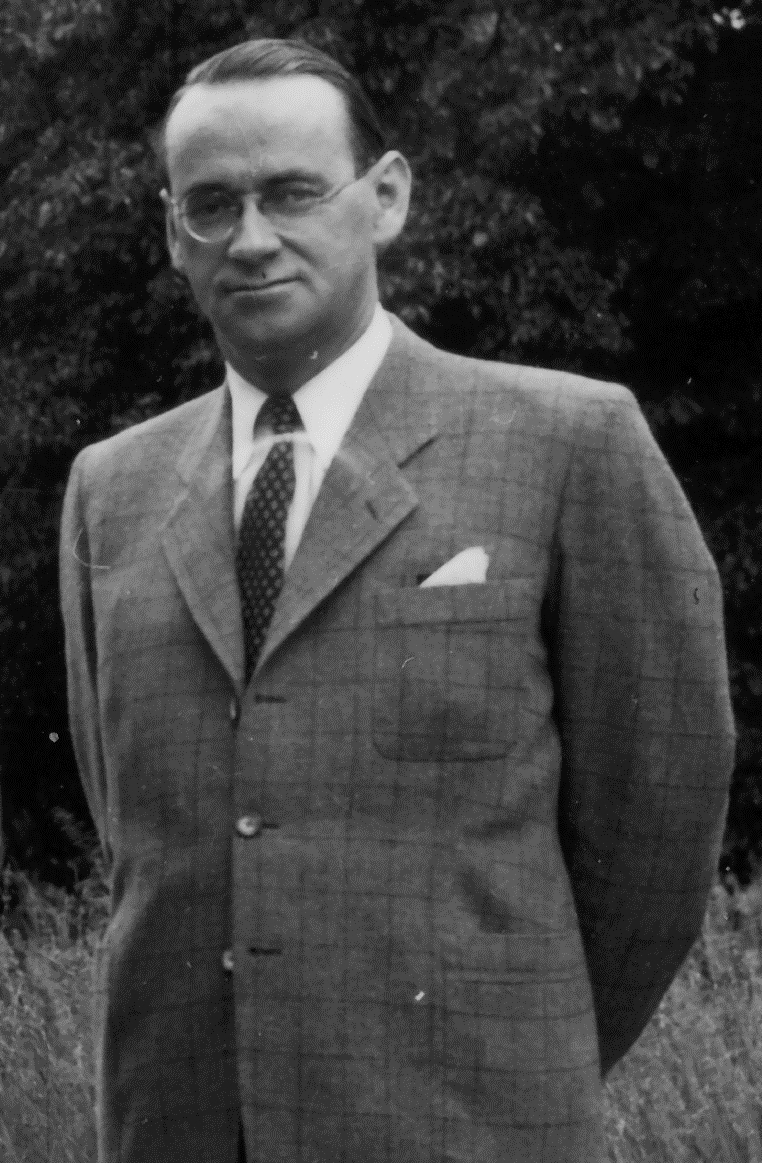
Carl Lutz ('24) – Swiss diplomat who saved over 62,000 Jews during World War II

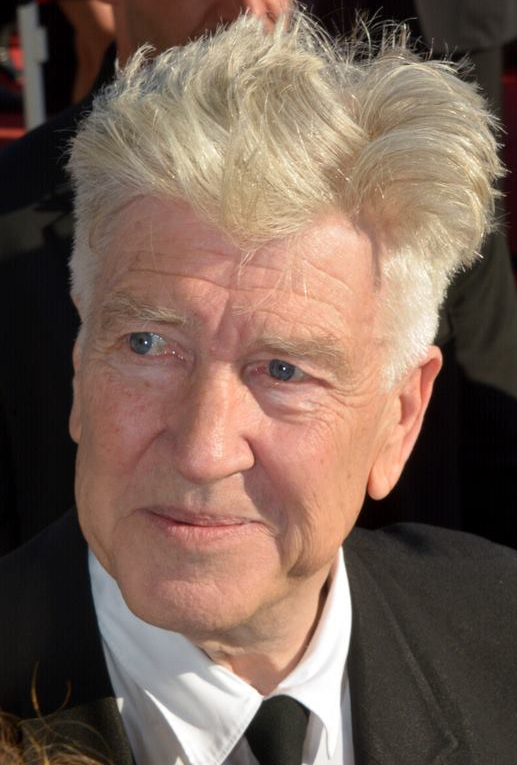
David Lynch – Artist and director

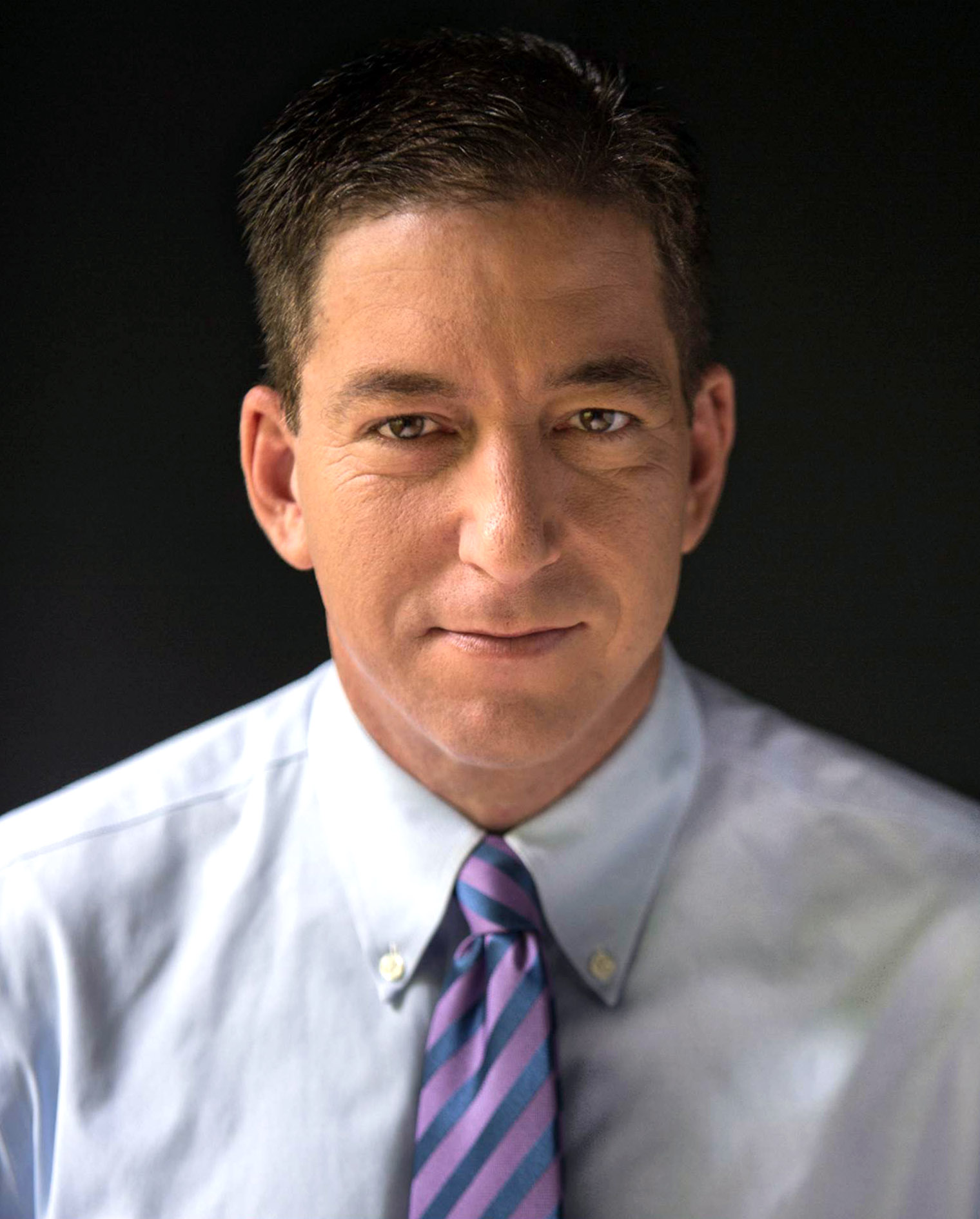
Glenn Greenwald – Journalist

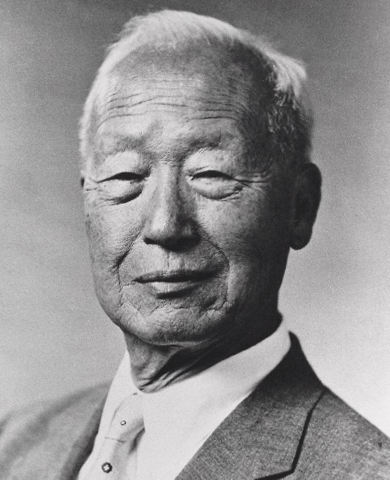
Syngman Rhee – 1st President of South Korea

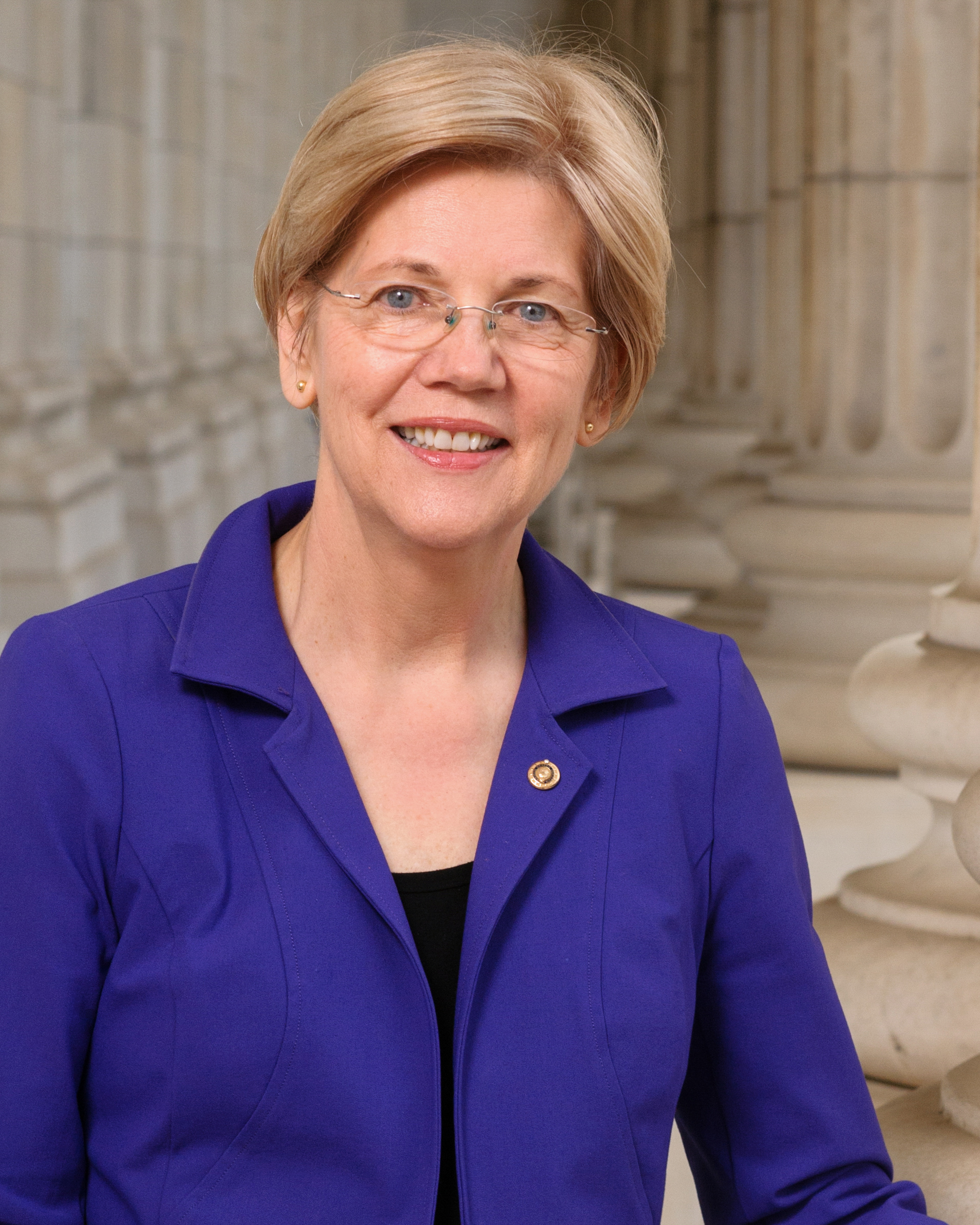
Elizabeth Warren, Senator from Massachusetts

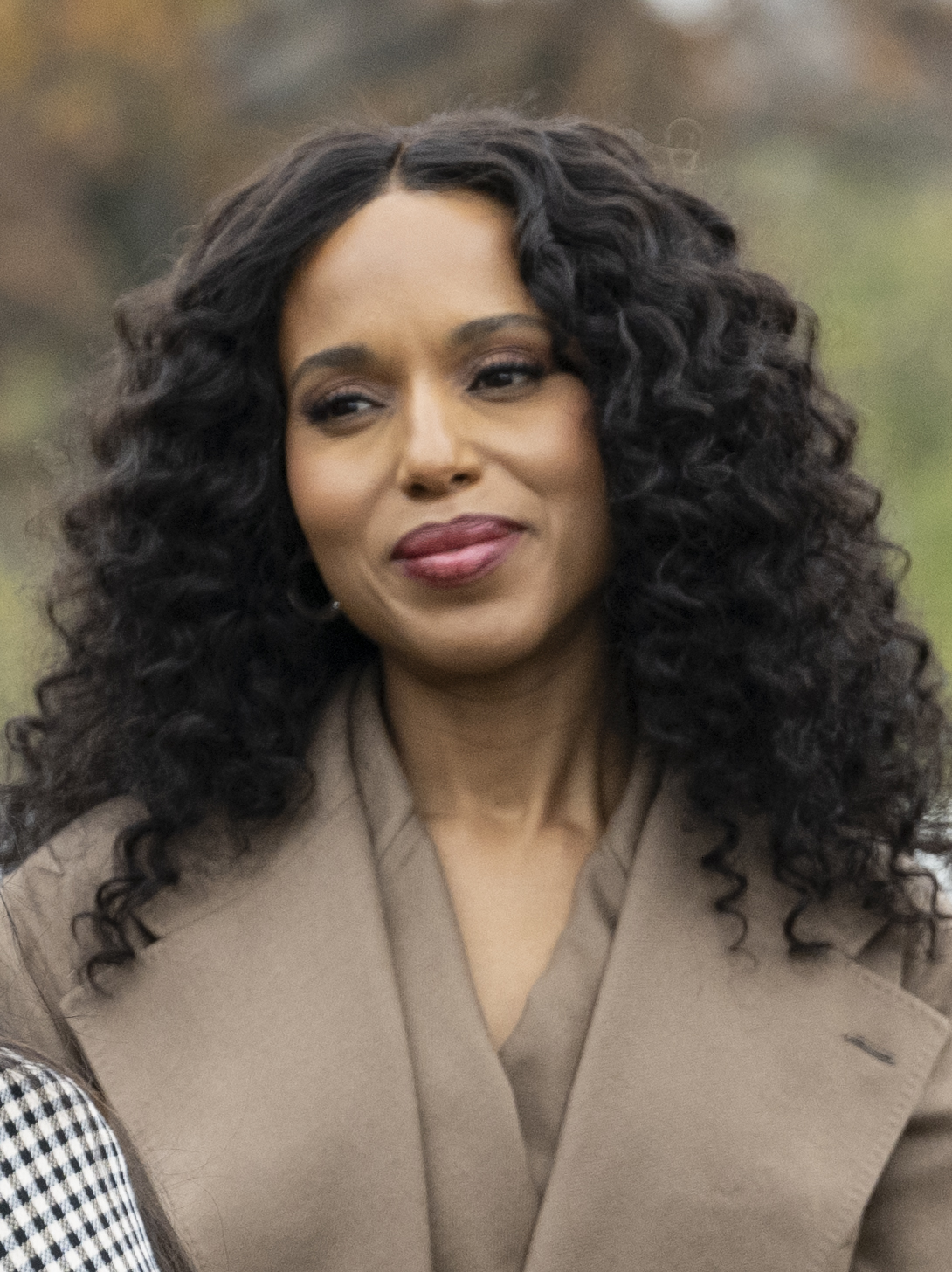
Kerry Washington ('98) – Time 100 and Emmy Award-winning actress
